= Alpujarra Granadina =

- Comarca
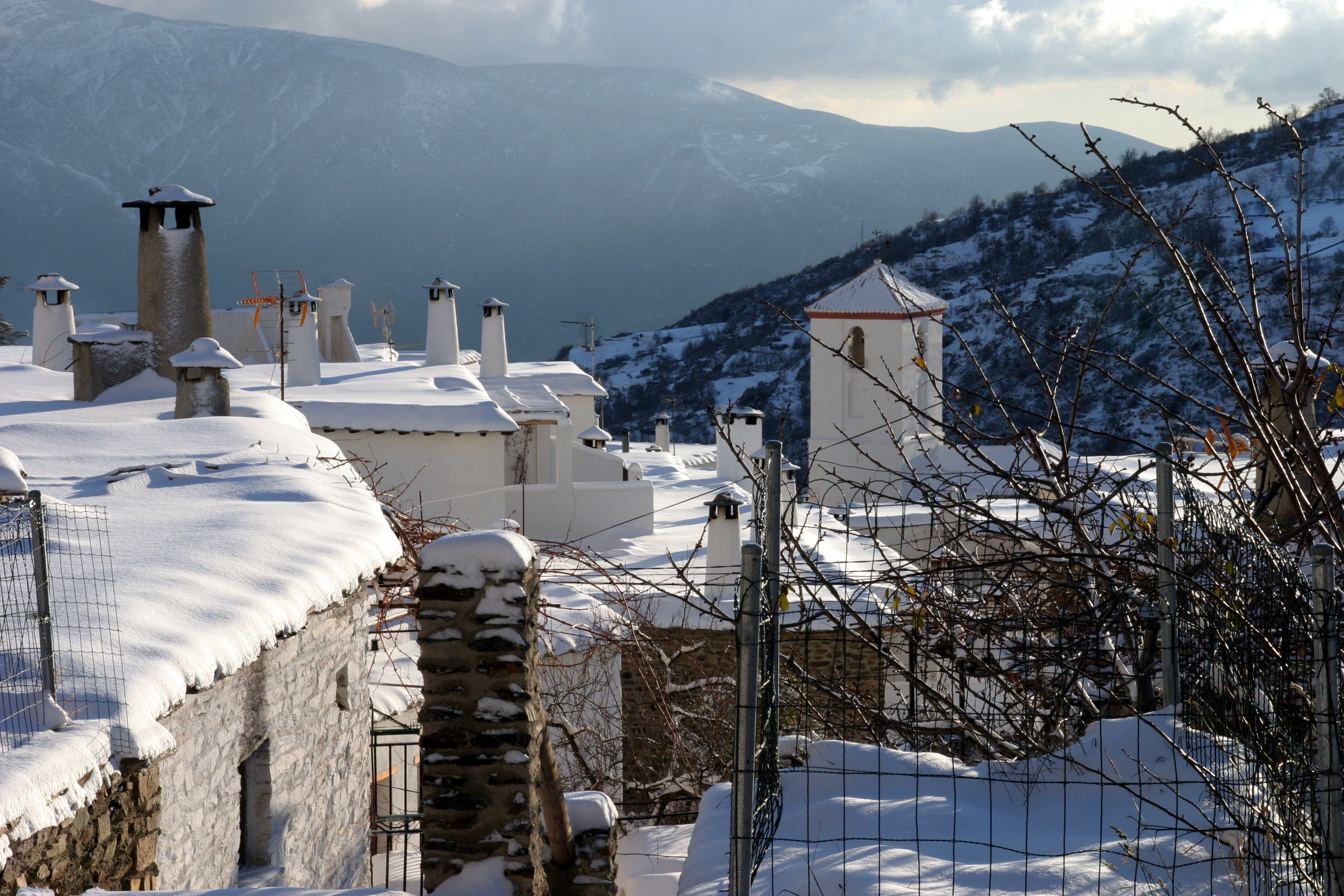
- Winter landscape in Capileira.

- Flag

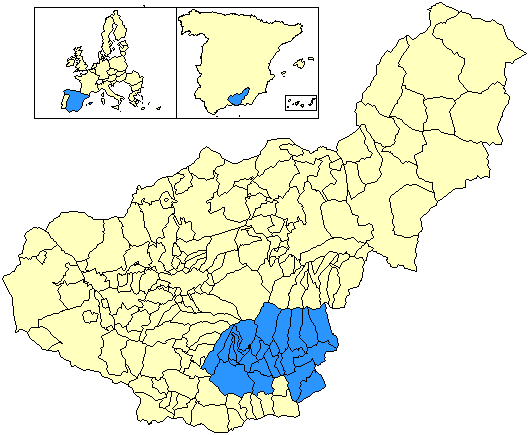
- Alpujarra Granadina within Granada
- Coordinates: 36°54′1″N 3°25′26″W
- Country: Spain
- Autonomous community: Andalusia
- Province: Granada
- Seat: Órgiva
- Subdivision: 25 municipalities

Area
  - Total: 1,140.92 km^{2} (440.51 sq mi)

Population (2023) (Note: Estimate at 1 January 2023: National Statistics Institute (Spain))
  - Total: 23,339
  - Density: 20.456/km^{2} (52.982/sq mi)
- Demonym: Alpujarreños
- Time zone: UTC+1 (CET)
  - Summer (DST): UTC+2 (CEST)
- Largest municipality: Órgiva

Alpujarra Granadina is a Spanish comarca in the Province of Granada. Along with Alpujarra Almeriense, it forms the historical region of the Alpujarras. This comarca was established in 2003 by the Government of Andalusia.

== Overview ==
Located in the west of the Alpujarras, it borders the Granadan comarcas of Accitania (Guadix) to the north, the Vega de Granada to the northwest, the Valle de Lecrín to the west, and the Costa Tropical to the south, as well as the Almerían comarcas of Poniente Almeriense to the southeast and the Alpujarra Almeriense to the east.

== Subdivision ==
The comarca is divided into 25 municipalities (municipios).

Arms	Municipality	Area (km^{2})	Population (2023) (Note: Estimate at 1 January 2023: National Statistics Institute (Spain))	Density (/km^{2})
	Almegíjar	30.00	335	11.17
	Alpujarra de la Sierra	69.00	940	13.62
	Bérchules	69.00	690	10.00
	Bubión	14.85	309	20.81
	Busquístar	18.02	319	17.70
	Cádiar	47.32	1,539	32.52
	Cáñar	26.33	397	15.08
	Capileira	56.85	582	10.24
	Carataunas	4.66	234	50.21
	Cástaras	28.36	224	7.90
	Juviles	15.00	146	9.73
	Lanjarón	60.38	3,664	60.68
	Lobras	16.05	149	9.28
	Murtas	71.70	458	6.39
	Nevada	77.31	1,105	14.29
	Órgiva	134.14	5,709	42.56
	Pampaneira	17.47	310	17.74
	Pórtugos	21.00	388	18.48
	Soportújar	14.15	283	20.00
	La Taha	25.59	769	30.05
	Torvizcón	51.36	618	12.03
	Trevélez	90.89	702	7.72
	Turón	55.53	219	3.94
	Ugíjar	66.96	2,574	38.44
	Válor	59.00	676	11.46
	Total	1,140.92	23,339	20.46

== See also ==
- Alpujarra Almeriense
- Morisco Revolt
- Sierra Nevada
