= Trevélez =

- Municipality
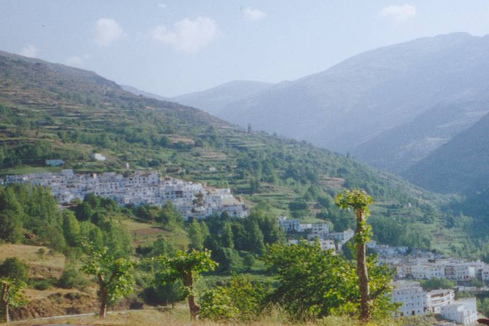
- The approach to Trevélez from the west

- Flag Coat of arms

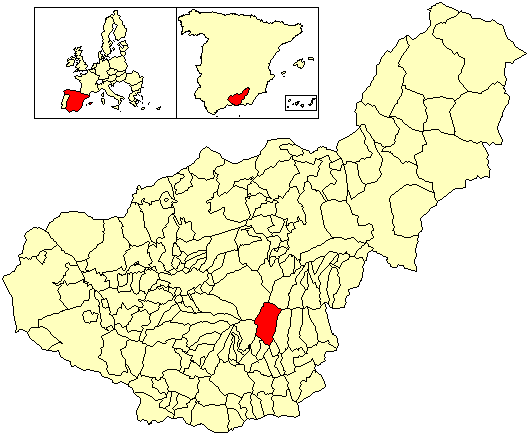
- Location of Trevélez

- Location in Spain
- Coordinates: 37°0′N 3°16′W
- Country: Spain
- Autonomous community: Andalusia
- Province: Granada
- Comarca: Alpujarras
- Judicial district: Órgiva

Government
  - Alcalde: Antonio González Álvarez (2007) (PSOE)

Area
  - Total: 91 km^{2} (35 sq mi)
- Elevation: 1,476 m (4,843 ft)

Population (2025-01-01)
  - Total: 698
  - Density: 7.7/km^{2} (20/sq mi)
- Demonym(s): Treveleño, -ña
- Time zone: UTC+1 (CET)
  - Summer (DST): UTC+2 (CEST)
- Postal code: 18417
- Official language(s): Spanish

Trevélez (pronounced [tɾeˈβeleθ]) is a village in the province of Granada, Spain. Its population in 2011 was estimated at 823. The river Trevélez flows through the village. It is located in the western part of the Alpujarras region.

Two of the highest mountains in Spain, Mulhacén and Alcazaba, are just to the north of the village, a few hours' walk away. Located at a height of 1486 metres, Trevélez is sometimes claimed to be the highest village in Spain. However, it is not the highest municipality of Spain: that honour goes to Valdelinares, which is located in the Sierra de Gúdar range of the Sistema Ibérico, in the province of Teruel, Aragon.

== River ==
The river Trevélez flows through the village, which lies at the confluence of the river with a smaller stream. It is divided into three parts, the Barrios Bajo, Medio and Alto (lower, mid and upper quarters), with 200 metres of altitude difference between the highest and lowest points. The only bridge over the river is in the Barrio Bajo.

== Economy ==
The Barrio Bajo is a significant tourist centre, while the Barrios Medio and Alto are more typically Alpujarran in style, though tourism is important to the economy of the entire village. Some tourists come to see the air-cured hams, a speciality throughout the Alpujarras but particularly associated with the village, because the dry climate due to its altitude makes for ideal conditions for storing them.

To the west, the nearest village is Busquístar; the road through the Bajo Barrio continues to the east and south to Juviles and Torvizcón. There is a regular bus service along this road, linking the village to the regional centres of Lanjarón and Órgiva as well as the provincial capital, Granada.

Trevélez celebrates the day of the Virgen de Las Nieves (Virgin of the Snows) in the summer months. On this day the virgin is carried to the summit of Mulhacén and a mass is celebrated. The traditional belief is that this will keep travellers safe in the Sierra Nevada for another year.

== Photo gallery ==
Mirador de Trevélez: view from the West

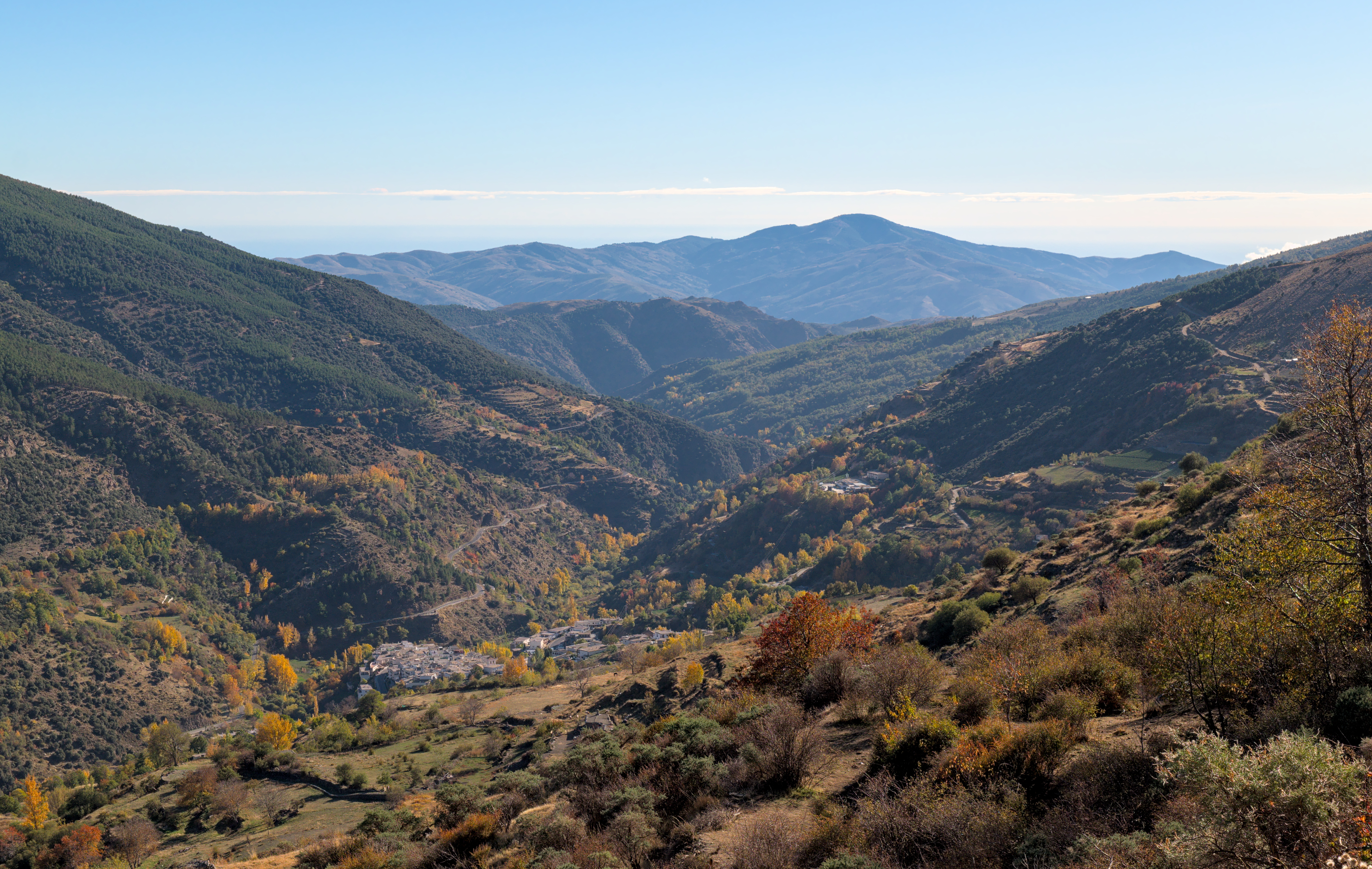
View from the North

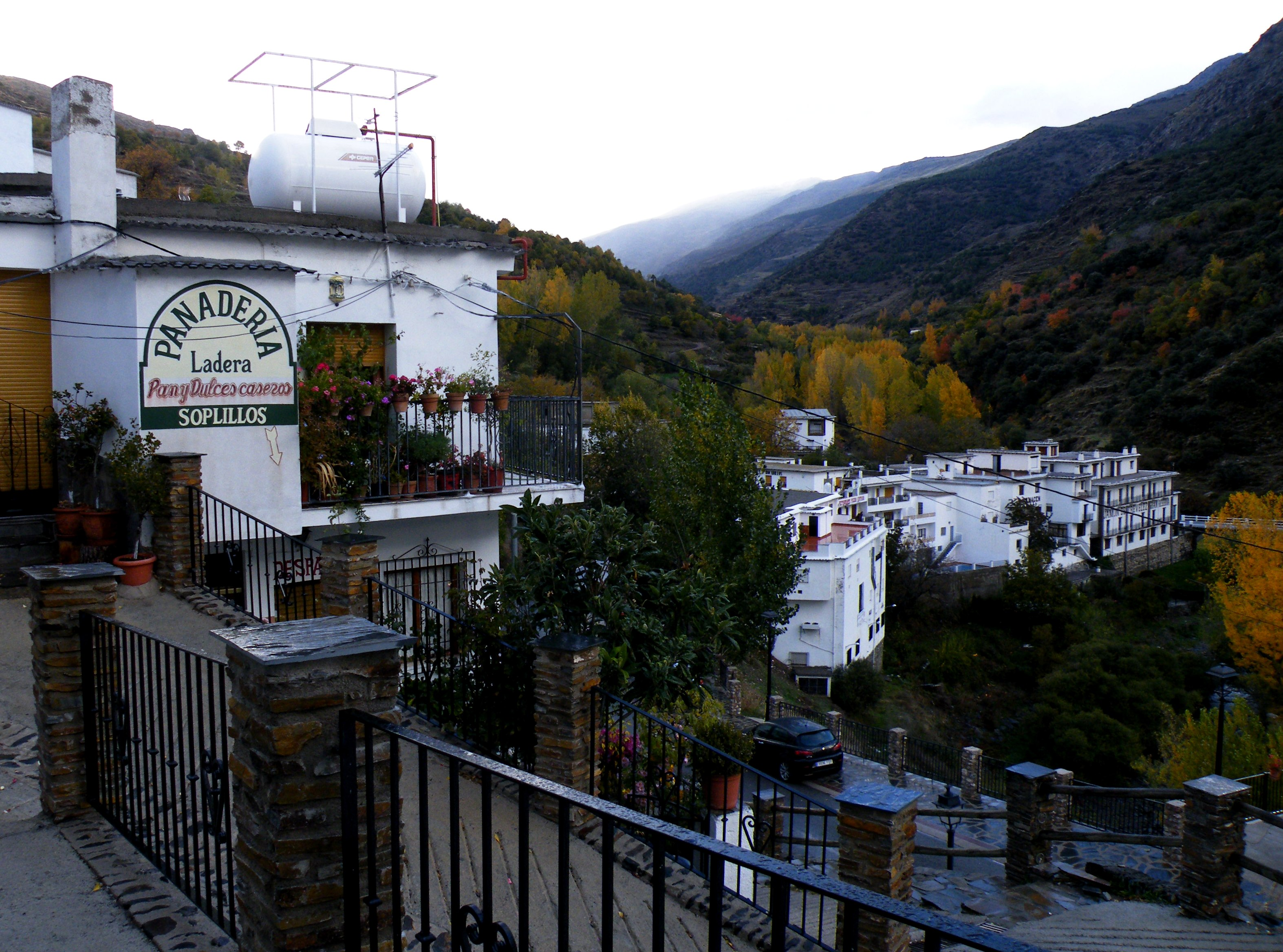
Terrace housing

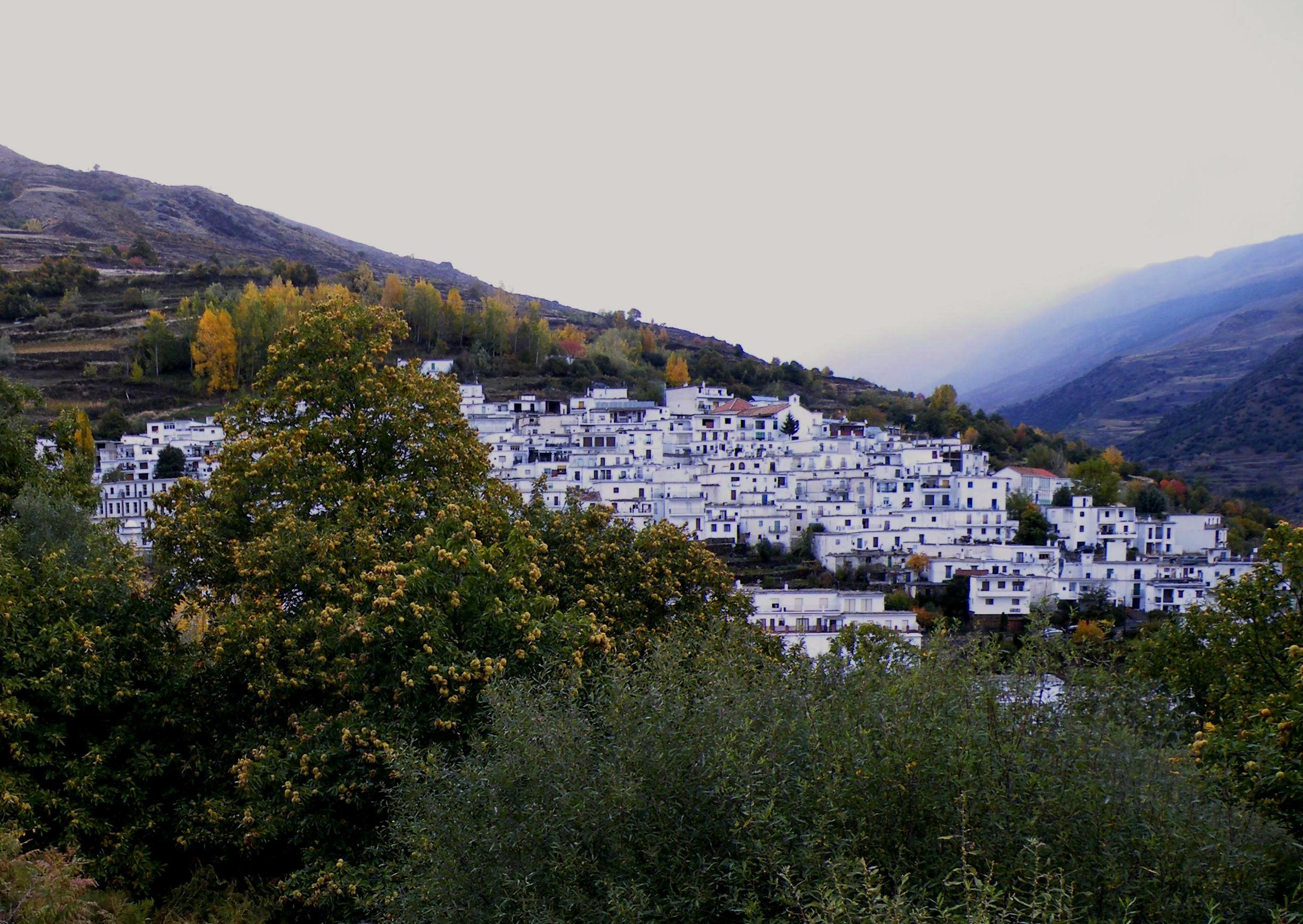
Trevelez as seen from the west side

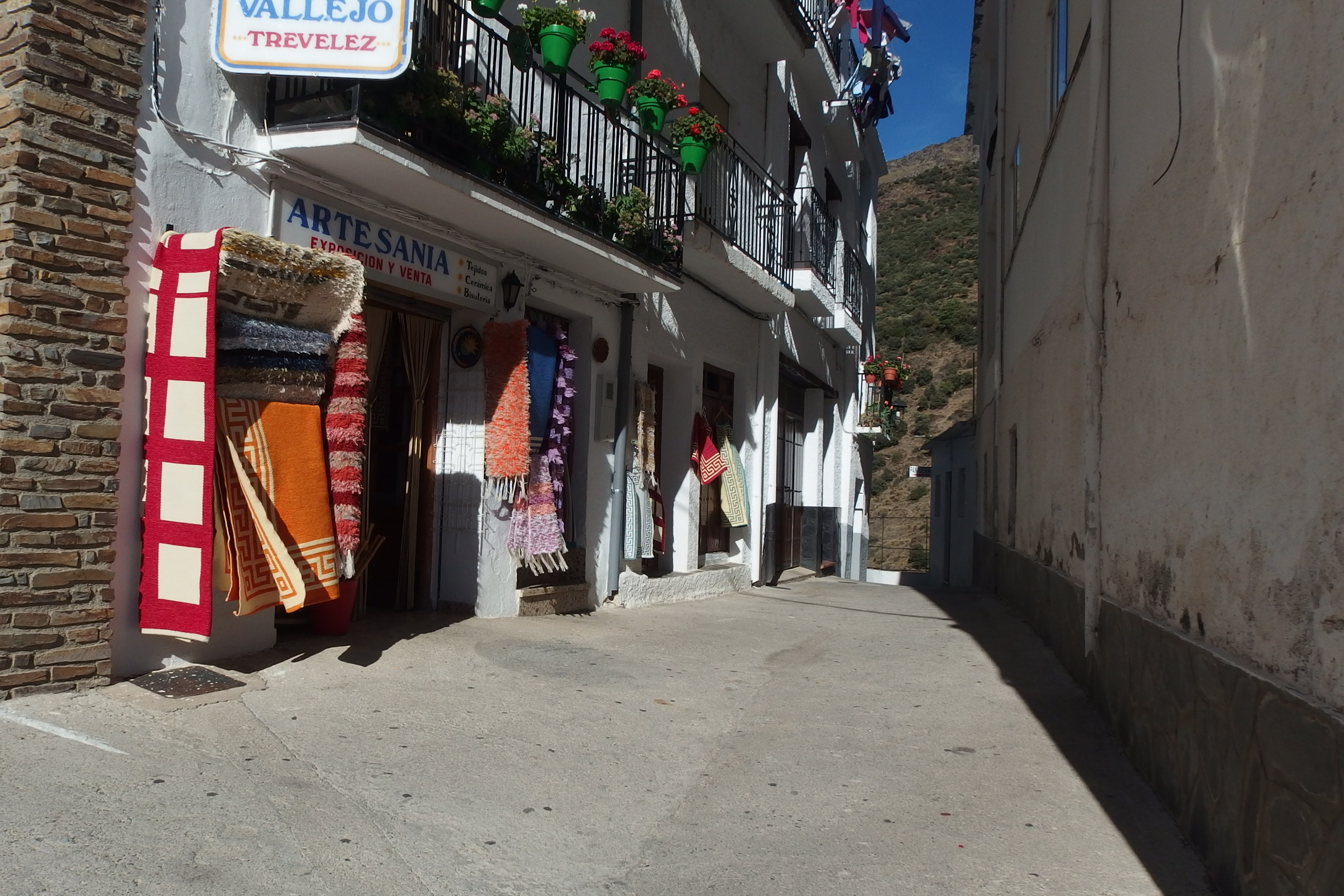
Shops in Trevelez

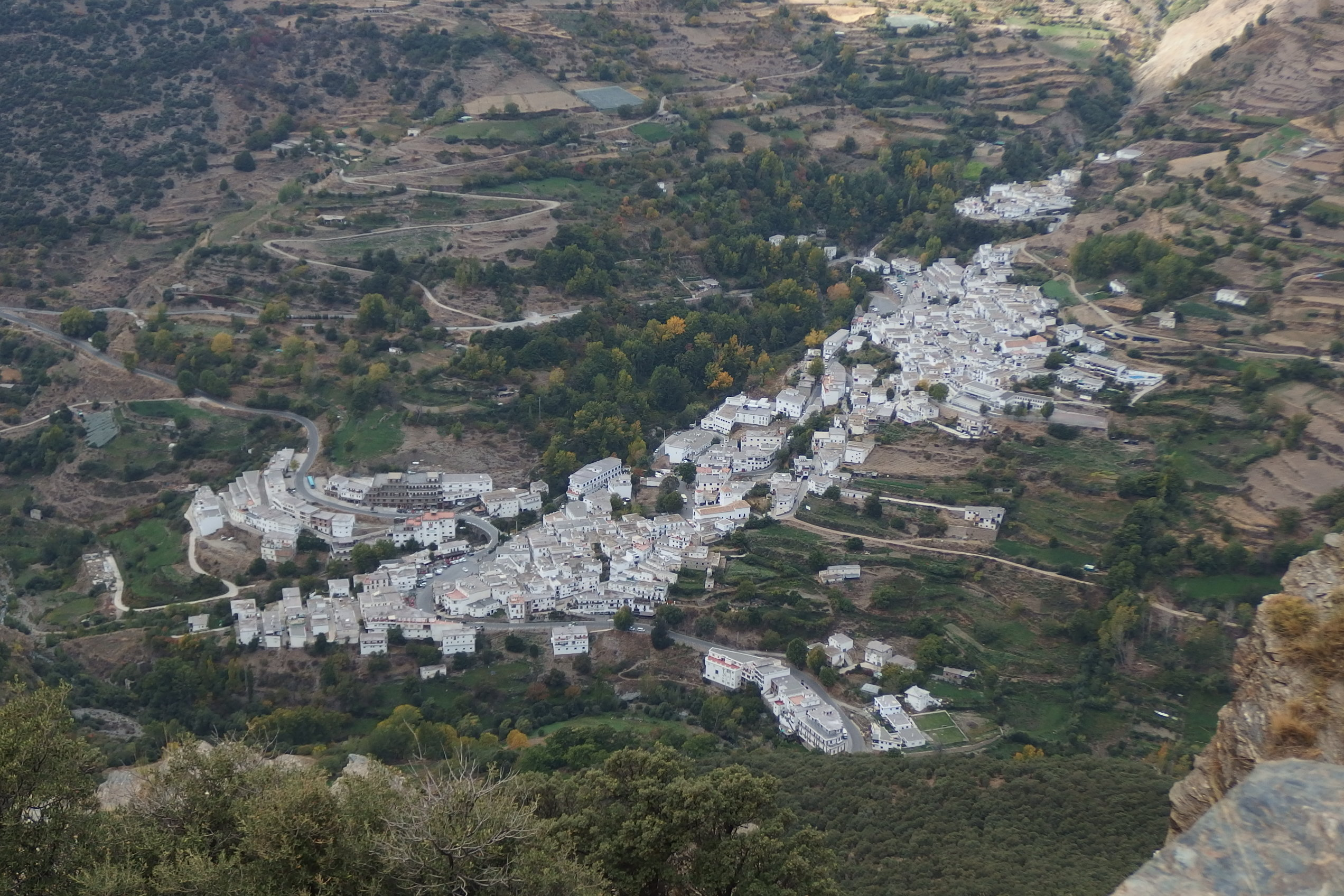
Trevelez from Peñabon mountain

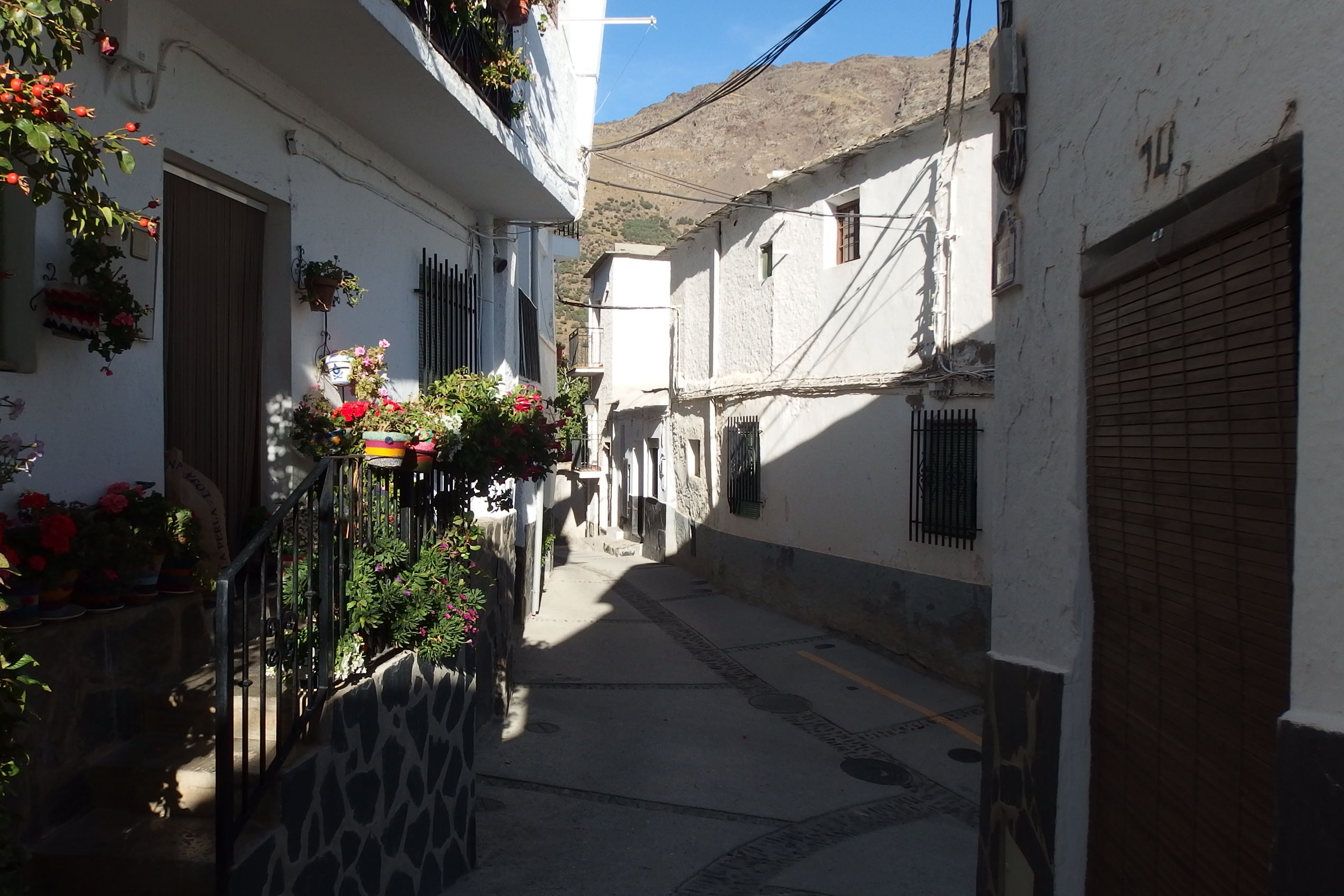
One of streets in Trevelez

== See also ==
- List of municipalities in Granada
