= Trevélez (river) =

River in the province of Granada, Spain

Coordinates: 36°54′04″N 3°22′04″W

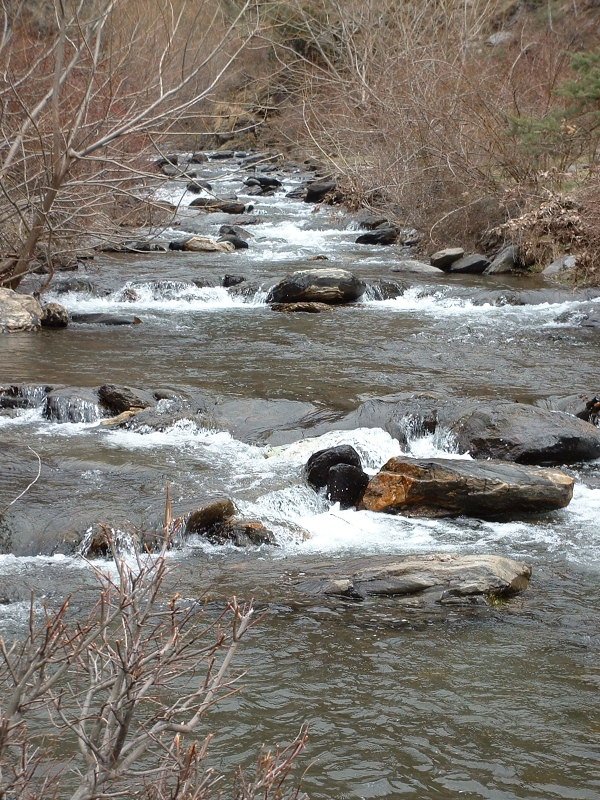
Río Trevélez upstream of the town, early spring

The Trevélez River is a river in the province of Granada, Spain. It flows through the town of Trevélez in the western part of the Alpujarras region. The Trevélez river rises in the Sierra Nevada to the north of the town, and flows south and west from Trevélez, through a narrow gorge to the south of Busquístar and the La Tahá villages, eventually converging with the Rio Poqueira shortly before flowing into the Río Guadalfeo.

== See also ==
- List of rivers of Spain
