= La Taha =

- Municipality
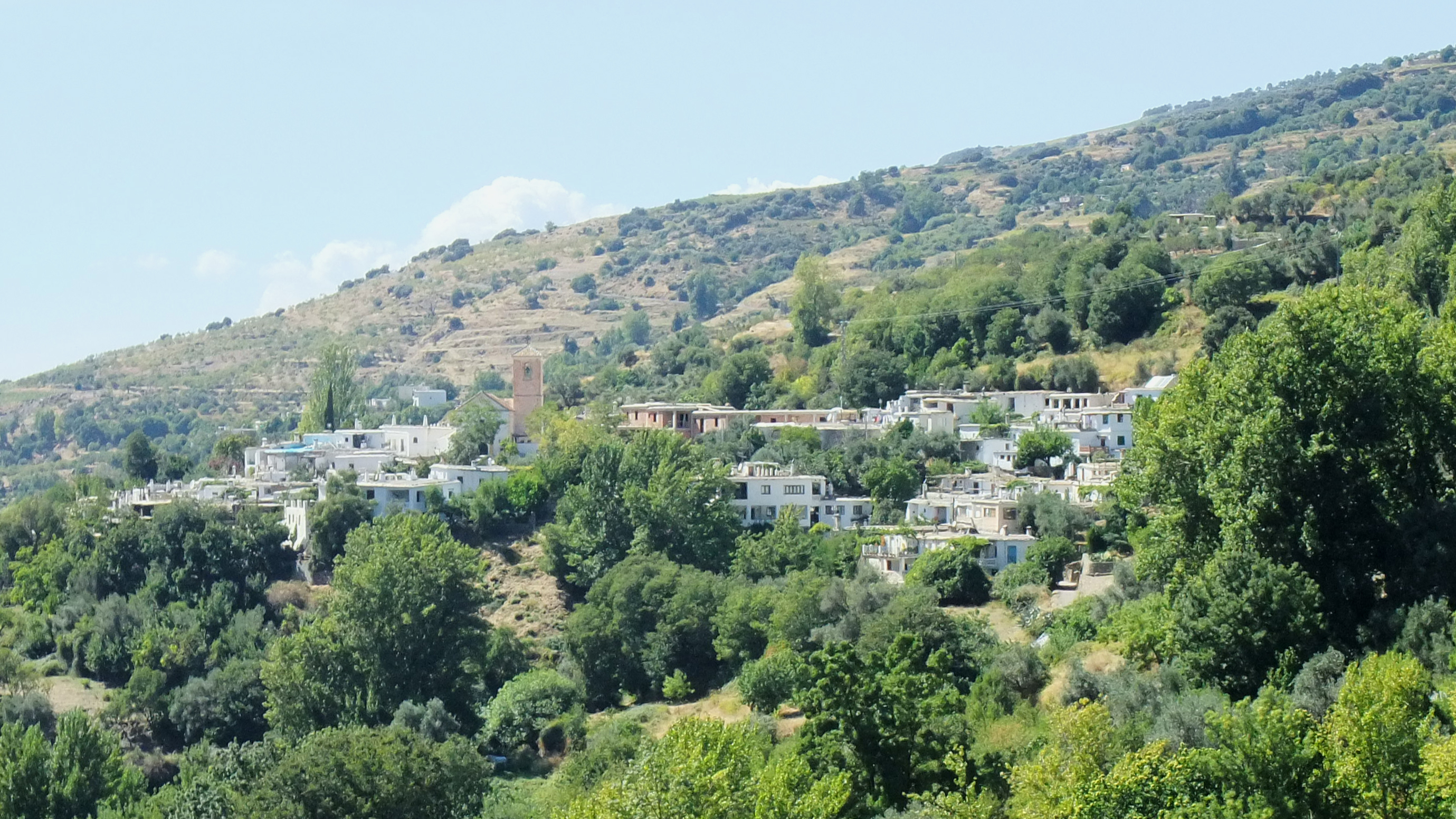
- Village of Ferreirola, in La Taha municipality

- Coat of arms

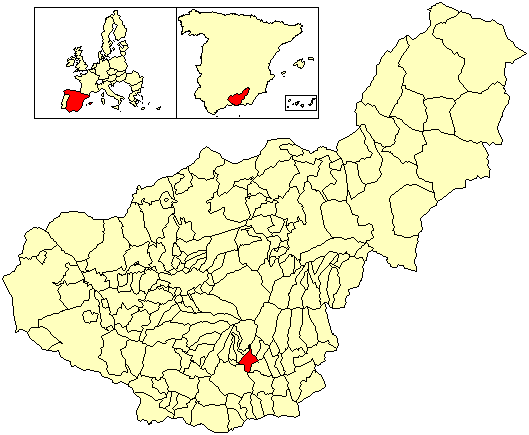
- Location of La Taha

- Location in Spain
- Coordinates: 36°56′N 3°19′W
- Country: Spain
- Autonomous community: Andalusia
- Province: Granada
- Comarca: Alpujarras
- Judicial district: Órgiva

Government
  - Alcalde: Marcelo Avilés Gómez (2021) (Partido Popular)

Area
  - Total: 26 km^{2} (10 sq mi)
- Elevation: 1,295 m (4,249 ft)

Population (2025-01-01)
  - Total: 777
  - Density: 30/km^{2} (77/sq mi)
- Demonym(s): Bárbaro, -ra Pitreño, -ña Talabita
- Time zone: UTC+1 (CET)
  - Summer (DST): UTC+2 (CEST)
- Postal code: 18414
- Website: Official website

La Taha, is a municipality in the Alpujarras region of the province of Granada, Spain. The modern municipality consists of three distinct villages, though several of these are themselves clusters of distinct settlements. It lies to the east of the villages of the Río Poqueira gorge, and to the south and west of Trevélez. The villages are all on south-facing slopes overlooking the Río Trevélez.

The villages of La Taha are:

- Pitres, with the smaller settlement of Capilerilla above it; this is the administrative centre, the largest of the three villages, and the only one on the through road
- Mecina Fondales, which comprises Mecina, Mecinilla, and Fondales
- Ferreirola, which is below the smaller village of Atalbéitar

In guidebooks and other sources, some other neighbouring villages are often included in La Taha, though they do not belong to the municipality. These include Pórtugos and Busquístar.

The name La Taha comes from Arabic Tá, meaning "obedience". Under the Nasrid kings of Granada, the region was divided into a number of administrative districts called "tahas", each containing several settlements; for example, the villages of the Poquiera gorge formed "La Taha de Poqueira". Modern La Taha is the only one of these districts to have retained the name.

There is a modest tourist trade in La Taha, though the villages do not attract the intense interest either of the Poqueira river villages or of Trevélez. Pitres has a market on Friday. The GR 7 long-distance footpath passes through the municipality.

Atalbeitar is a village where you can learn about the original characteristics of the houses and streets of the Alpujarras, due to the lack of new buildings that other touristic villages have been constructing.

== See also ==
- List of municipalities in Granada

== Bibliography ==
- Cressier, Patrice (1984). "Le chateau et la division territoriale dans l'Alpujarra médiévale: du ḥinṣ à la ṭāʿa" (PDF). Melanges de la Casa de Velázquez (20): 115–144. Existe traducción al castellano en: *Cressier, Patrice (1992). "El castillo y la división territorial en la Alpujarra medieval: del ḥinṣ a la ṭāʿa" (PDF). Estudios de arqueología medieval en Almería. Almería: Instituto de Estudios Almerienses: 7–48.
