= Órgiva =

- Municipality
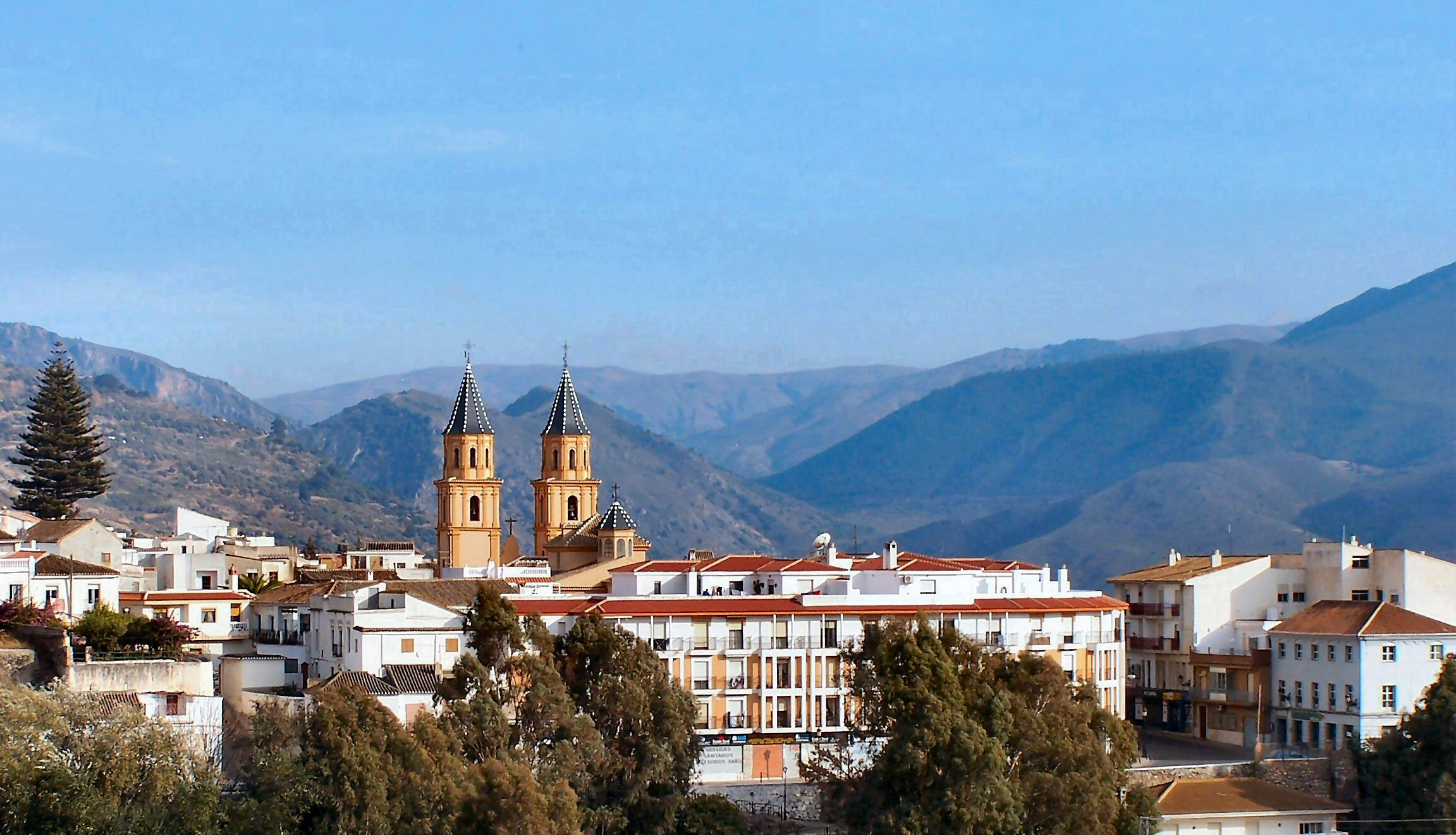
- View of Órgiva looking eastward

- Flag Coat of arms

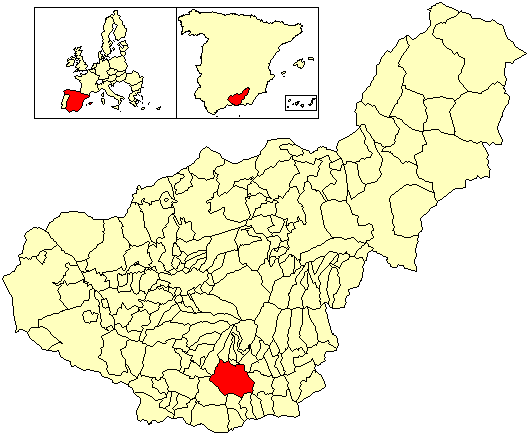
- Location of Órgiva

- Location of Órgiva in the Province of Granada Location of Órgiva in Andalusia Location of Órgiva in Spain
- Coordinates: 36°54′N 3°25′W
- Country: Spain
- Autonomous community: Andalusia
- Province: Granada
- Comarca: Alpujarra Granadina
- Judicial district: Órgiva

Government
  - Alcaldesa: María de los Ángeles Blanco López (2007) (PSOE)

Area
  - Total: 134.14 km^{2} (51.79 sq mi)
- Elevation: 450 m (1,480 ft)

Population (2025-01-01)
  - Total: 5,728
  - Density: 42.70/km^{2} (110.6/sq mi)
- Demonym(s): Orgiveño, -a
- Time zone: UTC+1 (CET)
  - Summer (DST): UTC+2 (CEST)
- Postal code: 18400 (Órgiva); 18410 (Bayacas); 18418 (Las Barreras y Los Tablones); 18710 (Alcázar)
- Website: Official website

Órgiva (pronounced [ˈoɾxiβa]) is a Spanish town municipality in comarca of Alpujarra Granadina (which is located within the larger Alpujarras region) in the province of Granada, Andalusia. It has a population of around 6,000 and lies in the Alpujarra valley between the Sierra de Lújar and Sierra Nevada.

== Overview ==
Despite its small population, Órgiva has 72 nationalities registered resident, and is known as one of the most multicultural municipalities in Spain. In recent years it has become a popular tourist destination for those visiting the Alpujarras, and the town is often described as "the gateway" to this area. Bus services connect Órgiva to the coast and Málaga, to Lanjarón and the provincial capital Granada, and to the villages of the Alpujarras. A large market is held on Thursdays. The town is host to a newly opened municipal swimming pool and football pitch. There are three well known alternative communities in the area, the most famous being Beneficio.

== Gallery ==
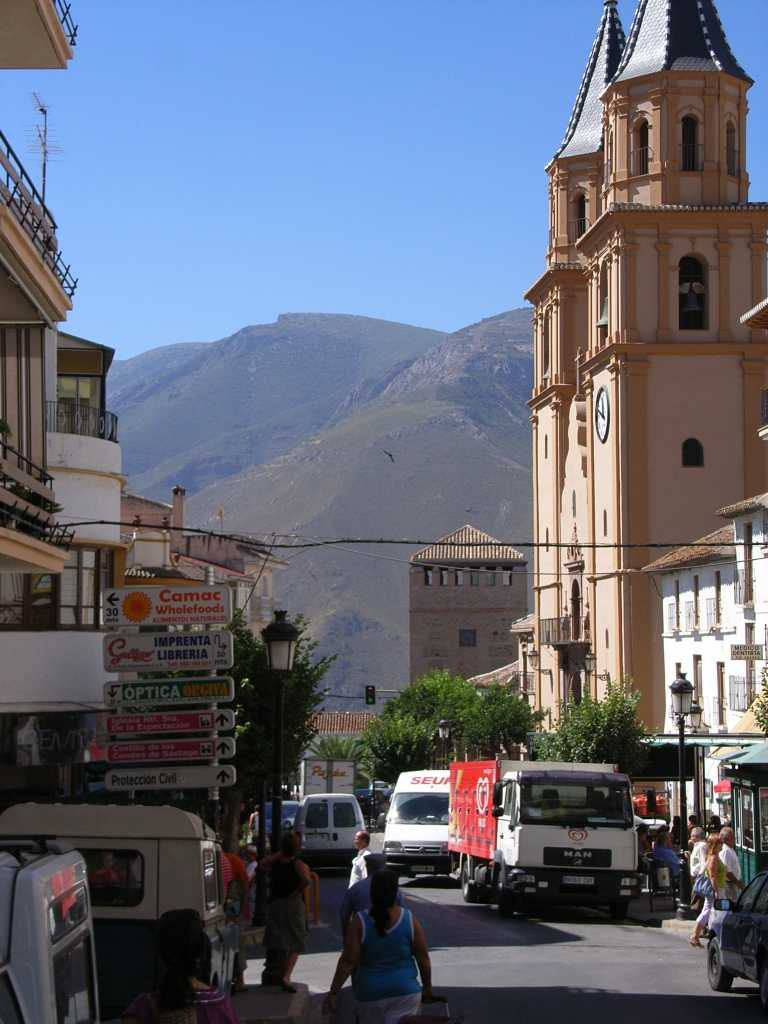
Town centre

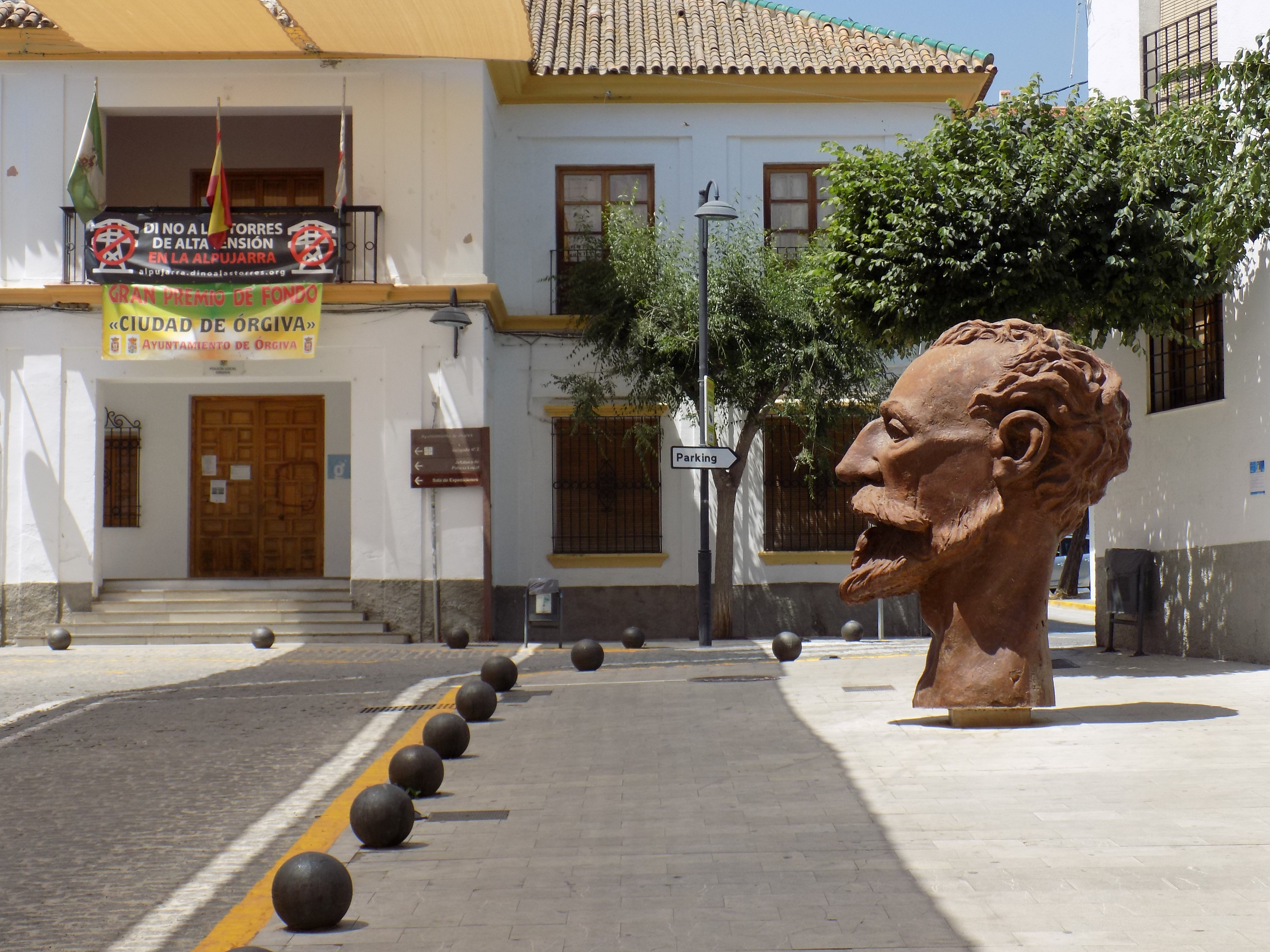
A sculpture of Don Quijote, the famous creation of Cervantes, in Orgiva.

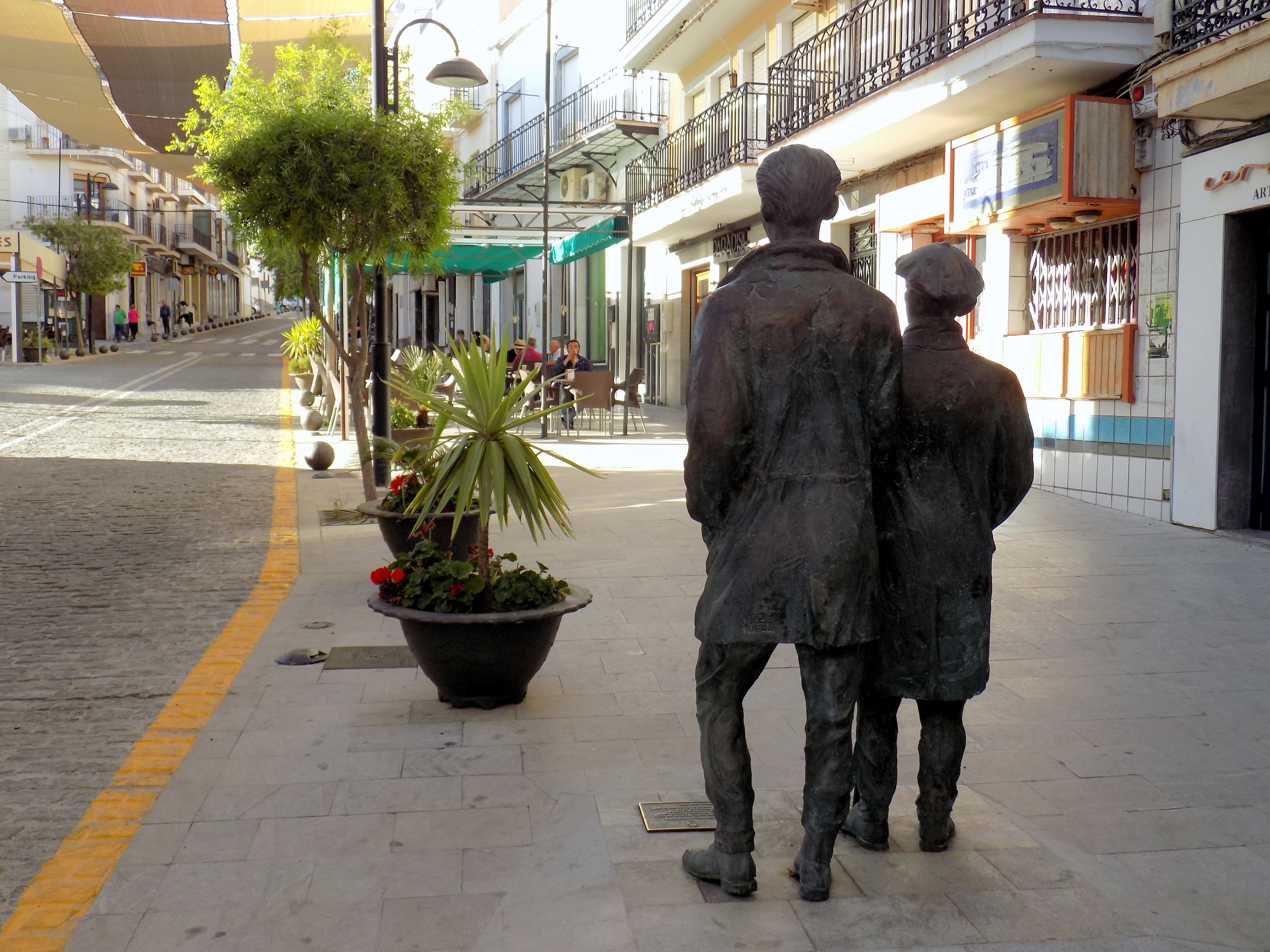
Statue of Lorca and Falla, Órgiva

== See also ==
- List of municipalities in Granada
