= Juviles =

- Municipality
- Flag Coat of arms

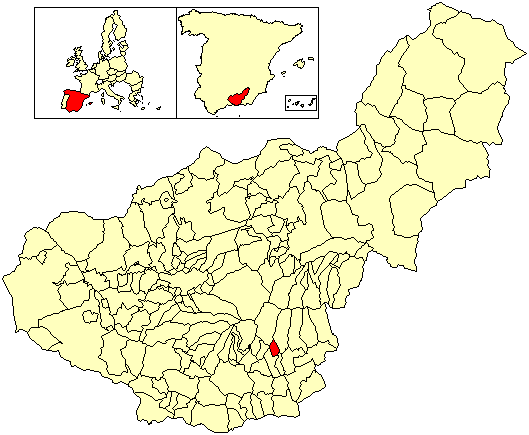
- Location of Juviles

- Location in Spain
- Coordinates: 36°57′N 3°13′W
- Country: Spain
- Autonomous community: Andalusia
- Province: Granada
- Comarca: Alpujarras
- Judicial district: Órgiva

Government
  - Alcaldesa: María Lurdes Molina Henares (2007) (PP)

Area
  - Total: 15 km^{2} (5.8 sq mi)
- Elevation: 1,255 m (4,117 ft)

Population (2025-01-01)
  - Total: 140
  - Density: 9.3/km^{2} (24/sq mi)
- Demonym(s): Juvileño, -a
- Time zone: UTC+1 (CET)
  - Summer (DST): UTC+2 (CEST)
- Postal code: 18452
- Website: Official website

Juviles is a village and municipality in the central Alpujarras, in the province of Granada in Spain. The village is located at 36° 57' north and 3° 13' east, and stands at an altitude of 1,255 metres, on the road from Trevélez to Ugíjar. The municipality has an area of 12 square km, and its population in 2003 was estimated at 160.

Although traditionally agricultural, the area under cultivation in the municipality is now only 35 hectares. However, like Trevélez it is known for its air-cured ham. In Moorish times it was a centre of the silk industry.

A fortress was established in Juviles in the 8th century, though the origins of the village are probably older. It acquired strategic importance during the Middle Ages, often serving as a refuge for local people in times of civil strife. In 913 it was conquered by Aberramán III. From the 12th to the 16th century the village served as the administrative centre of a "taha" of 12 settlements with 23 smaller hamlets associated with them. Following the 1500 morisco rebellion, Fernando the Catholic destroyed the fortress as a measure against further revolts; its ruins can still be seen. In 1572, as in other Alpujarran areas, the remaining morisco population was replaced by Christians brought from Castile.

== See also ==
- List of municipalities in Granada
