= Pórtugos =

Coordinates: 36°57′N 3°19′W

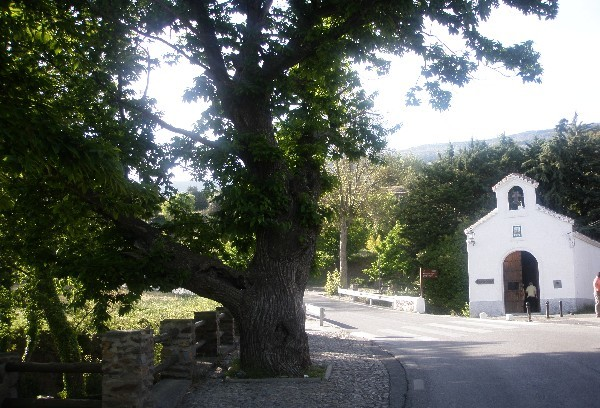

- Flag Coat of arms

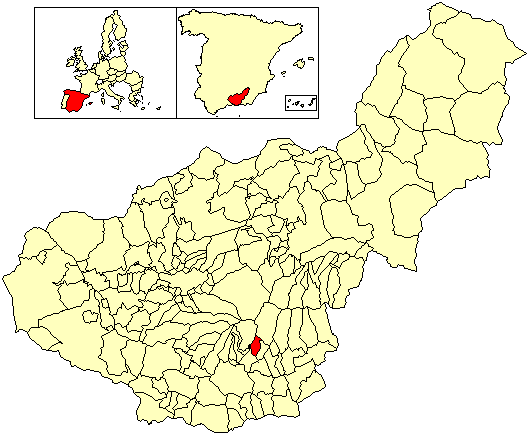

- Location in Spain.
- Country: Spain
- Autonomous community: Andalusia
- Province: Granada

Area
  - Total: 21 km^{2} (8.1 sq mi)
- Elevation: 1,303 m (4,275 ft)

Population (2025-01-01)
  - Total: 372
  - Density: 18/km^{2} (46/sq mi)
- Time zone: UTC+1 (CET)
  - Summer (DST): UTC+2 (CEST)
- Website: www.portugos.es

Pórtugos is a municipality in the province of Granada, Spain. As of 2010, it has a population of 401 inhabitants.

== See also ==
- List of municipalities in Granada
