= Lanjarón =

- Municipality
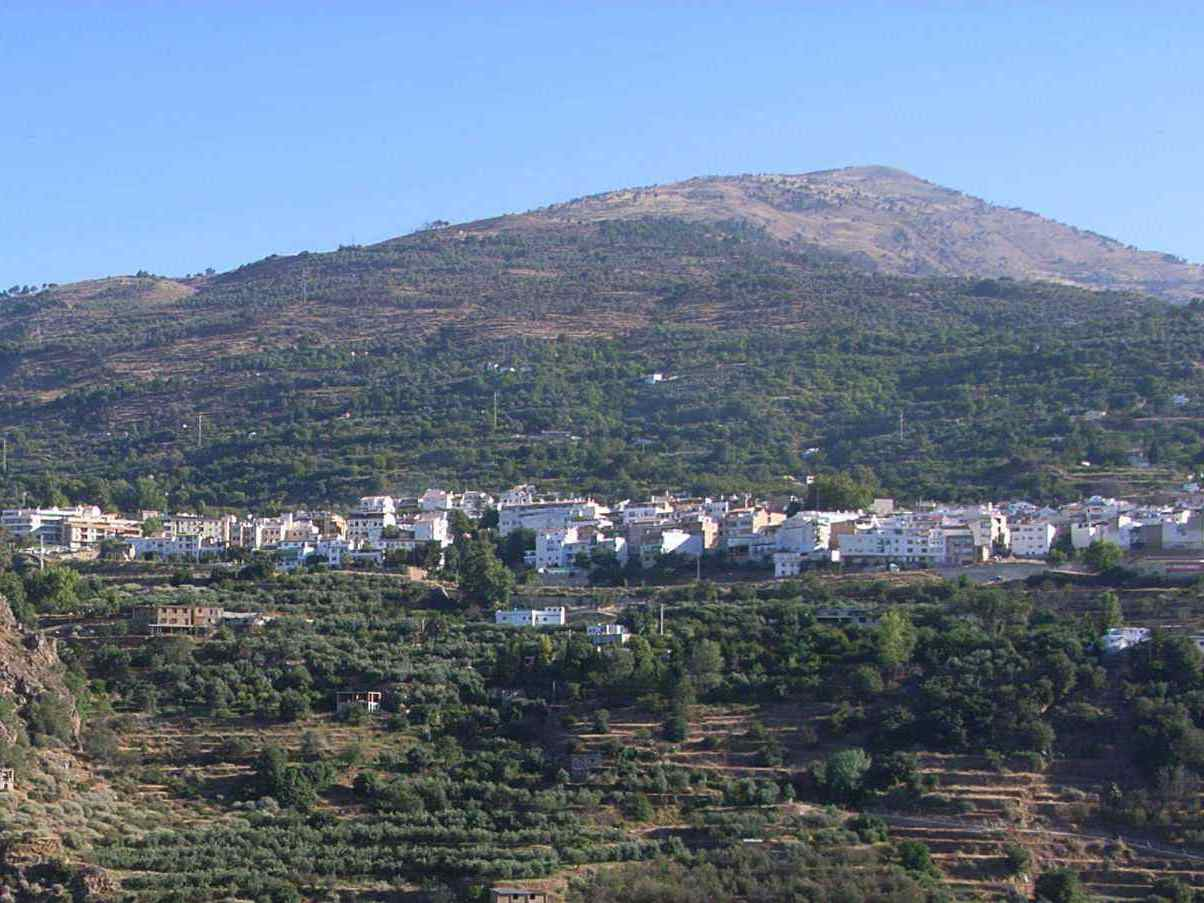
- Lanjarón overview.

- Flag Coat of arms

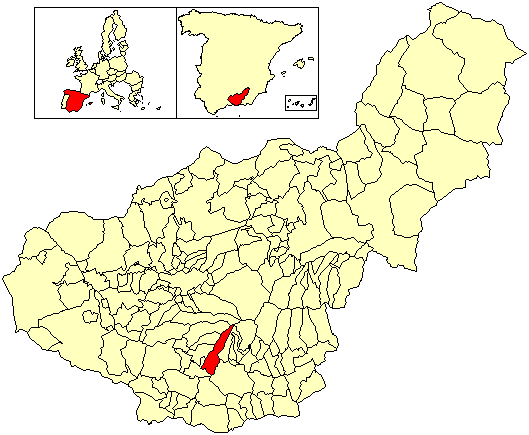
- Location of Lanjarón

- Location in Spain
- Coordinates: 36°55′N 3°28′W
- Country: Spain
- Autonomous community: Andalusia
- Province: Granada
- Comarca: Alpujarras
- Judicial district: Órgiva

Government
  - Alcalde: Eric Escobedo (2020) (Spanish Partido popular - PP)

Area
  - Total: 60.38 km^{2} (23.31 sq mi)
- Elevation: 659 m (2,162 ft)

Population (2025-01-01)
  - Total: 3,708
  - Density: 61.41/km^{2} (159.1/sq mi)
- Demonym(s): Lanjaronense o cañonero, -ra
- Time zone: UTC+1 (CET)
  - Summer (DST): UTC+2 (CEST)
- Postal code: 18420

Lanjarón (pronounced [laŋxaˈɾon]) is a municipality and town in the Alpujarras area in the province of Granada in Andalusia, Spain.

Lanjarón has a ruined castle and chalybeate baths.

On the 23rd of June, the town of Lanjaron celebrates its annual fiesta of San Juan, known as the biggest water fight in Spain. Starting at midnight until 1 am, the streets are crowded by people with buckets, water pistols, fire hoses and lorries filled with water.

== Fountains ==
Lanjarón has a series of fountains distributed through the streets and plazas. Most are accompanied by a short phrase or poem, usually by Federico García Lorca, and are used by locals and visitors. There are numerous fountains in the town, which carry chlorinated water, and three fountains with fresh spring water on the outskirts.

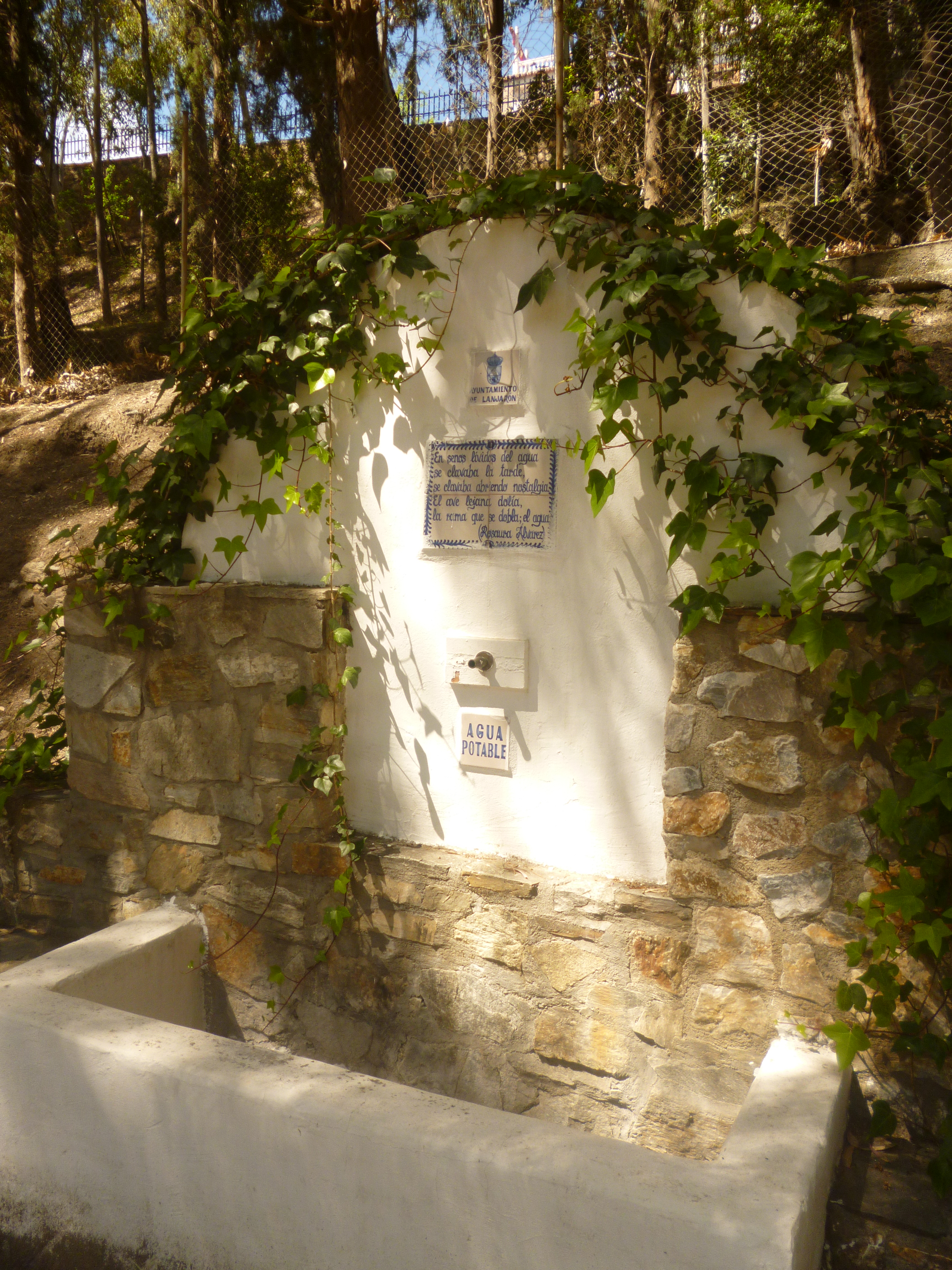

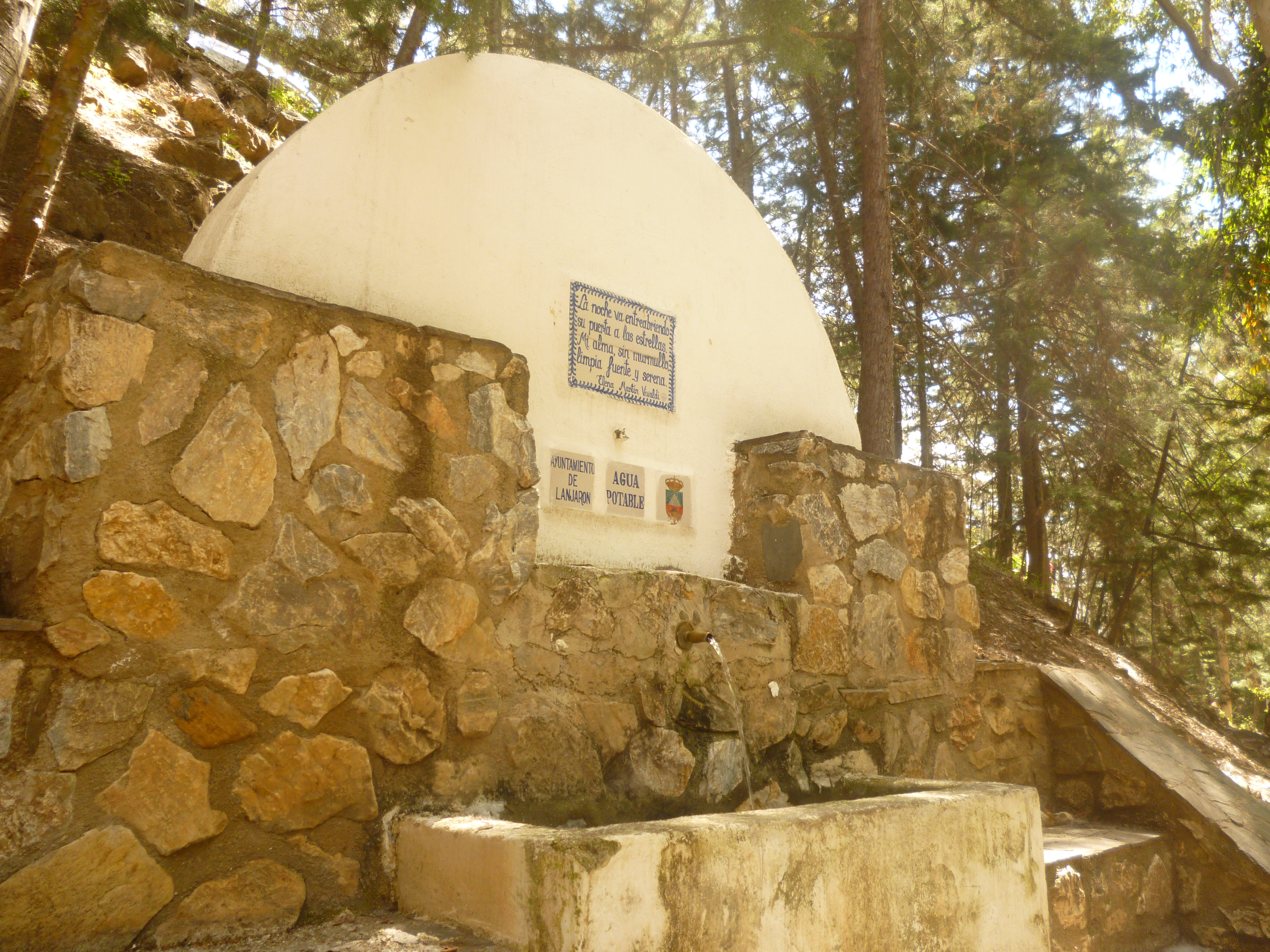

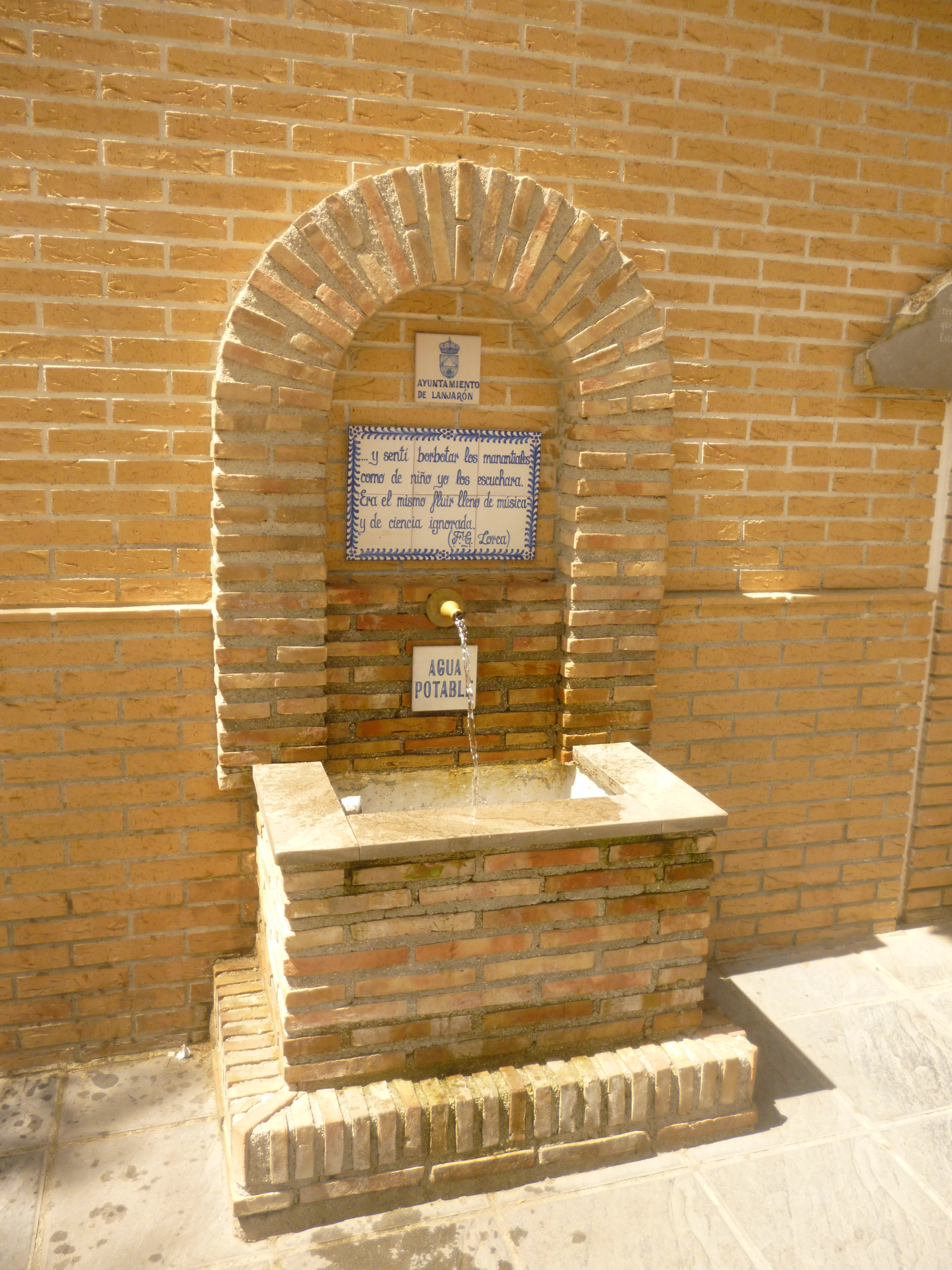

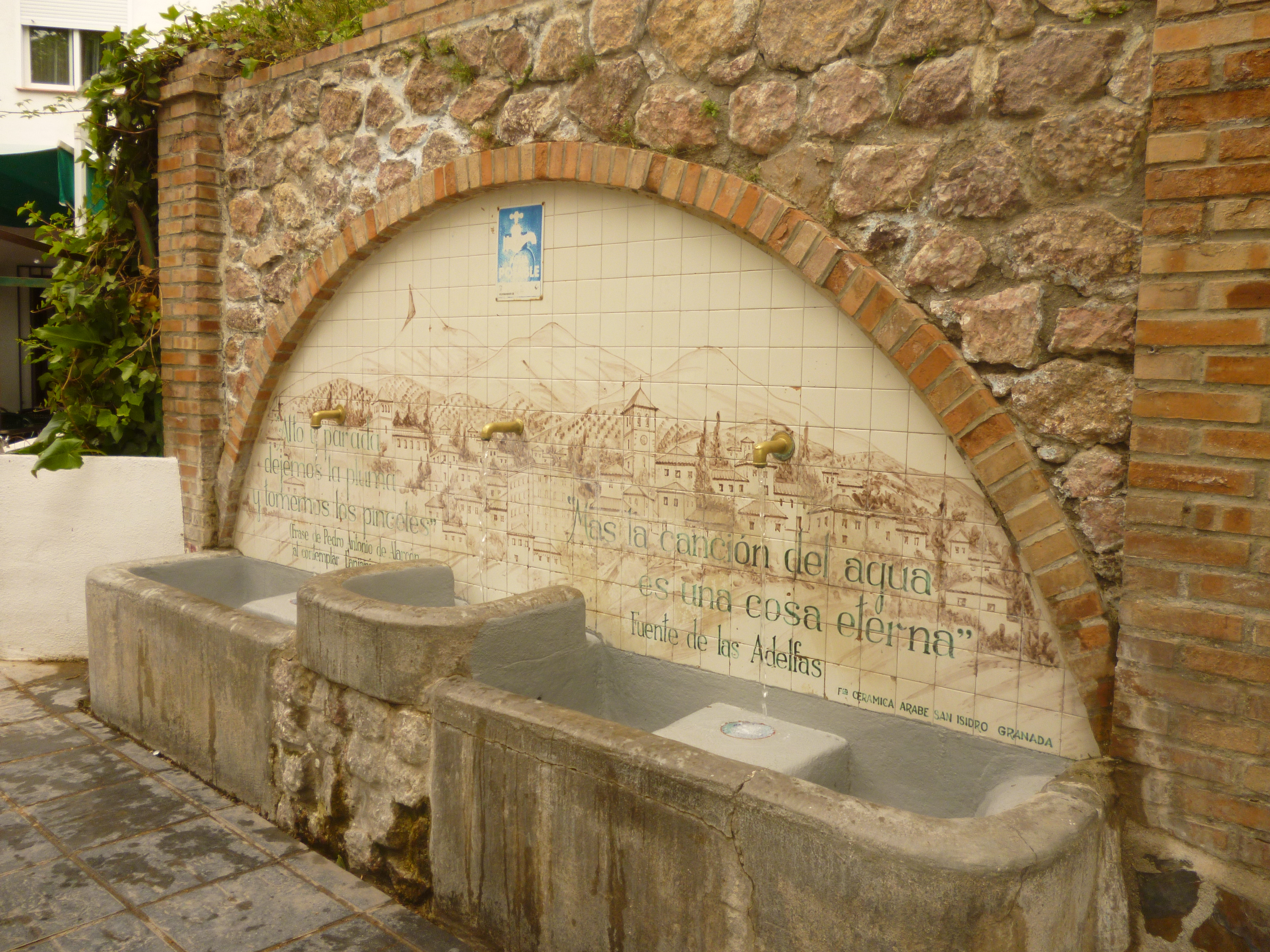

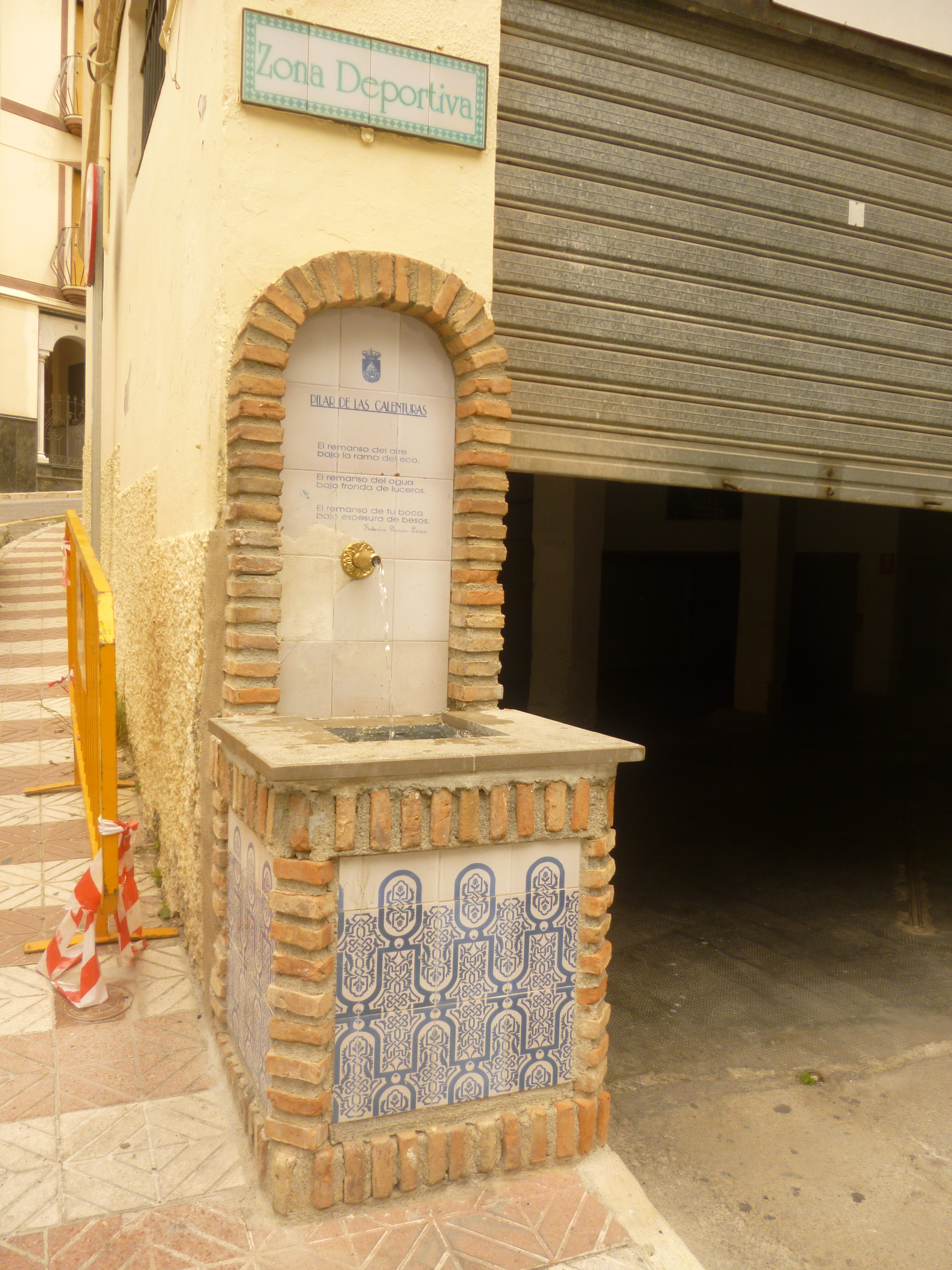

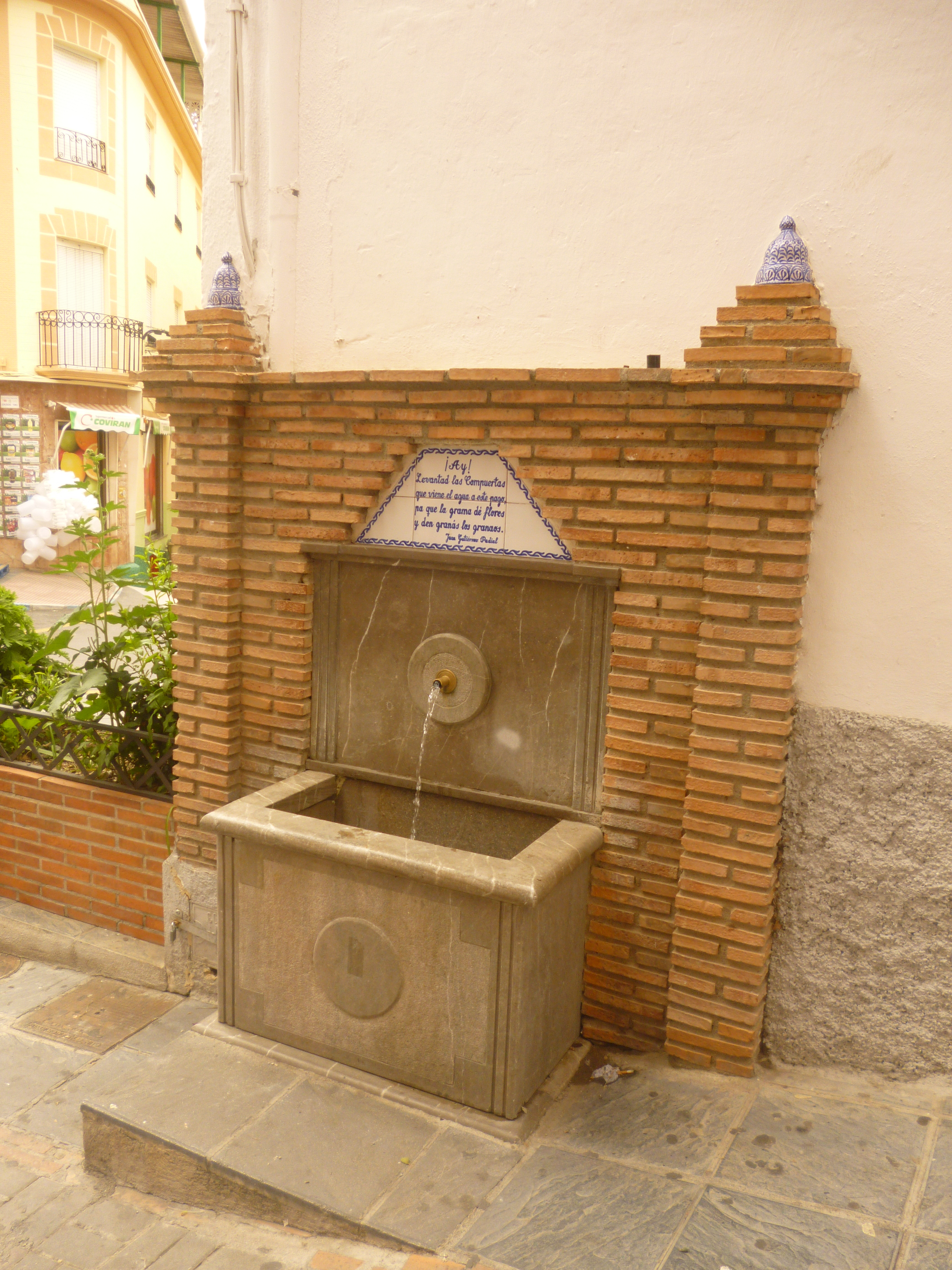

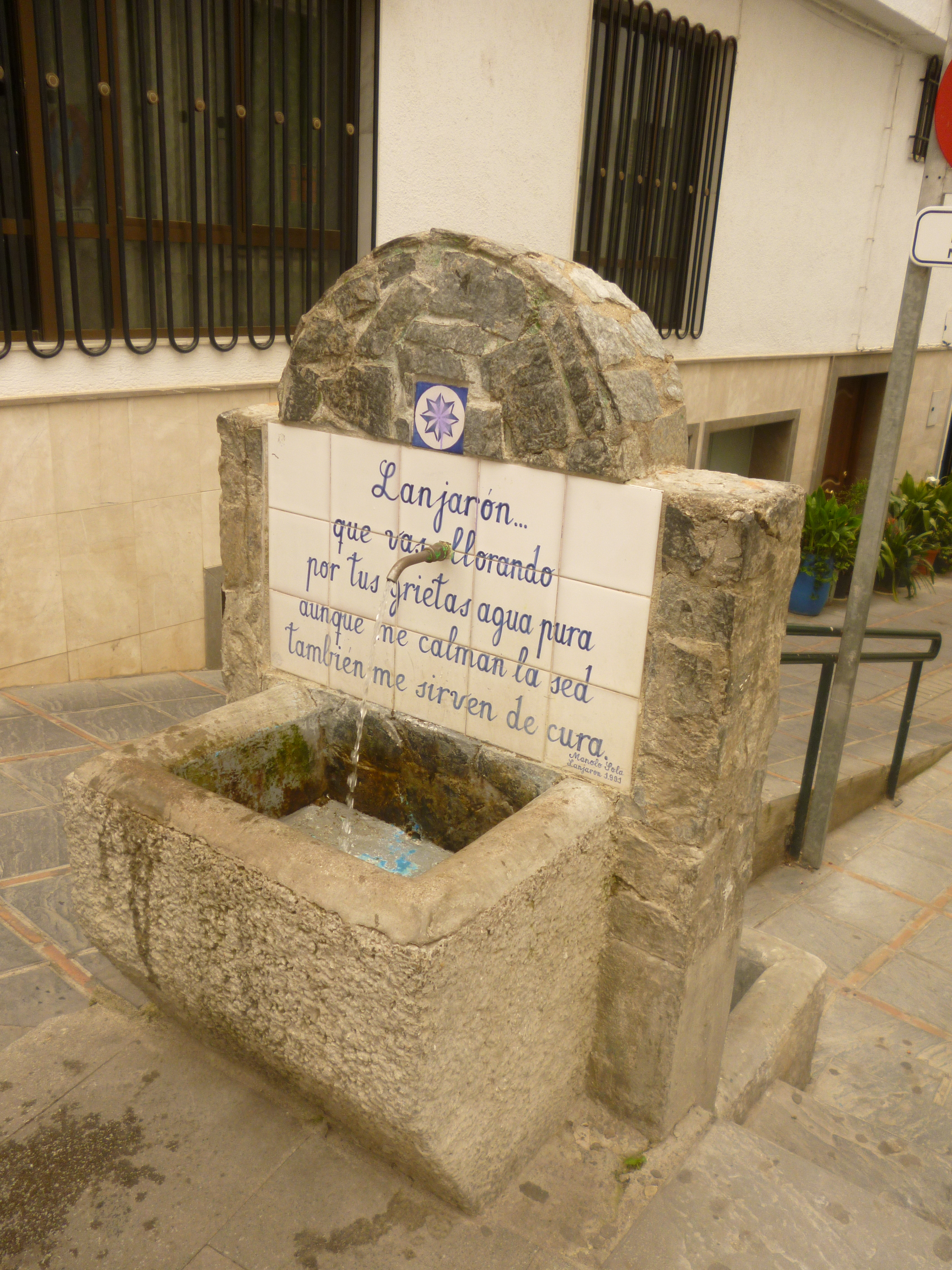

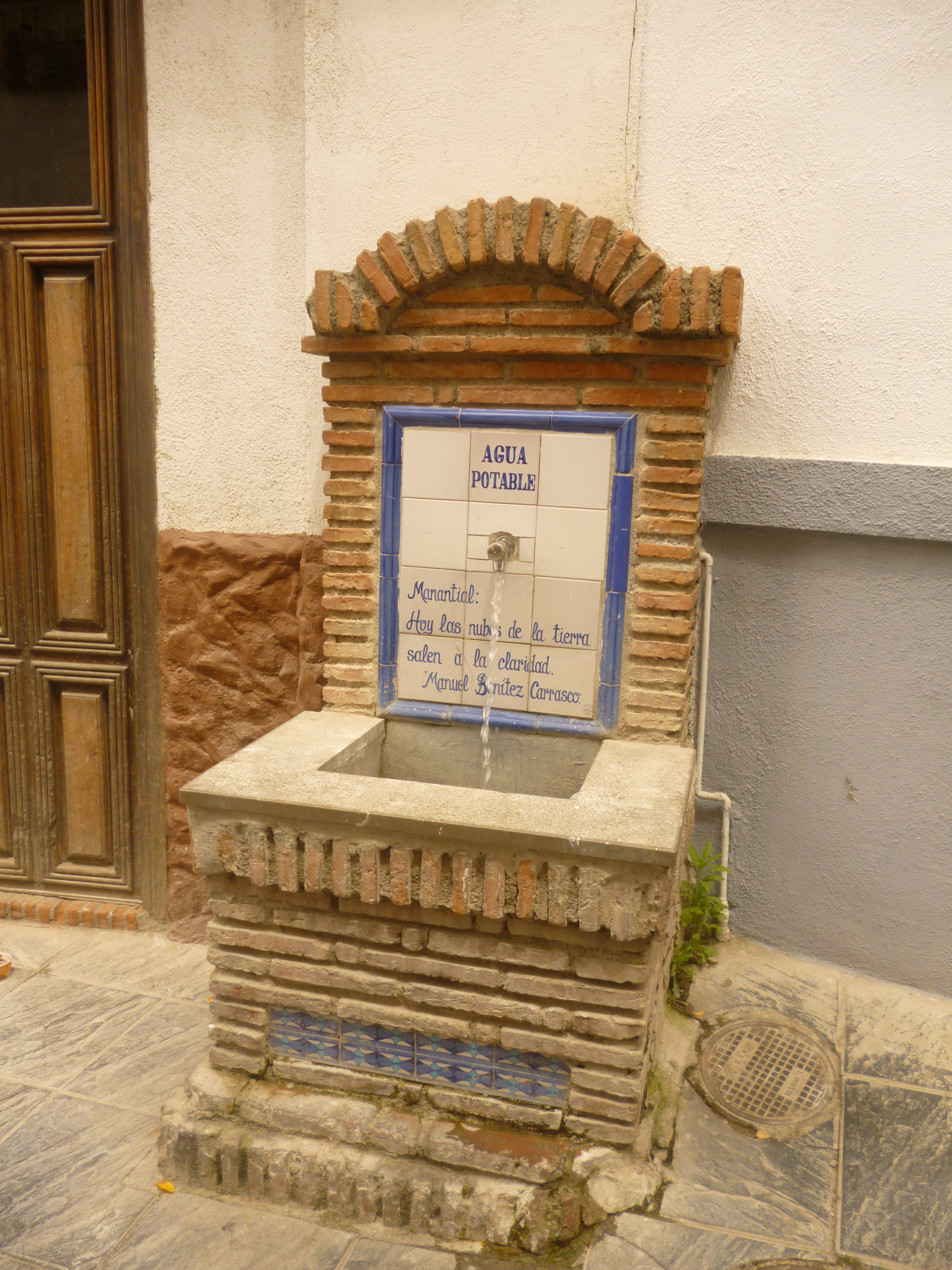

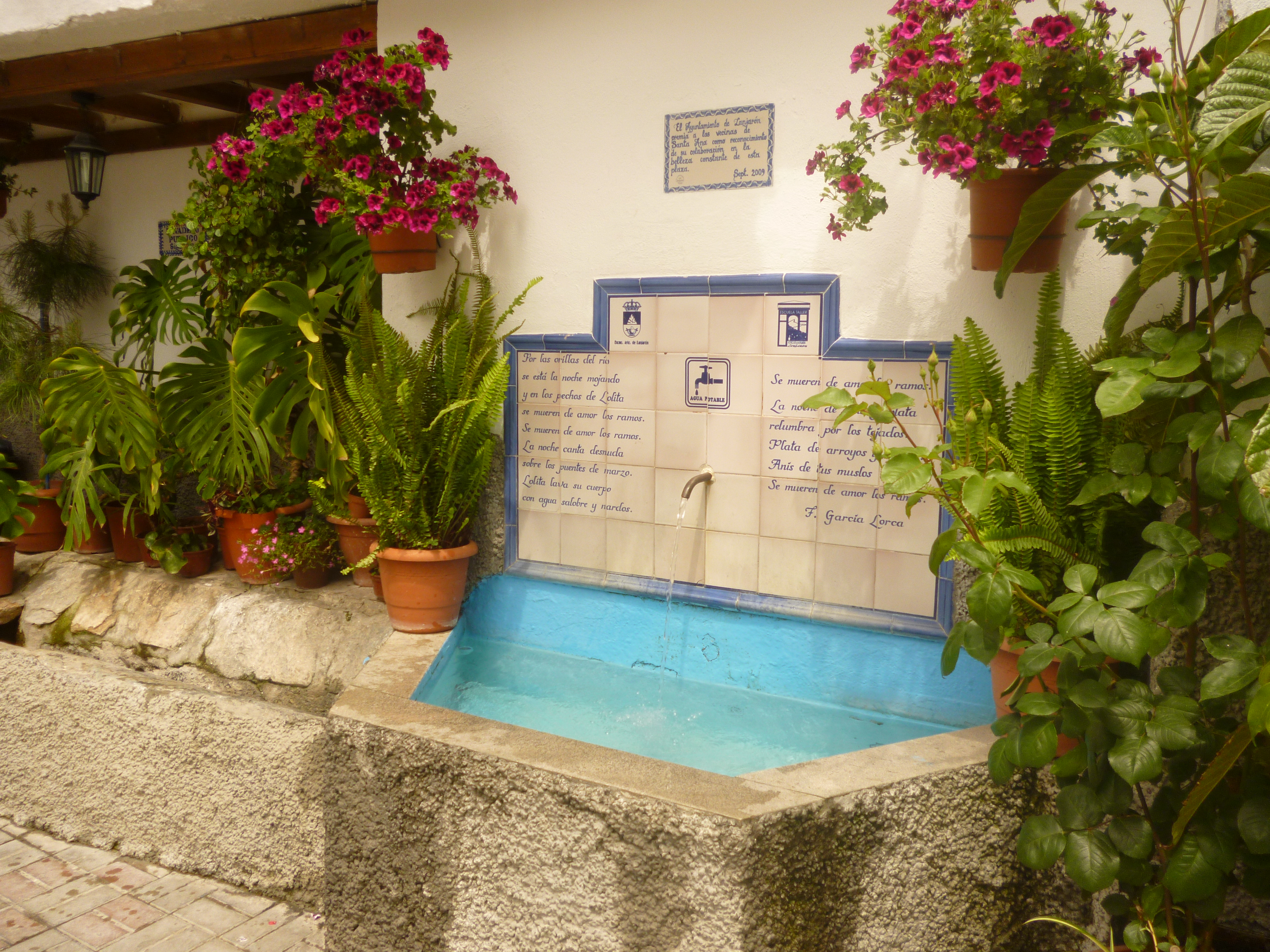

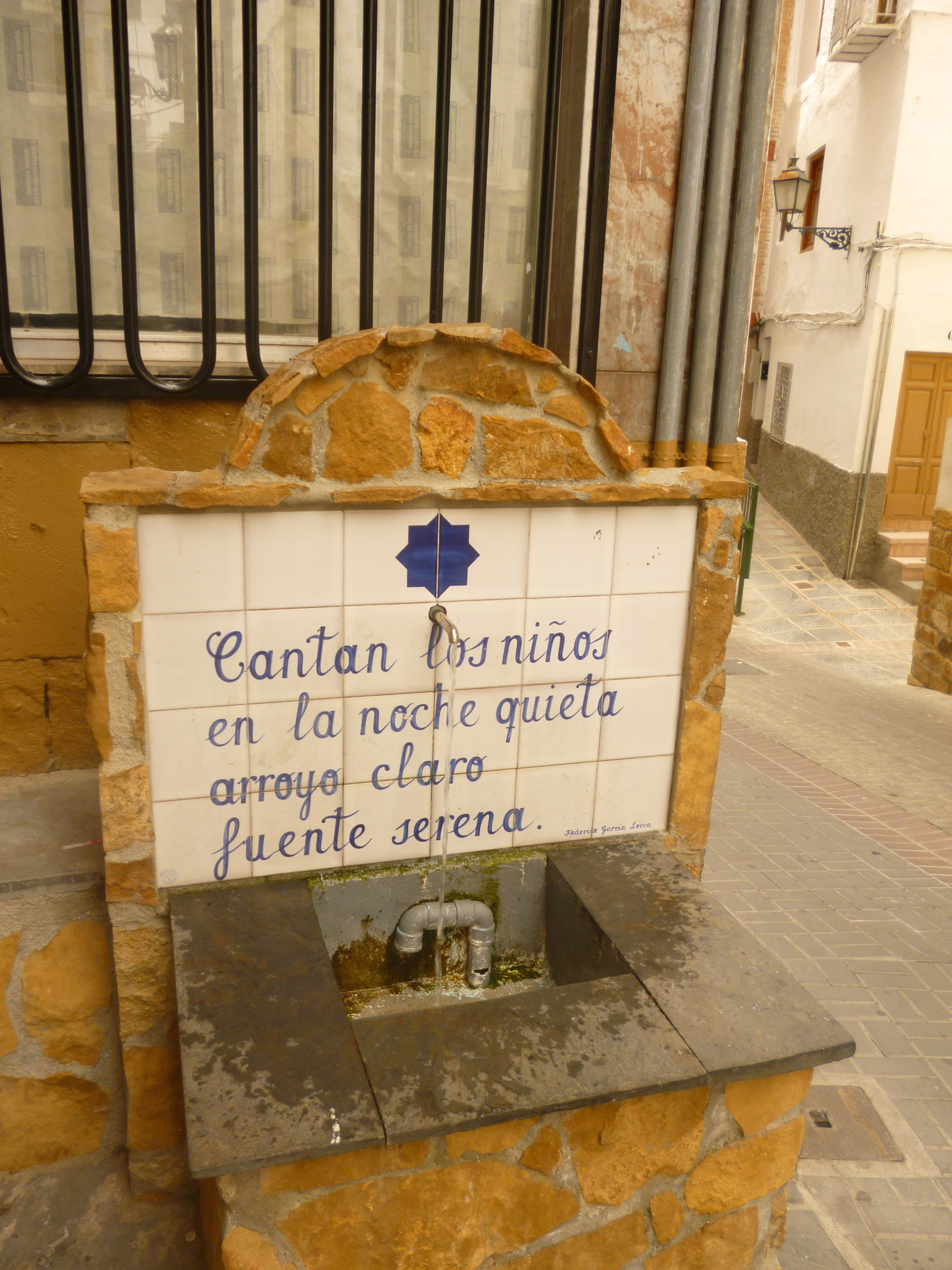

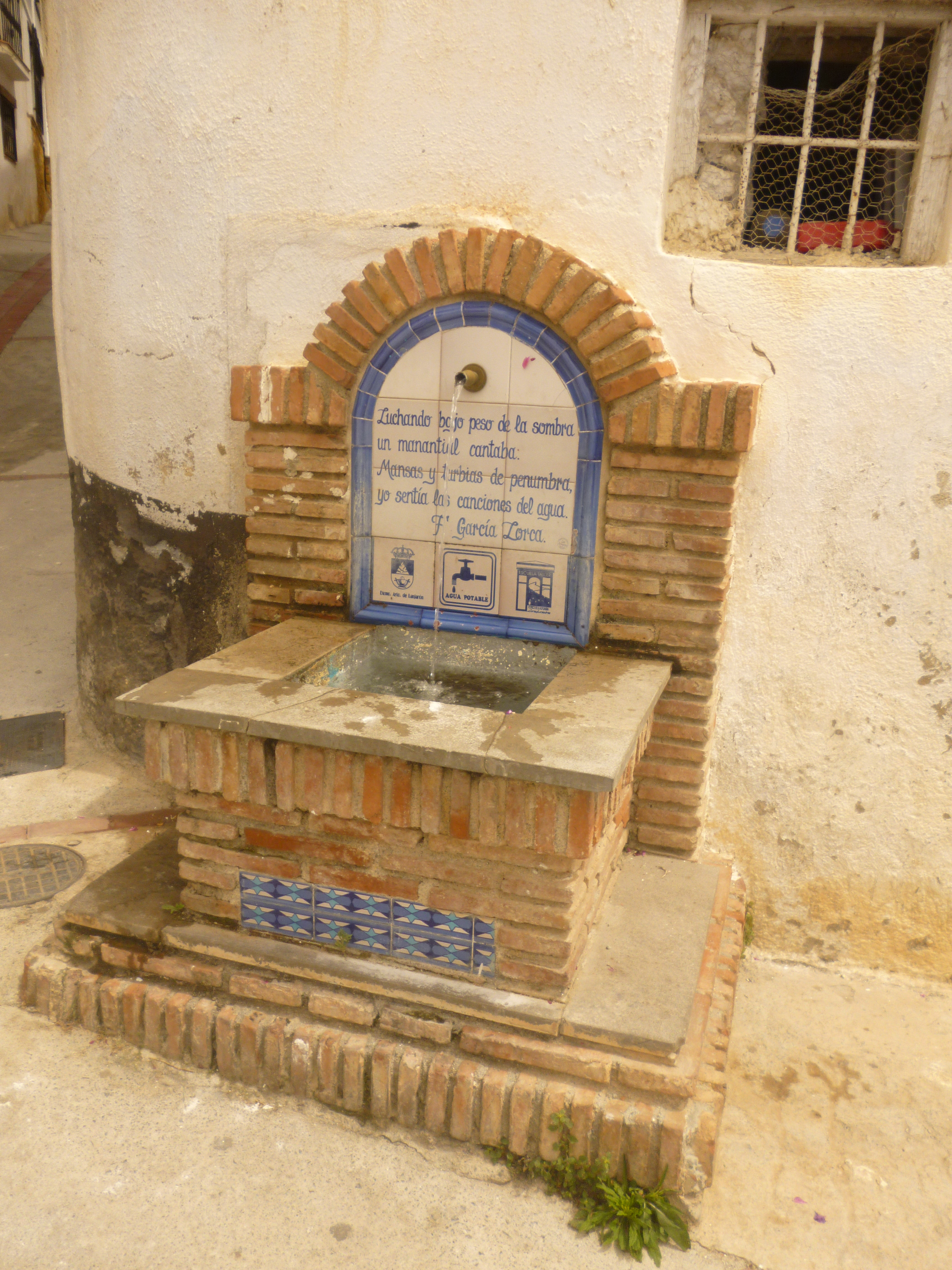

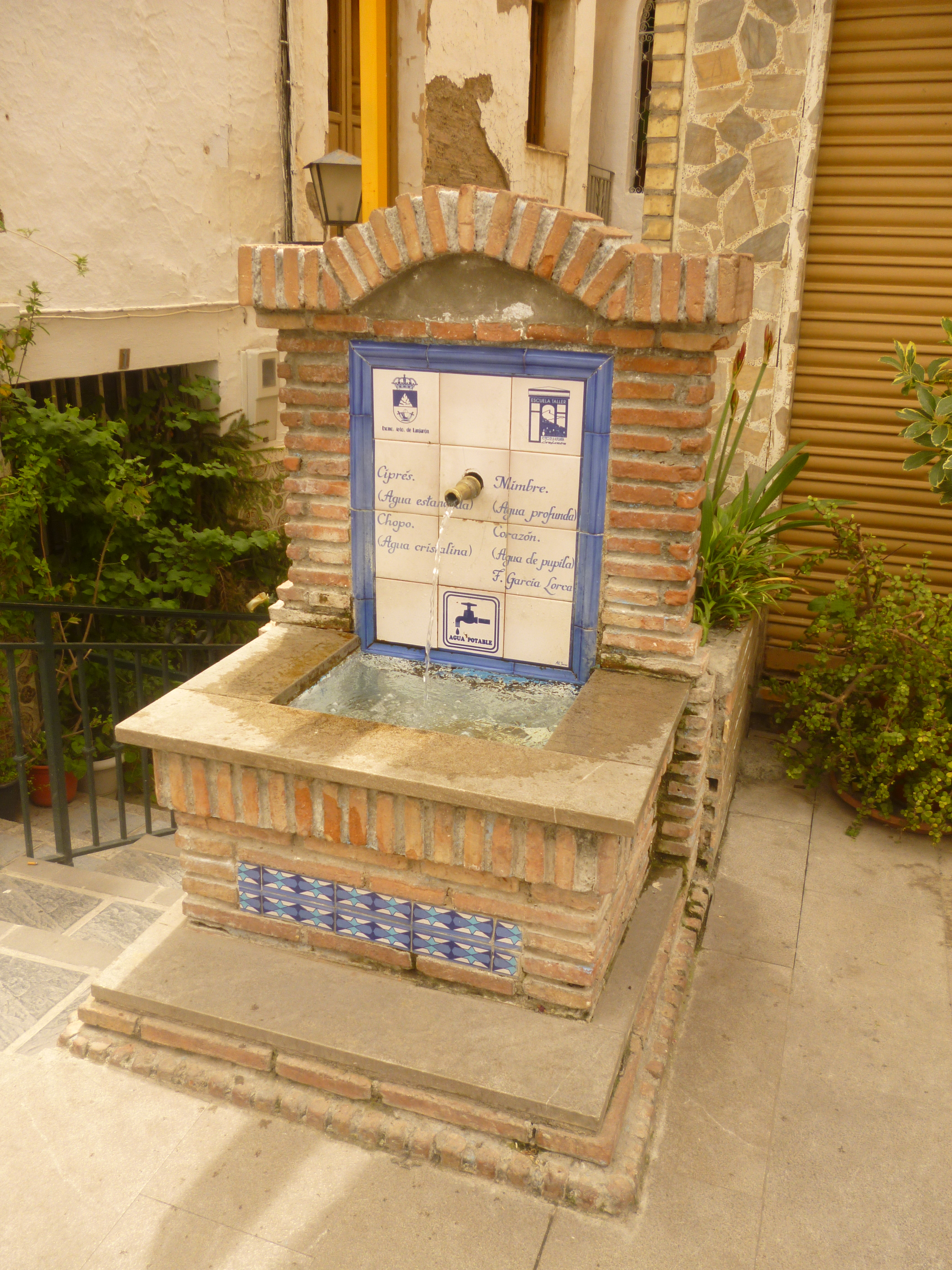

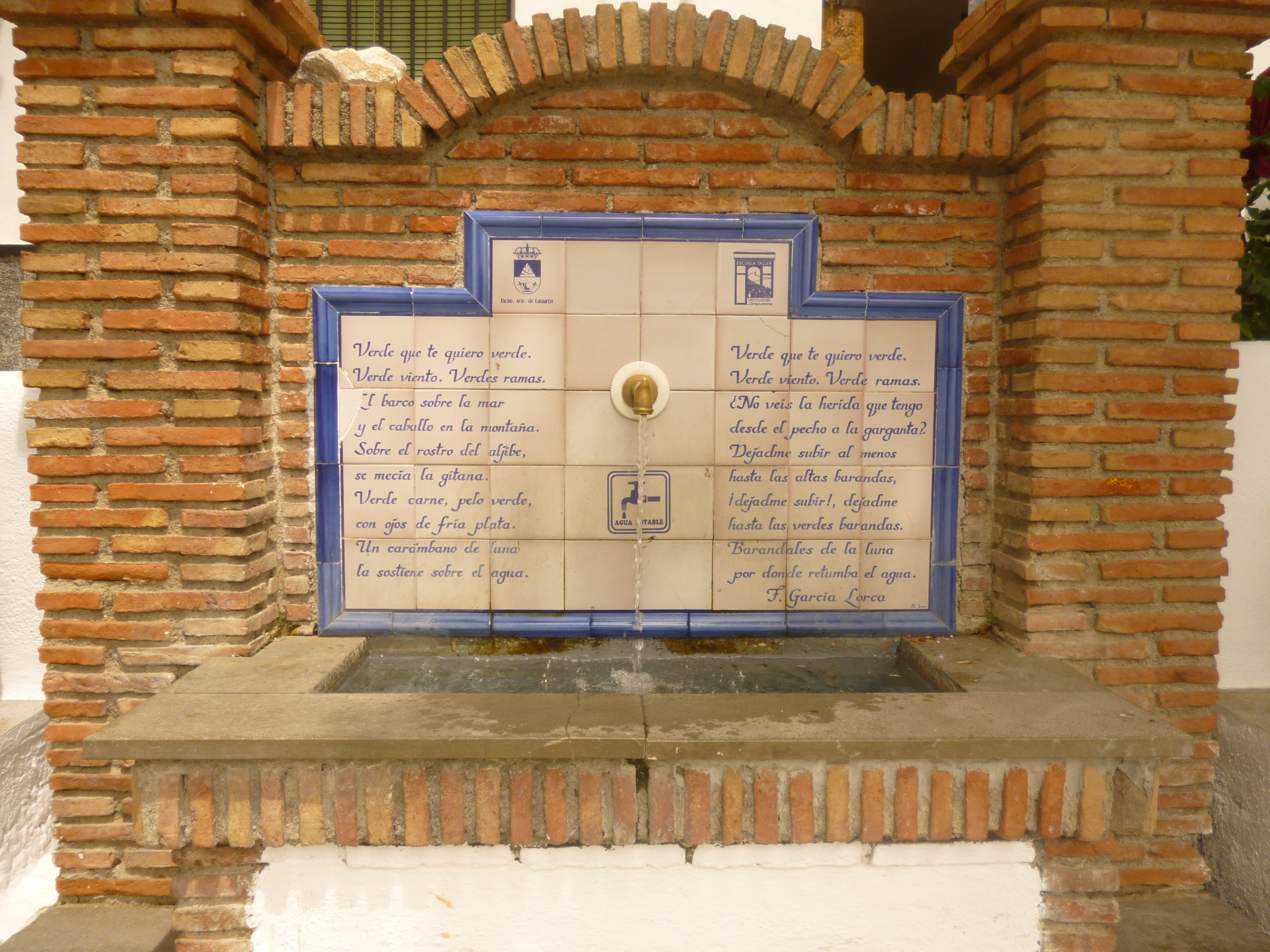

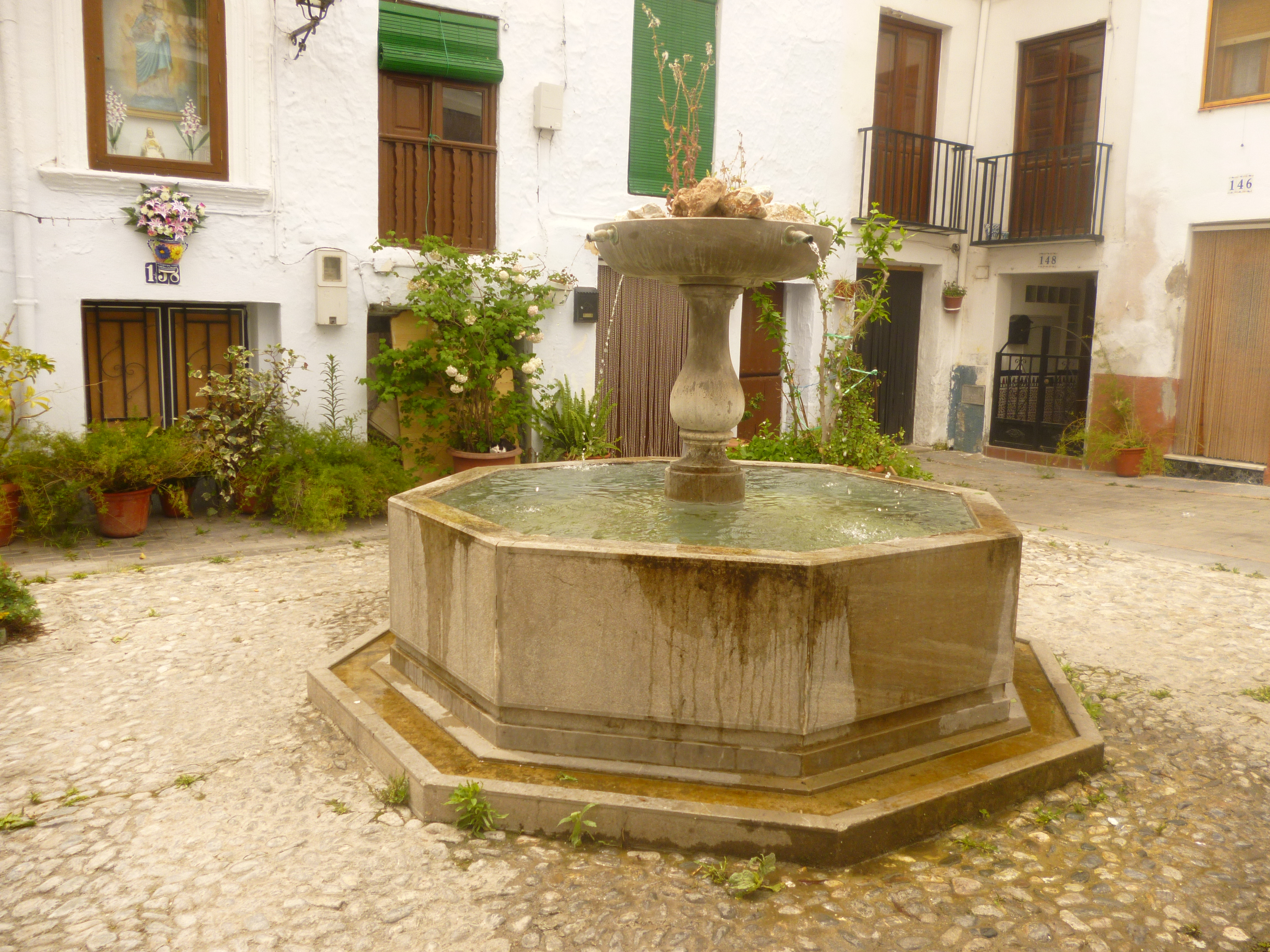

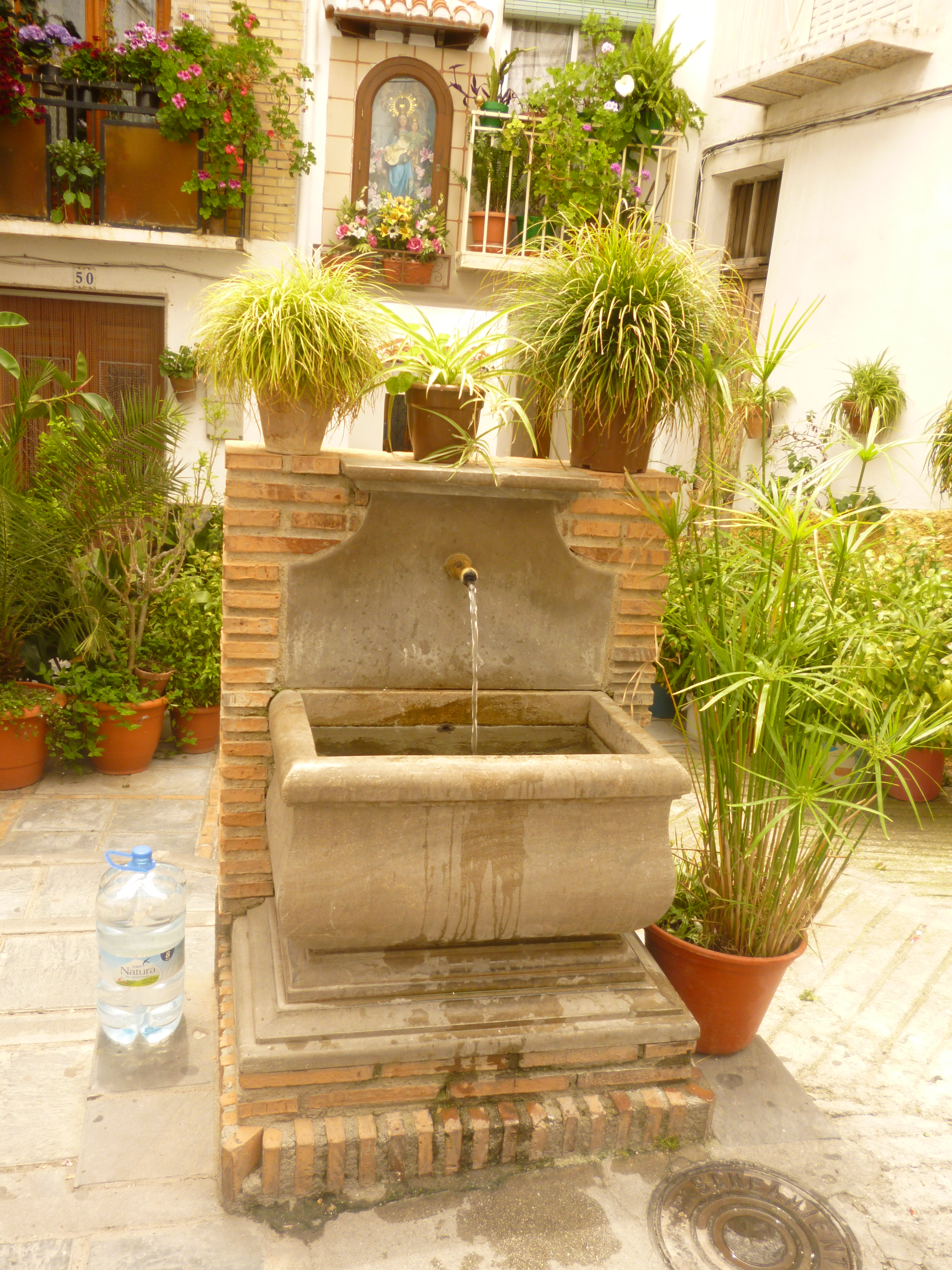

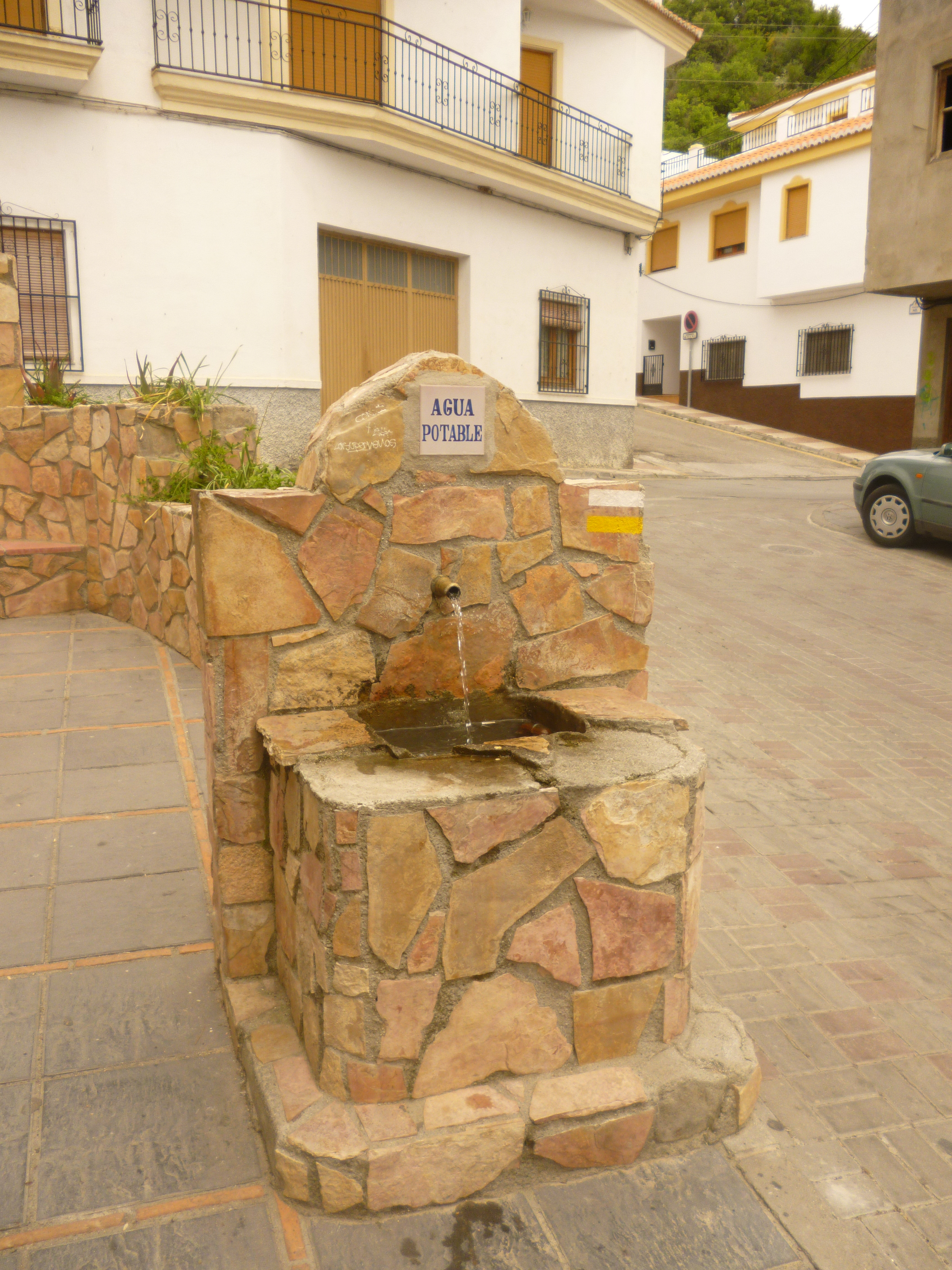

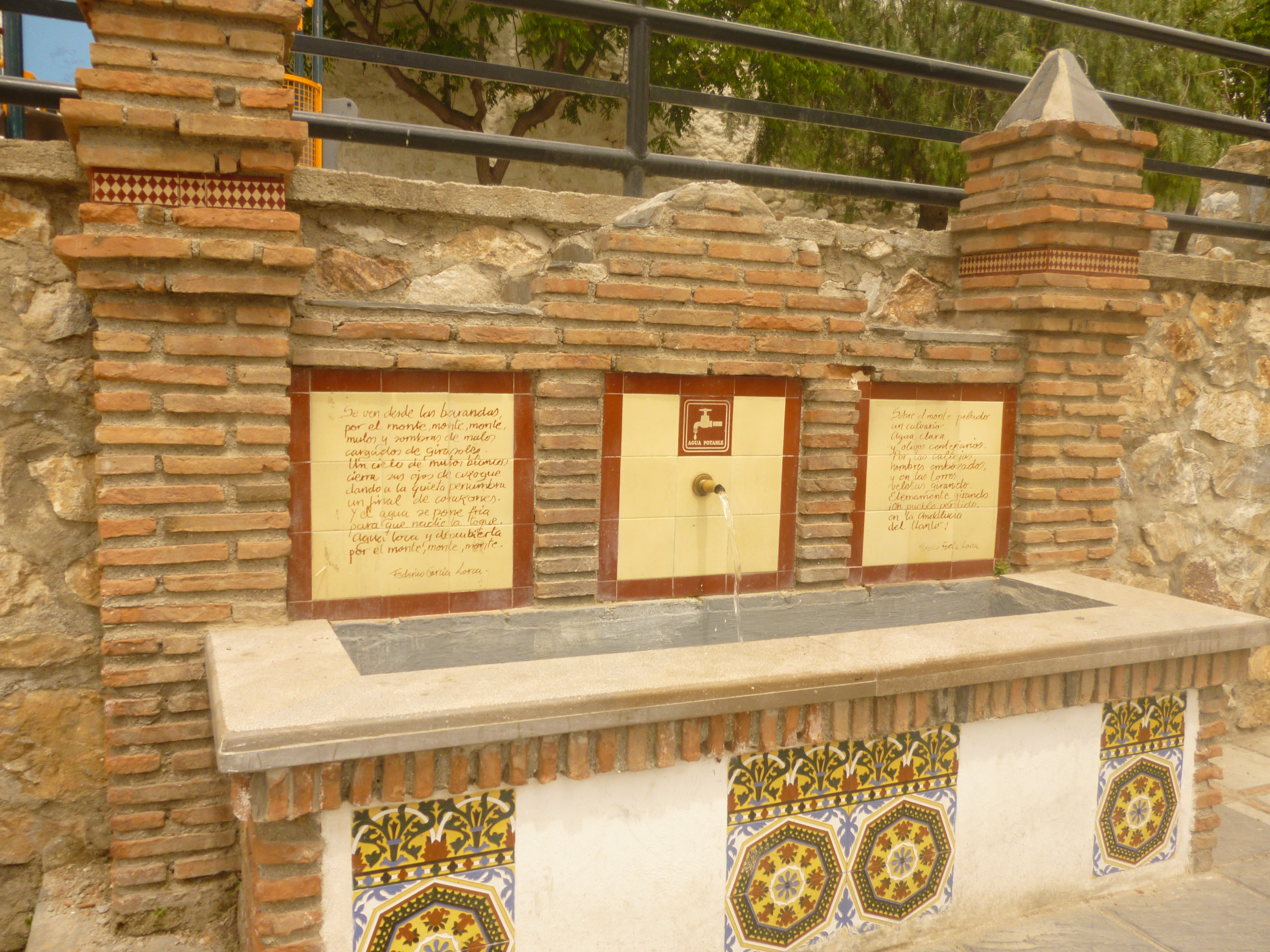

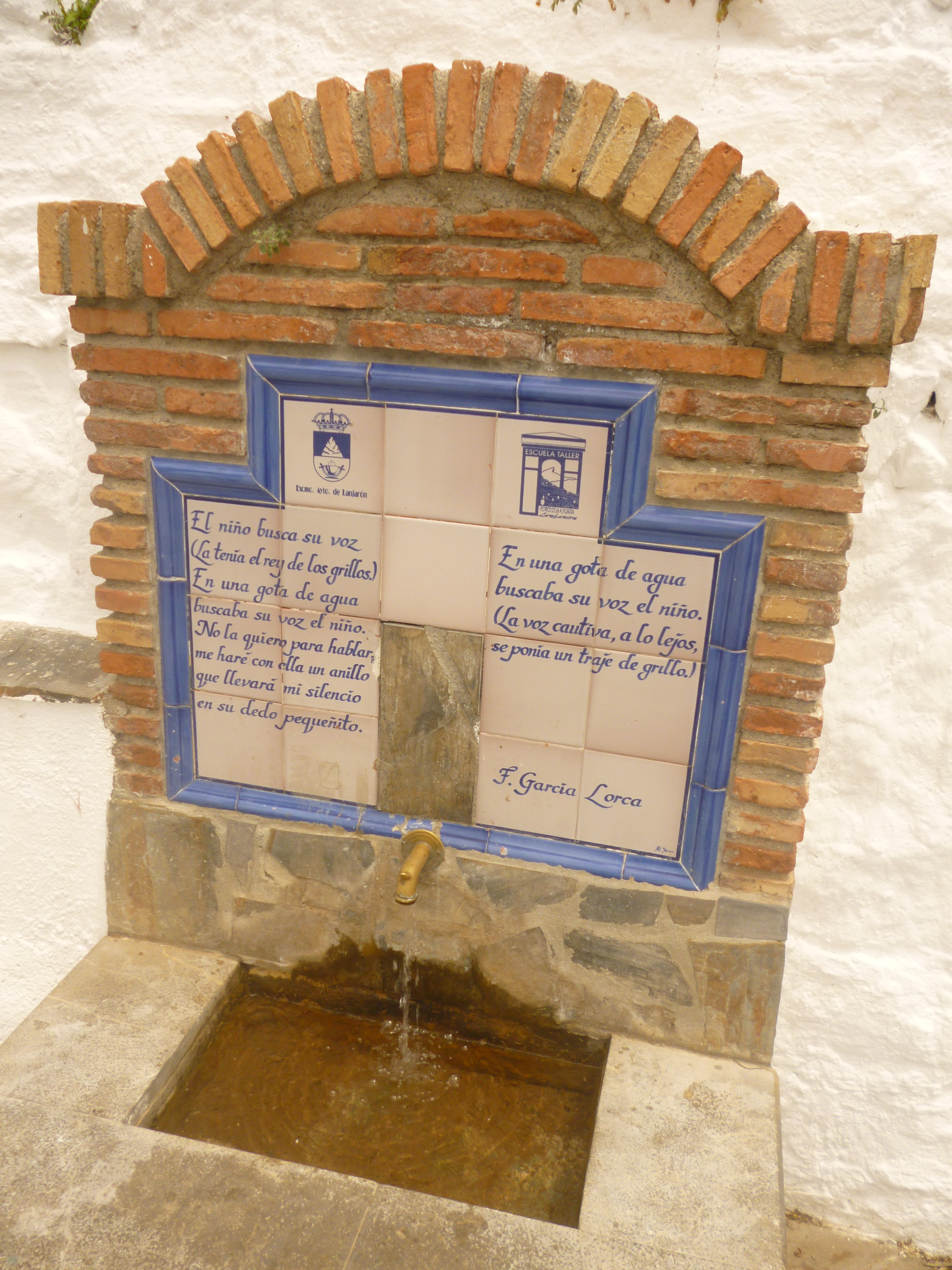

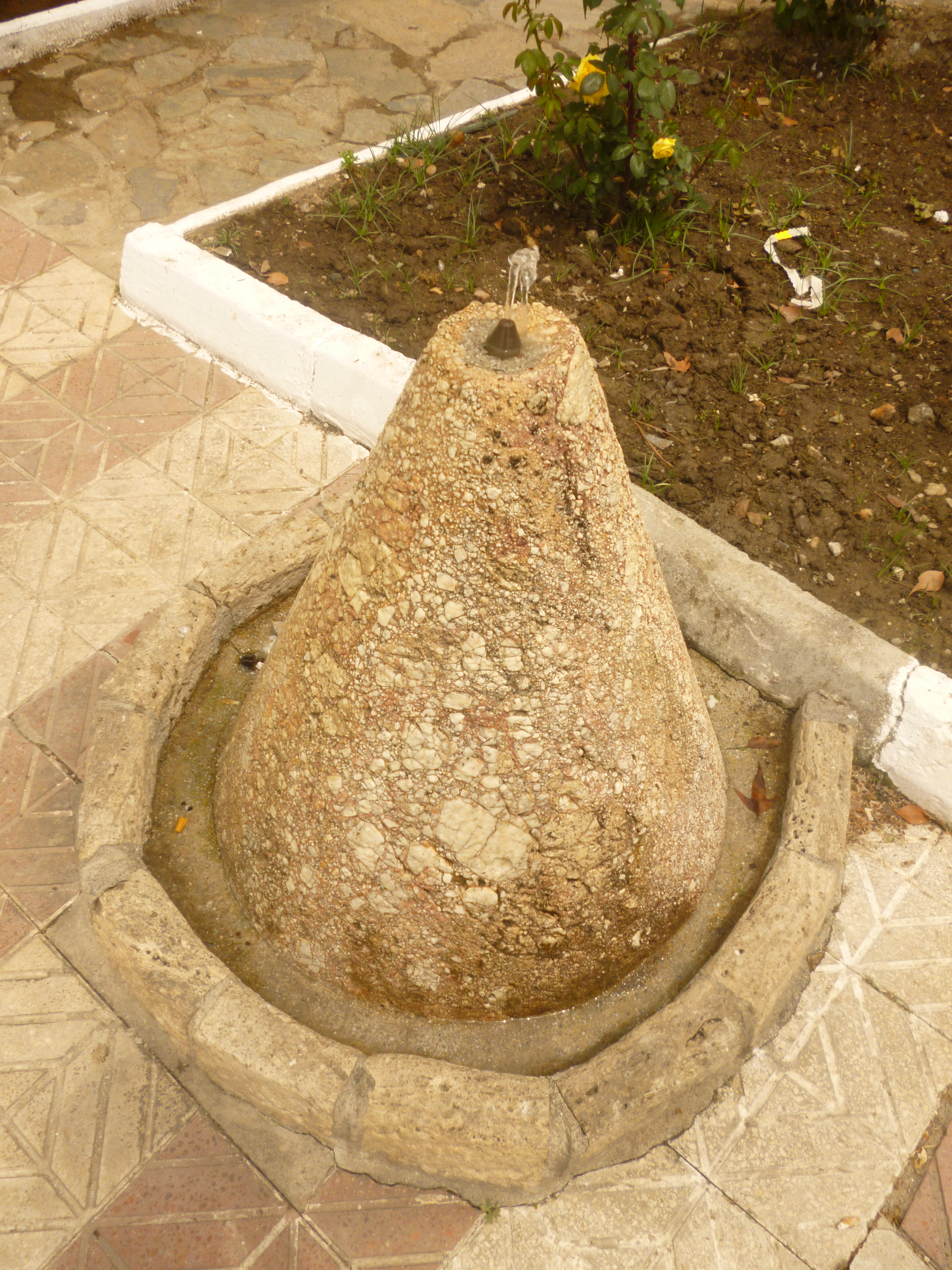

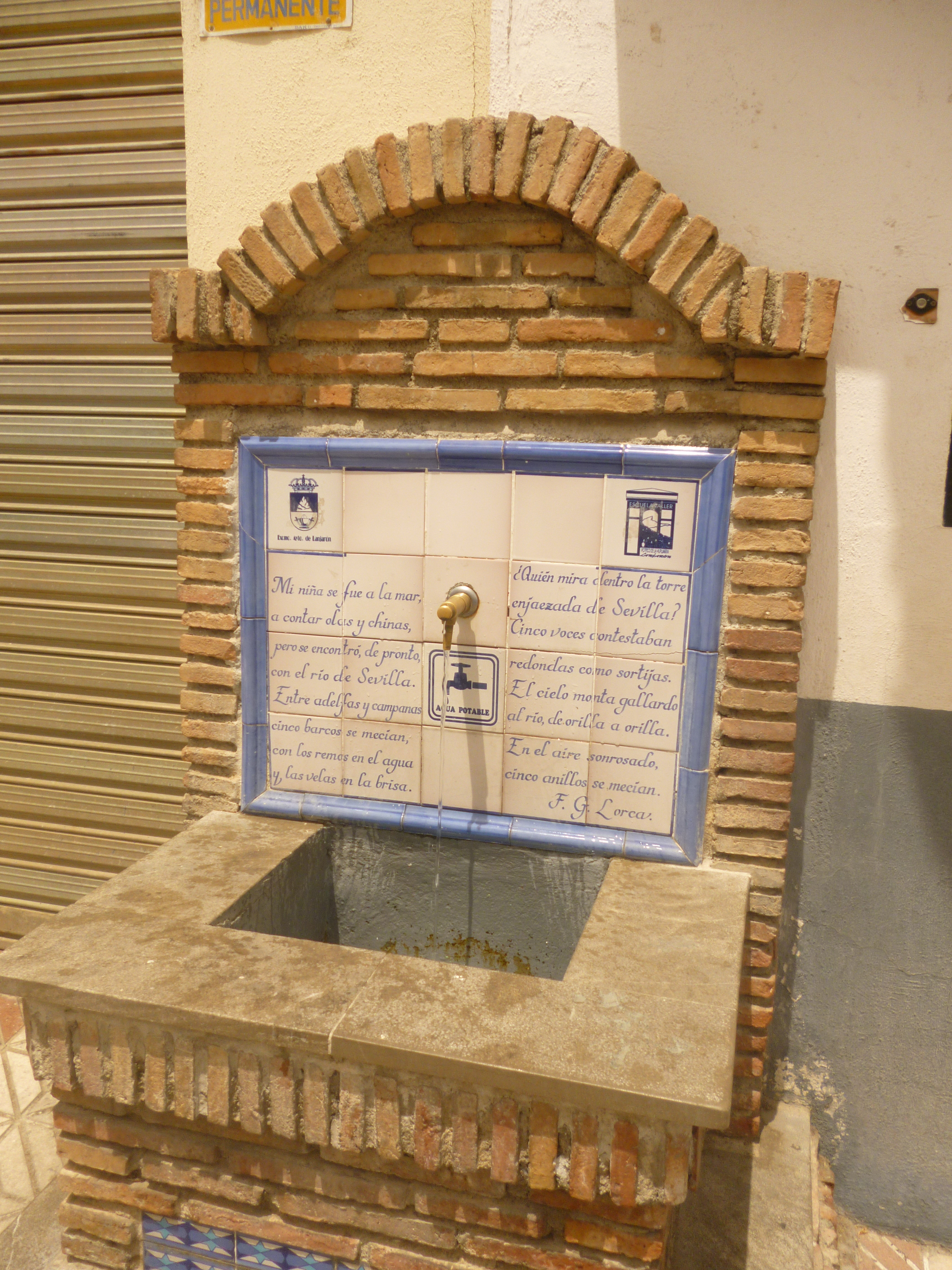

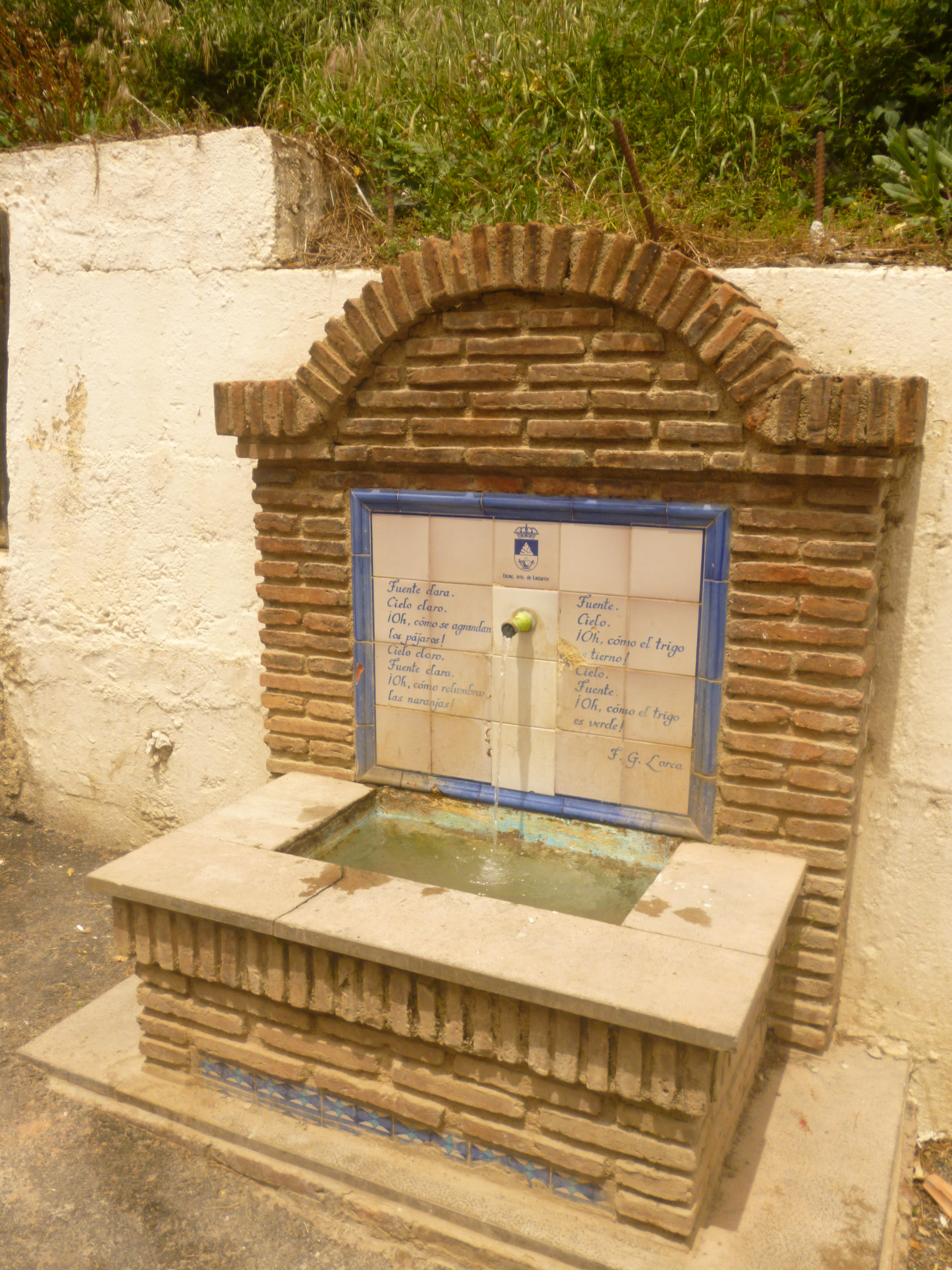

== See also ==
- List of municipalities in Granada
