= Busquístar =

Coordinates: 36°56′N 3°18′W

Busquístar, Spain
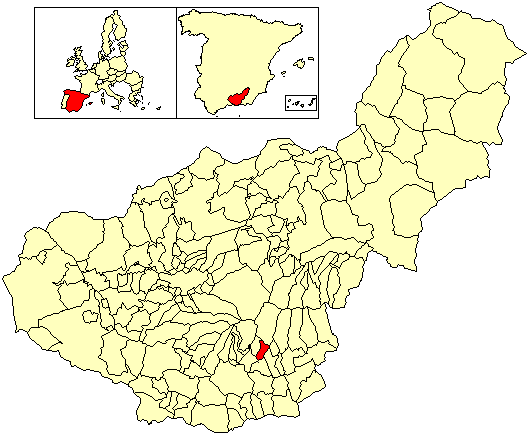
- Location of Busquístar
- Country: Spain
- Province: Granada
- Municipality: Busquístar

Area
  - Total: 18 km^{2} (6.9 sq mi)
- Elevation: 1,100 m (3,600 ft)

Population (2025-01-01)
  - Total: 313
  - Density: 17/km^{2} (45/sq mi)
- Time zone: UTC+1 (CET)
  - Summer (DST): UTC+2 (CEST)

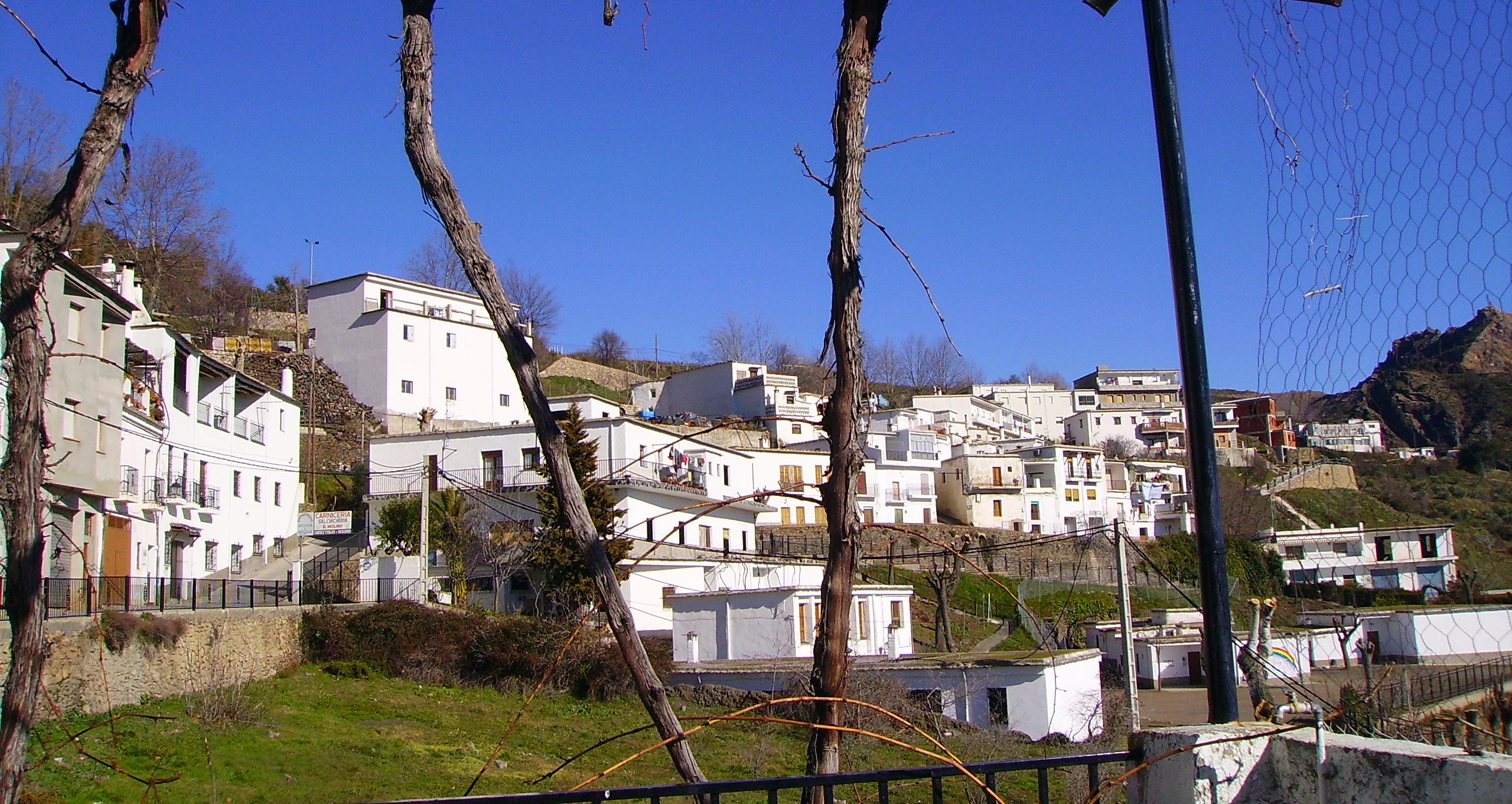
Busquístar (2009)

Busquístar is a small community located in the province of Granada, Spain. It is located in a region called The Alpujarras. According to the 2013 census (INE), the city has a population of 265 inhabitants.

== See also ==
- List of municipalities in Granada
