= Romani cuisine =

Culinary traditions of the Romani

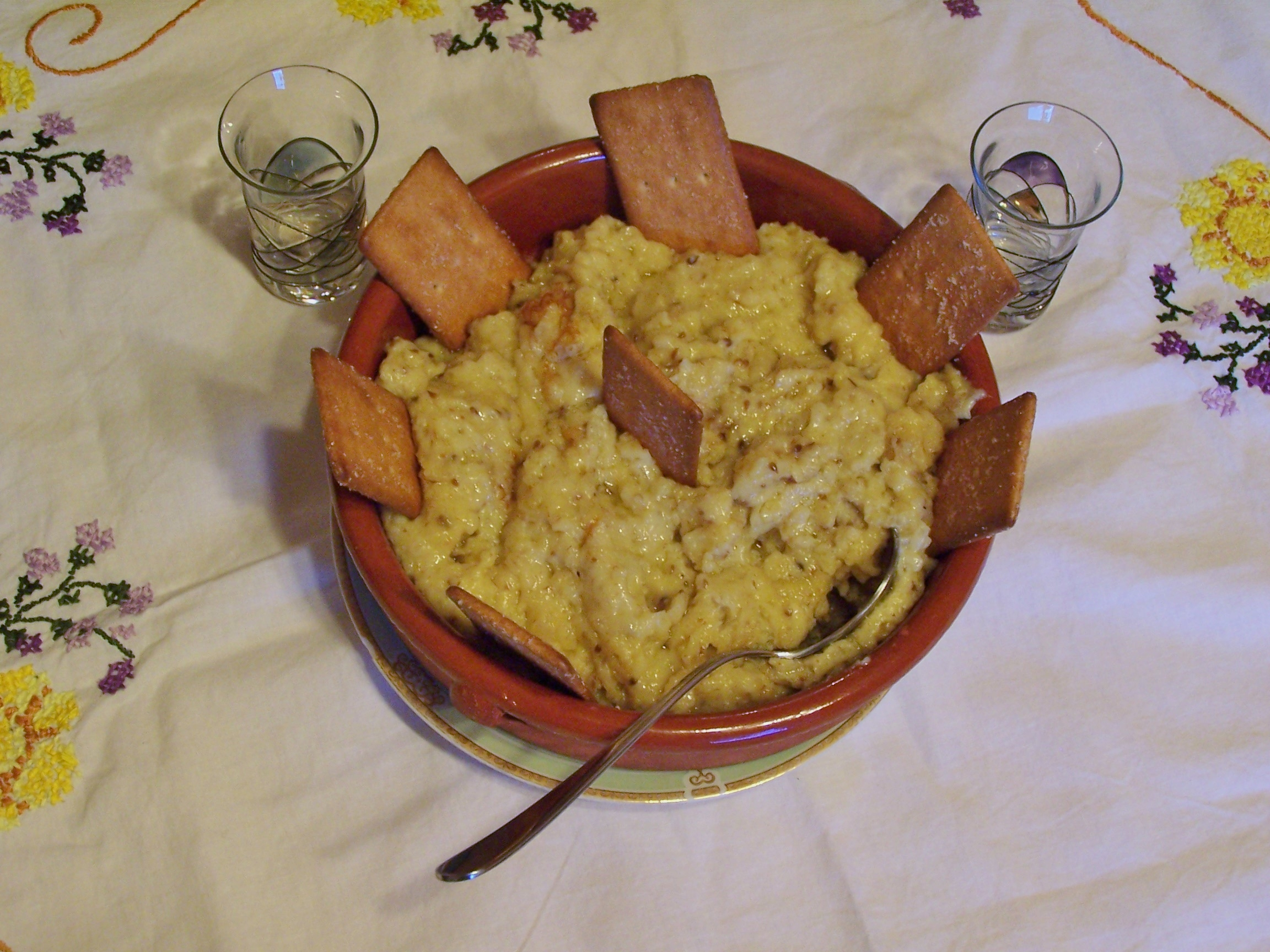
Gachas

Romani cuisine (Romani: Romano xabe) is diverse, reflecting the culinary traditions of the respective countries in which Romani people have lived for generations. However, distinctive recipes have emerged within Romani populations over time. In Southeastern Europe, Romani cuisine is part of the broader Balkan culinary tradition, with profound Ottoman Turkish influence. Stuffed cabbage and stuffed peppers are widely prepared. In Romania, cornmeal is a frequent dish. Ian Hancock dubbed Romani cuisine the “soul food of Europe”.

Some Roma hold that certain foods are auspicious, or lucky (baxtalo), especially foods with pungent tastes such as garlic, lemon, tomato, and peppers, and fermented foods such as sauerkraut, pickles and sour cream. Hedgehogs were historically a delicacy among some Romanis. Traditionally, many Romani would avoid eating food prepared by non-Romani. Tea is widely enjoyed, prepared with peaches and strawberries. Frybread is another favored dish. Romani dishes may retain influences from their historically nomadic lifestyle.

== Overview ==
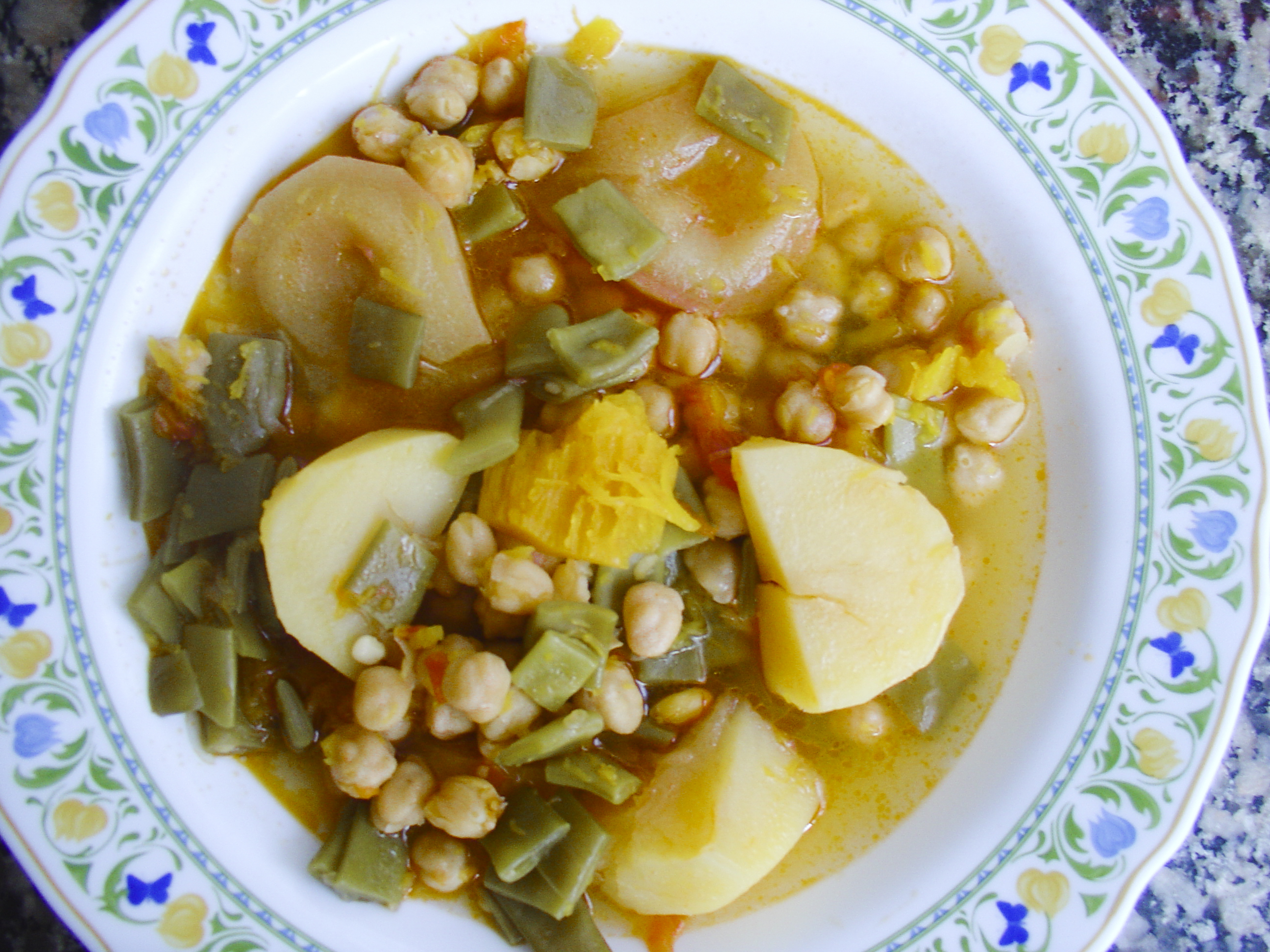
A plate of Olla Gitana, a savory fruit and vegetable stew eaten by Romani people in Andalusia.

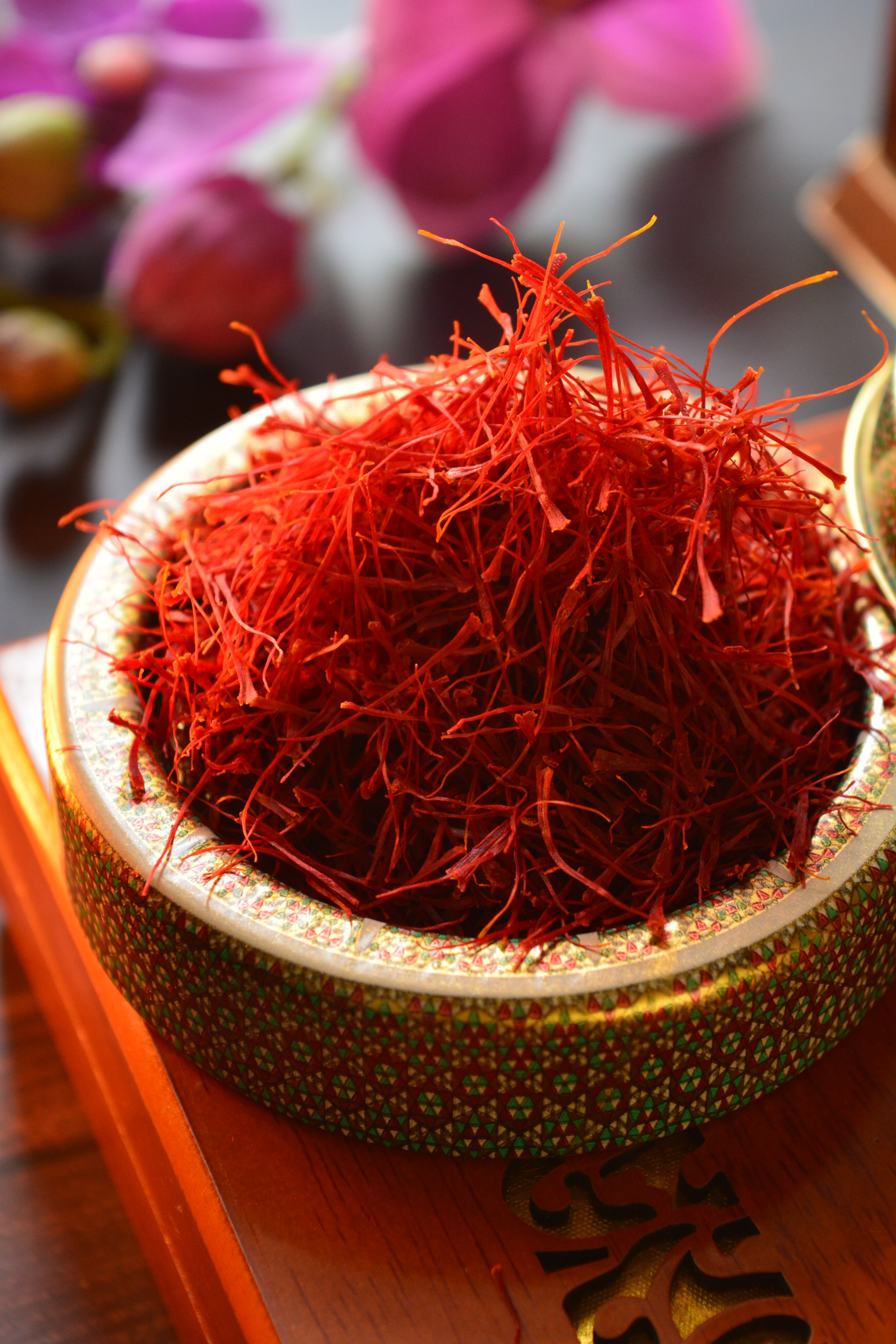
In Spain, the Romani people frequently use saffron to season their dishes.

The food traditionally cooked by Romanis is varied. The use of paprika, garlic and bell peppers is common amongst Romani in the Balkans. Stews are common amongst Romani throughout Europe. Potatoes are also a staple in their diet. Another traditional dish amongst Romani people is sarma, salmaia or sodmay (cabbage stuffed with meat and rice). Some Romani consume stuffed peppers, especially on holidays and special occasions. Romani may also cook pufe (made from fried flour), xaritsa (fried cornbread), bogacha (baked bread) and xaimoko (a meal consisting of rabbit meat). They serve their meals with kafa (coffee) and chao (tea) with sugar and milk or fruits such as strawberries, peach slices, apple slices, or lemon. There are a variety of soups in Romani cuisine. Fusui eski zumi is a Romani butter bean soup often made with ham. Pertia is a soup made with jellied pig's feet and pig's ears. There are a variety of stews in Romani cuisine, including a Romani rendition of chicken paprikash called puyo. Romani stews are often made with green and red peppers, tomatoes, potatoes, onions, garlic, and some meat. Whole meats, like spit-roasted pigs or lambs, or large hams, are often prepared for special occasions. At Romani feasts, sarmi, meats, sauces, celery sticks (often eaten by the Roma for virility), salads, pirogo, saviako, and a stew or two may be served.

Romani food may be cooked outdoors in cauldrons atop a wooden flame. Traditionally, bread formed a part of any meal. Romani cuisine is also, often out of necessity, inexpensive to prepare and centers portable ingredients. Potatoes, peppers, cabbage and rice are often the building blocks in Romani cuisine. Chicken and lamb are common proteins, while goat, game meat (such as rabbit) and wild birds (such as quails and partridge) were historically common. Rabbit stew is made with rabbit meat, innards, bacon and onions. Romani people may also consume roasted apples, almond cakes, rabbit stew, clay-baked hedgehog and trout, pig stomach, and fig cakes. Baked hedgehog is flavored with garlic, and is called hotchi-witchi or niglo, in Romani. To prepare the dish, the hedgehog is wrapped in clay and placed on white-hot stones. When the roasting is done, the quills attached to the clay are pulled off and the hedgehog dish is served wrapped in leaves. Romanichals traditionally cooked with chitty irons.

Turkish Roma frequently prepare chicken and eggs using their own recipe for it, which is well known in Turkey.

Cornmeal is a staple for the Kalderash. Romani slaves were fed cornmeal during slavery in Romania. Romani people also make an unleavened bread using cornmeal mush called ankrusté flavored with cumin and coriander.

Coffee is a prized drink among Romani people. Wild fruit, berries, leafy plants and small animals formed the bulk of Romani people's diet. Some Roma prepare Turkish coffee. Nettle tea and dandelion coffee are also popular Romani beverages.

Traditional fish-based feast on Saint Nicholas Day, as celebrated by a Roma family in Sofia, Bulgaria

Eggplants are cooked in tomato sauce. The Roma pickle gherkins, cabbage, beets, ripe olives and a cabbage-cauliflower mixture. The Roma also cook pogača bread. Romani people prepare borscht with beets, cabbage, bay leaves and soup bones. It is often served with sour cream and extra vegetables.

There are records of nomadic Romani people picking mushrooms and berries from forests and collecting young nettles in the spring.

Since their migration from South Asia through Armenia, the Romani people have acquired extensive knowledge about the nutritional and medicinal properties of various natural ingredients. They have mastered the art of utilizing berries, nettles, beech leaves, and herbs in their cuisine. Living near the sea, they also gather limpets and mussels to supplement their grocery purchases, which are often funded by horse trading. In their quest for flavorful meat, the Romani people prefer geese, goats, pork, and wild salmon over beef and mutton. They have a stock of dried mushrooms that add a distinct flavor to their ragouts, while dandelion roots serve as a strong ingredient for their coffee, which is further enhanced with wild honey.

The Romani people value recipes that incorporate ingredients such as butter and eggs from free-range hens, molasses, unrefined sugar, and wholemeal flour. In their cooking, they believe in using generous amounts of bread, garlic, pepper, salt, and vinegar for good luck. They also engage in hunting and gathering activities, collecting dulse, eels, sea kale, game, seabird offal, gooseberries, and mulberries to create flavorful soups and boiled puddings. A beloved recipe among children involves hollowing out a potato and filling it with elderberry jam before baking it in embers.

Romani cuisine in Spain is characterized by being simple, nutritious, colorful, and spicy. Some of the most common dishes are stews, prepared in a multitude of variations (with beans and fennel, cod, etc.), gachas, flamenquines (stuffed and fried pork rolls), and so on. Gitanos use chickpeas and saffron. La Cocina Gitana de Matilde Amaya is a Romani cookbook released in 2002.

Joe Grey or Joey Grey is a traditional Romani stew in Britain that can be made with most meats; usually rabbit meat but also eels. Other dishes traditional to Romanis in Britain are bacon pudding, rabbit pie, plum pudding (made using dried plums), and jam roly-poly pudding. The Romani method of cooking bacon pudding is by wrapping in a muslin cloth or tin foil, and boiling. It is served with gravy or parsley sauce.

In their traditional nomadic lifestyle, the Romani people consume specific delicacies, influenced by a taboo system. In Poland, chicken has been the preferred dish among the Roma, although they also relish hedgehogs and mushrooms. Romani in England tend to opt for packaged food during their shopping trips, as it appears less likely to have been contaminated or poisoned by non-Romani people (Gadje). In Czechoslovakia, the cuisine of most Romani families can be classified as a variant of Slovak or occasionally Hungarian cooking. However, it is noted that the majority of their meals are either boiled or served cold; methods such as baking and frying are infrequent and have only begun to gain popularity in recent times. The most common and favored dishes include boiled meats, particularly pork (balano mas), potatoes (phaba, gruli, or bandurky), and various types of 'non-powder' soups (zumin). Additionally, many families consume spatzle, cabbage, pig's blood, inexpensive salami, or their traditional Gypsy food (goja, stuffed intestines). Historically, some Romani people consumed hedgehog, with some appealed by the thought that it spikes provide protection against contamination.

Tyúkos káposzta is a Romani dish in Hungary made with sauerkraut and hen meat. Cigánytokány is made with pork and beans. Bodag is a Romani flatbread that is often served with stuffed cabbage and lecsó. Romani recipes are characterized by skillfully blending and mixing the gastronomy of other ethnic groups, yet their unique flavor is recognizable. Popular and traditional Romani dishes do not have a strict recipe, the list of ingredients can vary depending on what is customary, what is popular, and what they were able to obtain in a particular family. Besides lecsó, bodag is one of the most well-known Romani dishes in Hungary. In some places it is also called vakáro, vakarcs or Gypsy bread. Bodag is a relative of the Indian naan, the Latin American tortilla or the Turkish pita. There is a very simple version, which only contains flour, salt, baking soda and water. Bodag can be spiced up but it is usually eaten with stews and juicy dishes. Another well-known Romani dish in Hungary is kakaspörkölt. Romani stews are made from any meat, including chicken, pork or groundhog meat. Sah hai mas is a Romani stew made with pork, cabbage and rice.

A popular dish among the Sinti is kleese, which is sauerkraut with chicken.

Historically, some Romani people would occasionally eat the meat of animals that died a natural death.

=== Desserts ===
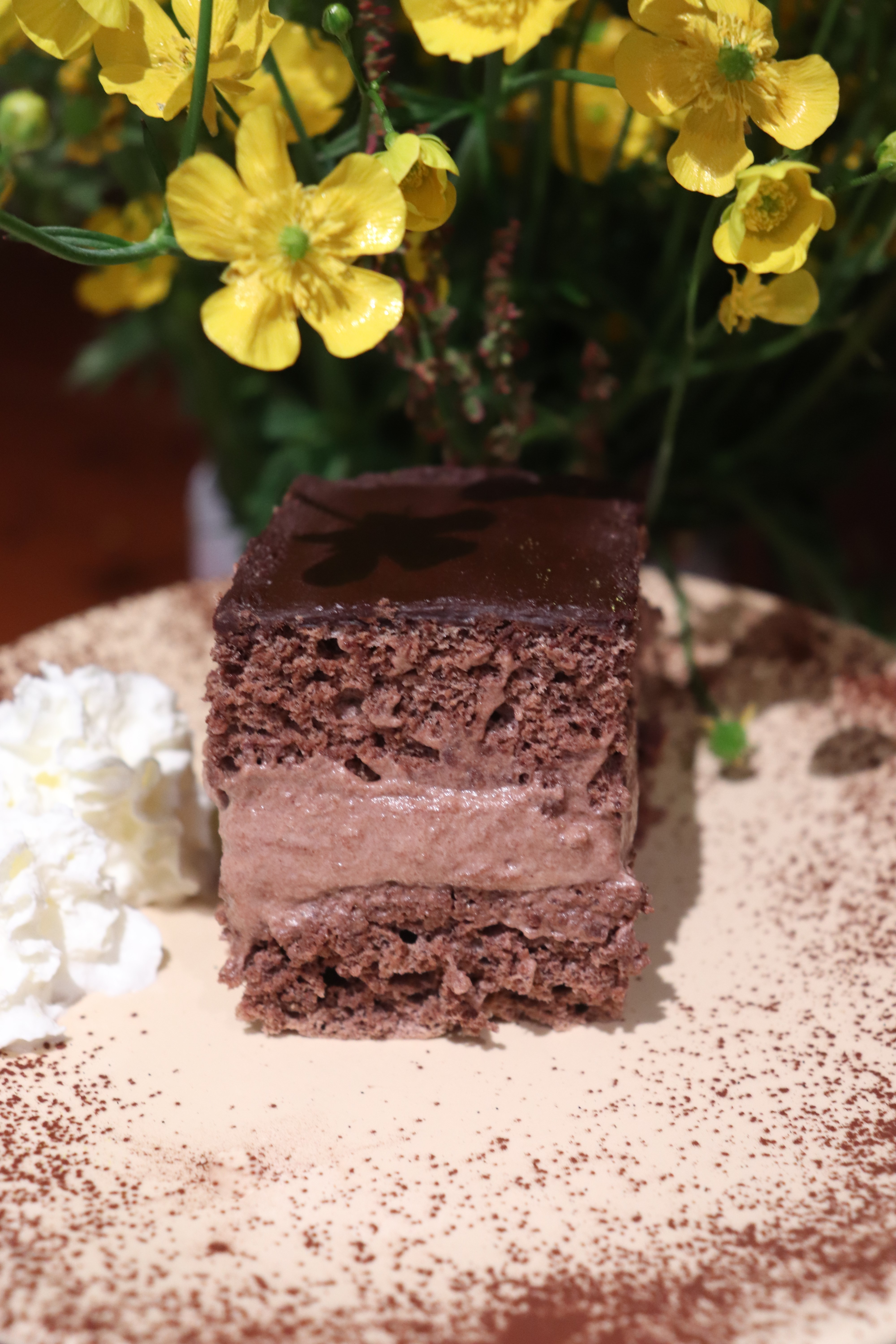
Rigójancsi is a pastry made with chocolate sponge cake and chocolate cream. It is named for Rigó Jancsi, a celebrated Hungarian Romani violinist.

A traditional Romani dessert is pirogo, which is similar to Jewish kugel. The recipe consists of eggs, raisins, walnuts, pineapple, sugar, butter, egg noodles and cottage cheese.

Szaloncukor is a Romani dessert that is mixed flour and sugar. The dough is made into shapes like sugar cookies, then they are baked, wrapped, and hung on a tree until January 6 for the feast of the Epiphany.

The Roma also have own version of wheat pudding for Christmas. After husking wheat, soaking the berries in water, warming them in an oven, and smashing the soft hulls with tools that were available, Romani cooks put the pudding through a sieve, then mix the remaining gelatinous substance with milk, flour, and eggs, and sweeten it with honey, sugar, or molasses. The Roma also add dried fruits, cream, butter and homemade rum or brandy to the pudding. Romani bakers place a token of good luck, which is often a silver coin, in a loaf of sweet Christmas bread or cake. Romani tradition has it that whoever gets the coin in their piece will have a good year. The dough for the cake is similar to the Balkan kozunak.

Romani people also have their own version of poppy seed moon cake.

Plum dumplings are made from the dough of mashed potatoes, eggs, butter and salt, rolled out and cut into small circles. The cook carefully places a plum, topped with cinnamon and sugar, on the dough just before the dumplings are folded, sealed and boiled in salt water. After cooking, the discs are rolled in buttered breadcrumbs and sprinkled with more cinnamon and sugar. They may also transform potatoes, cherries, and dried bread into desserts and treats.

=== Food beliefs ===
Some Romanis believe that certain foods are auspicious and give luck (baxt), similar to the Rajputs. Some Romanis in America believe red pepper, black pepper, salt, vinegar, garlic, onions and a sacrificed animal such as lamb to be lucky foods. Fermented foods such as sauerkraut, pickles and sour cream are also considered lucky in Romani cuisine.

Romani food beliefs are rooted in the Ayurveda concept of ritual purity and ritual pollution. Serving peanuts is forbidden by Romani people at pomana feasts and greens (zelenimata) cannot be eaten by Roma in mourning or when expecting a baby or breastfeeding, likely because they can induce colic. Some Romani believe celery promotes virility.

Certain foods may traditionally be considered marime (ritually unclean) and therefore are avoided. Horse, cat, and dog meat are forbidden. Frog meat and snake meat are considered unlucky by Christian Roma and are associated with the Devil. Peacock meat is forbidden. Christian Roma associate peacocks with the evil eye. Christian Roma tend to not eat at restaurants and avoid food prepared by non-Roma. A Romani woman menstruating cannot cook or serve food to men.

=== Restaurants ===
Although many Hungarian restaurants tend to feature Romani musicians, there is only one Romani restaurant in Hungary, called Romani Platni ("Roma Stove") which opened in Budapest in 2012. In Maribor, Slovenia, there is a Romani restaurant called Romani Kafenava. Adam Andrasz was a Polish social activist and musician who opened a Romani restaurant called Ke Moro in Tarnów. In the town of Štrpce, Serbia, there is a Romani Kafana called Kod Cige (ENG: By the Gypsy)

== List of Romani dishes ==
- Ankruste - small baked cakes made from cornmeal, flavored with aromatic spices such as coriander and cuminseed.
- Saviako - a noodle and cottage cheese pudding that is baked.
- Gushvada - a cheese strudel
- Çingene Yumurtasi - eggs in Romani style from Turkey.
- Çingene Tavuğu - chicken in Romani style from Turkey.
- Shak te mas - meat and cabbage.
- Joe Grey - a stew popular among British Roma
- Bodag - a Hungarian Romani flatbread
- Vegyes Nyakleves - a Hungarian neck soup
- Bokoli or pogaca - wheat bread made with baking soda but no yeast, sometimes with crumbled fried bacon stirred into the dough before baking
- Boranija - a meat and green bean stew.
- Cignidaki zumi - a soup made with the leaves of the stinging nettle plant
- Djeveli - omelette made from chicken eggs or eggs of game birds
- Djuveci - a curry-like fish stew
- Galuski - small dumplings made from flour and water, flavoured with almonds and boiled in milk
- Gembeci - dumplings made with flour and suet then stuffed with fried meat
- Guvara - strudel made of cooked fruit folded or layered in pastry
- Hočiwiči or Niglo - hedgehog, was historically popular among Romanis in France and the United Kingdom, but also eaten by other Romani subgroups.
- Jaxnija - a thick minced meat and red bean soup
- Manrro la smetanasa - piece of bread spread with sour cream and stewed fruit
- Muterdo Sax - the dandelion plant; its leaves are used as a green vegetable and its root may be dried, scorched and ground up to make a coffee-like drink
- Peržala - eggs scrambled with bits of fried meat or with herbs
- Pirožna makoske semincjansa - a small cake filled with poppy-seed paste.
- Poovengur drey a koori- a Romanichals dish, which is a potato, scrubbed and hollowed out, filled with jam and baked in a tin can with the lid tightly on, in the ashes.
- Pufe - fried dough similar to Native American frybread.
- Rrunza - a dish made with a pig's stomach lining, cut into small pieces and stewed for several hours with peppers, tomatoes and onions, and flavored with salt, vinegar and lemon juice.
- Romano Cajo - Romani tea drunk in a glass with peaches or strawberries in it.
- Sarma - stuffed cabbage.
- Sonko fusujansa - a tomato-based casserole of ham chunks and butter beans.
- Sax suklo - a cabbage-based casserole made with chicken or pork. It is seasoned with pepper and vinegar.
- Xevica or mamaliga - a porridge made from boiled cornmeal. It was the main staple of Romanian Roma slaves and still commonly eaten in Romania.
- Gachas de matalauva - a sweet gruel made from olive oil, garlic, paprika, salt, and anise. It is considered part of Andalusian Romani cuisine.

== Gallery ==
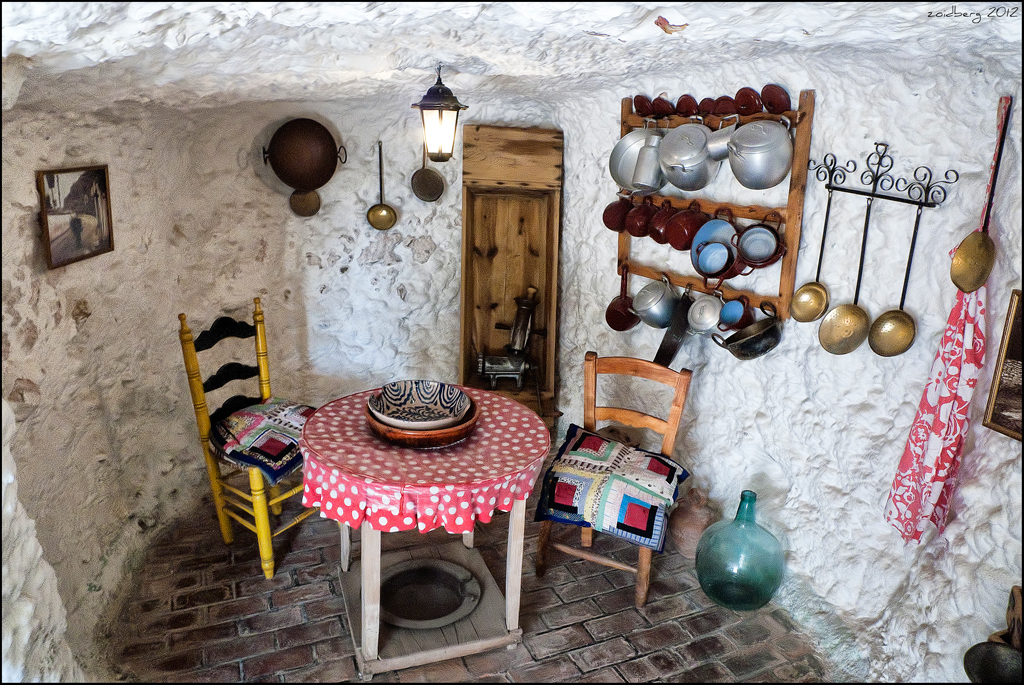

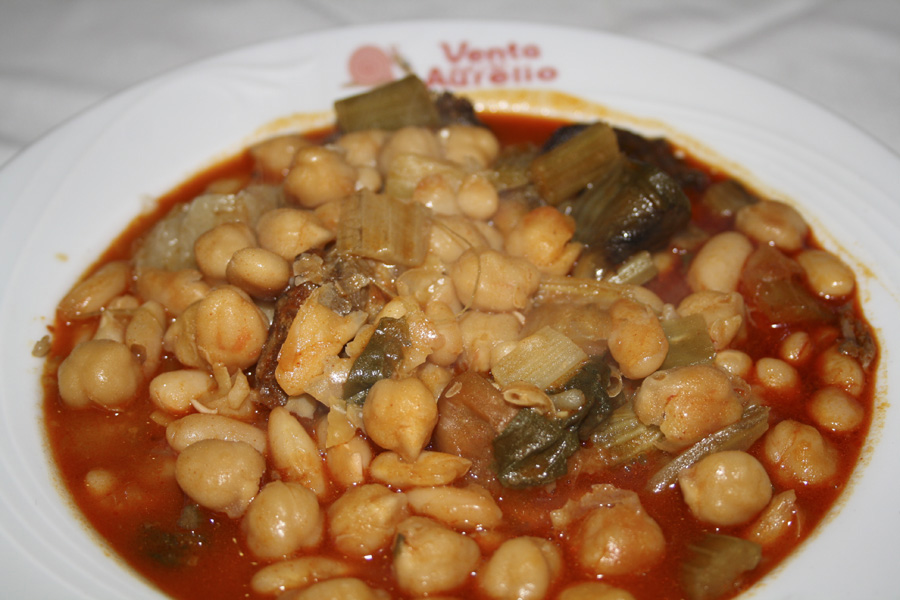

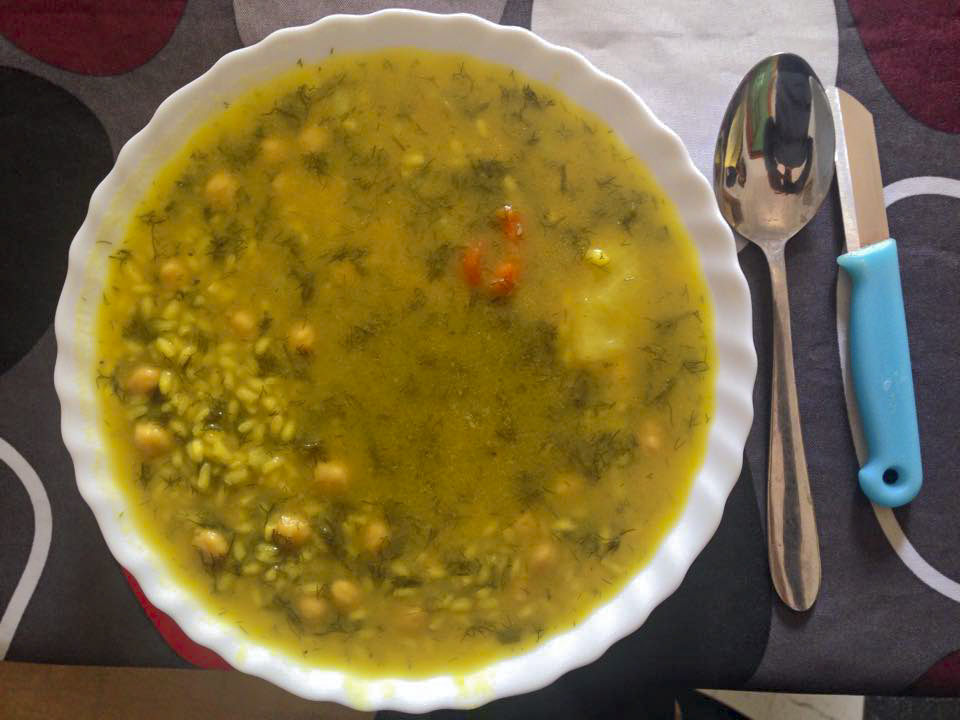

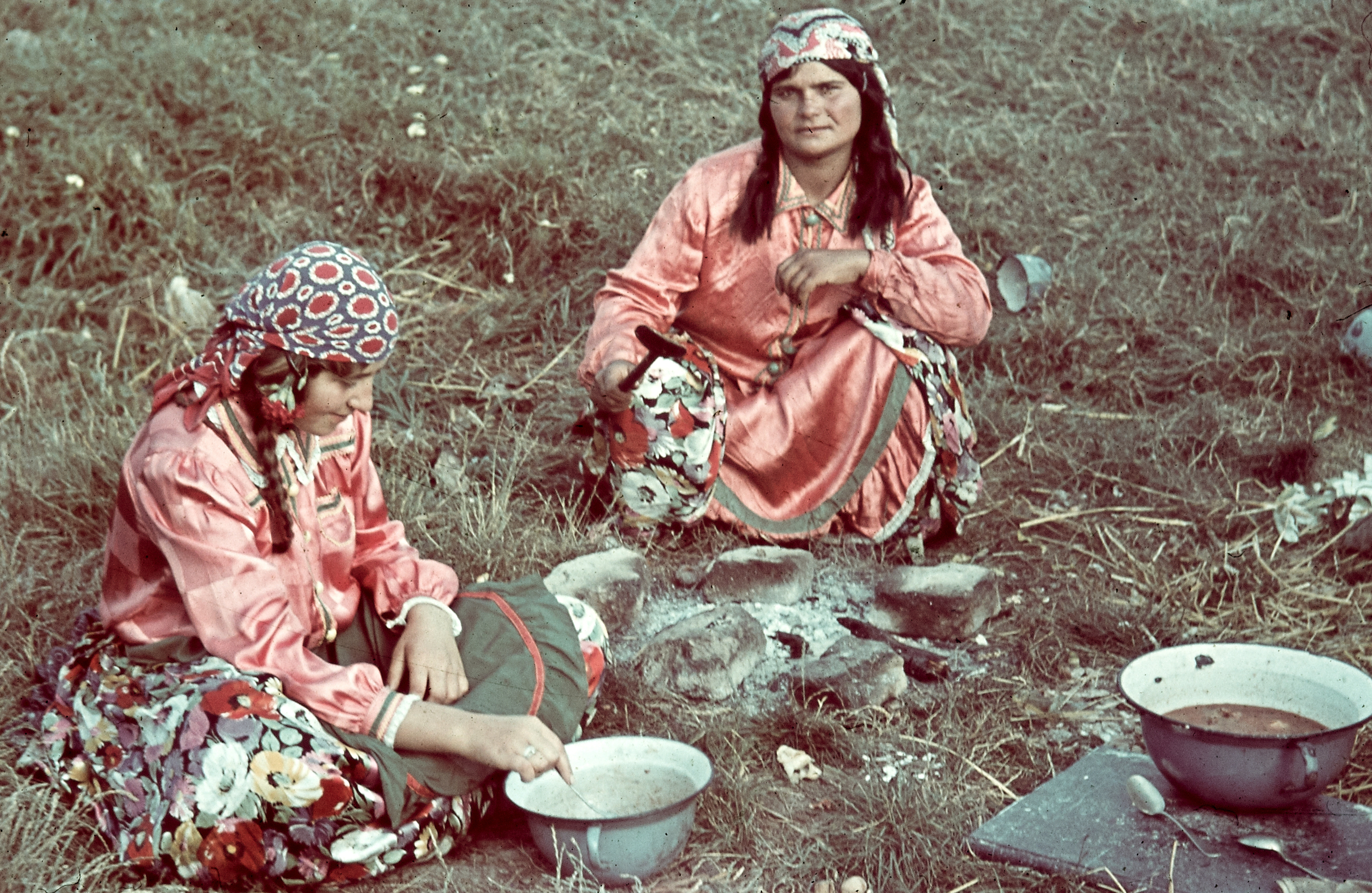

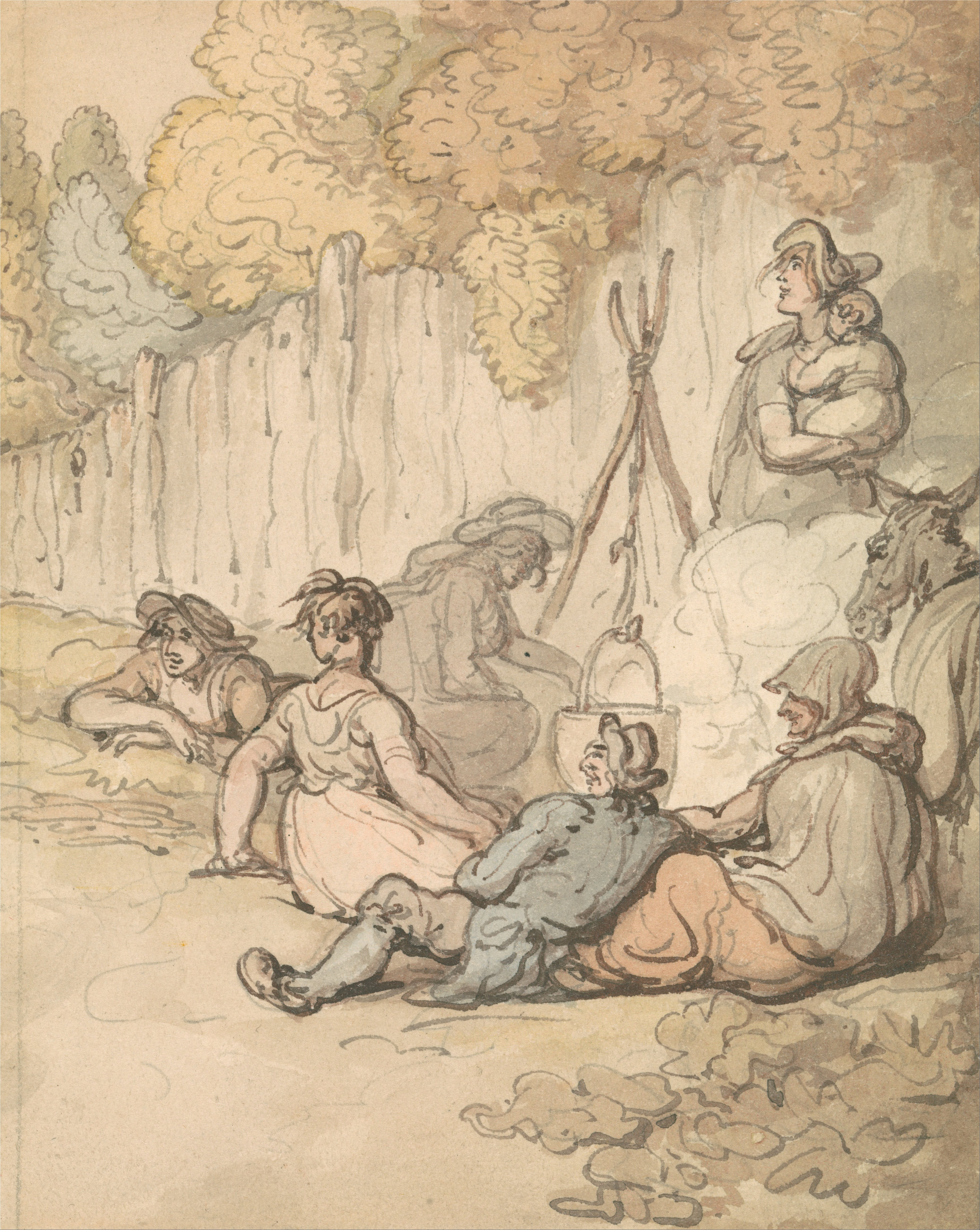

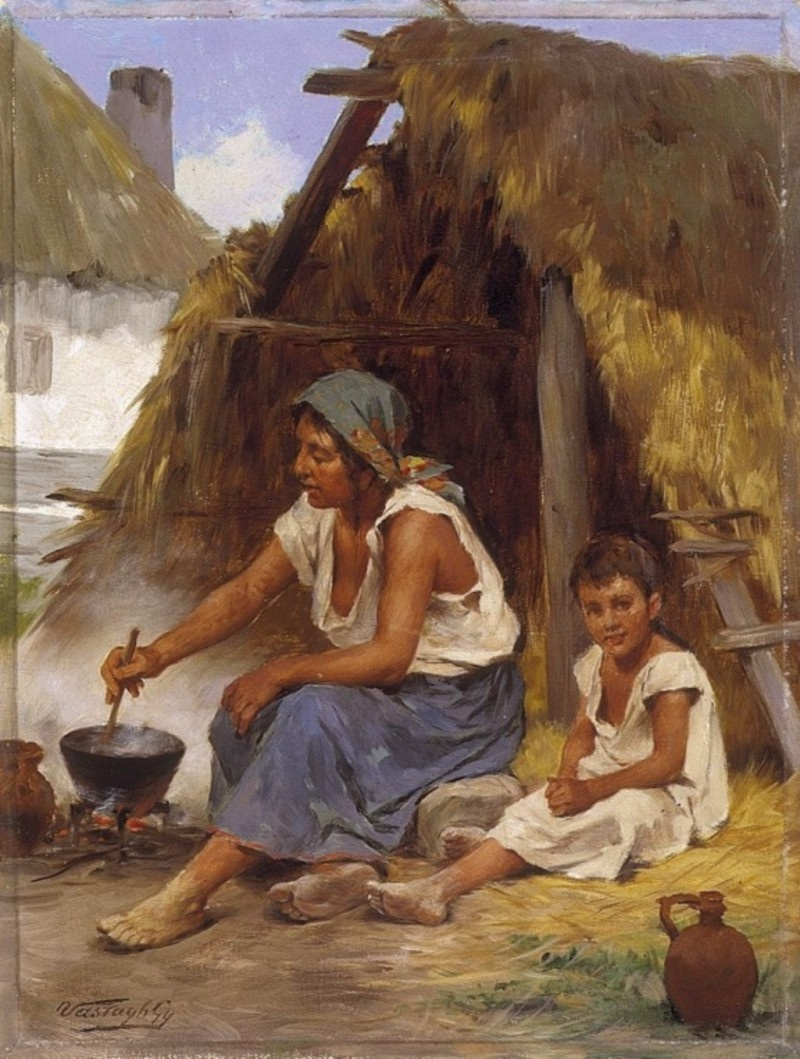

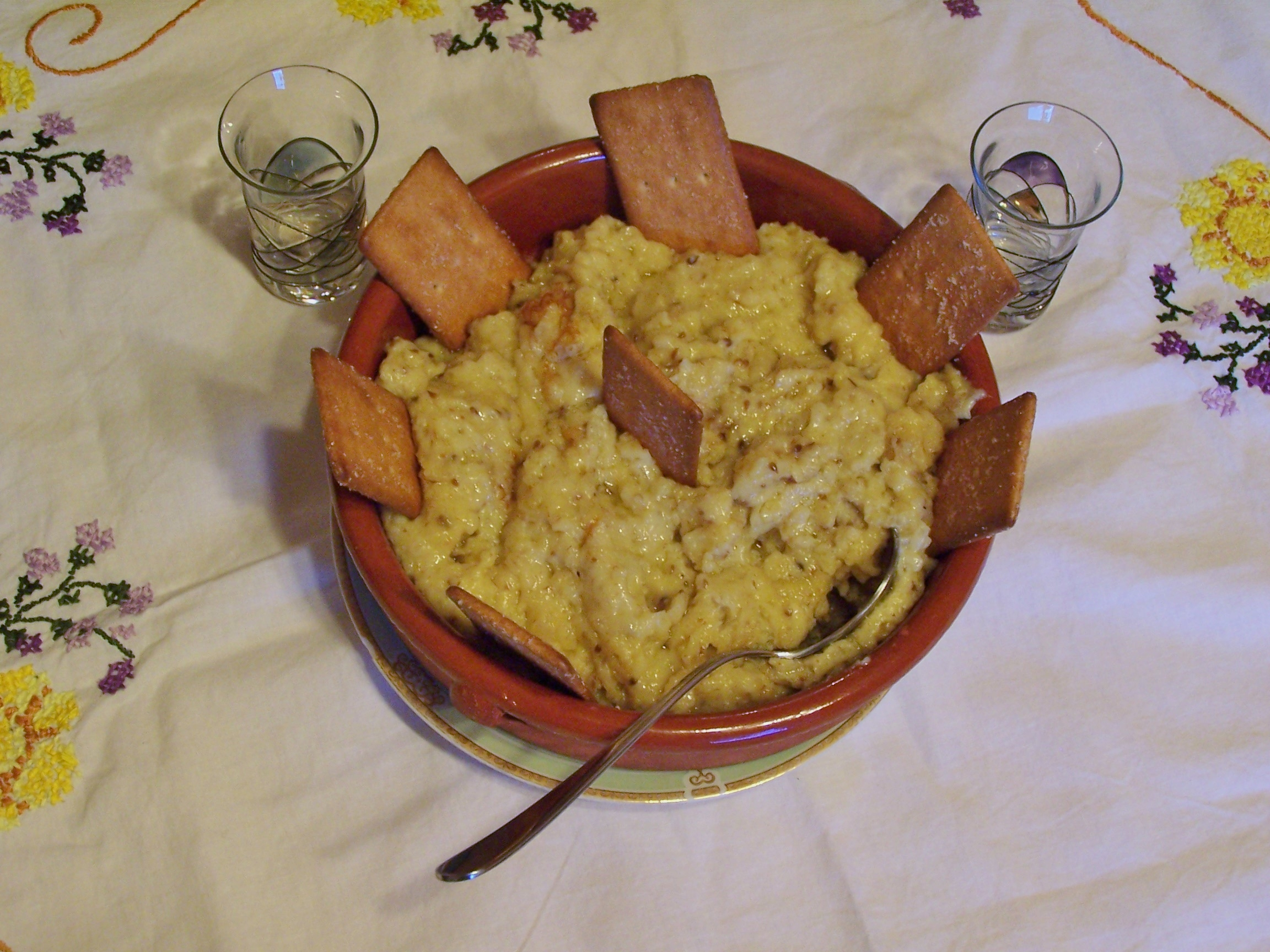

== See also ==
- Romani society and culture
