= Andalusian cuisine =

Cuisine of Andalusia, Spain

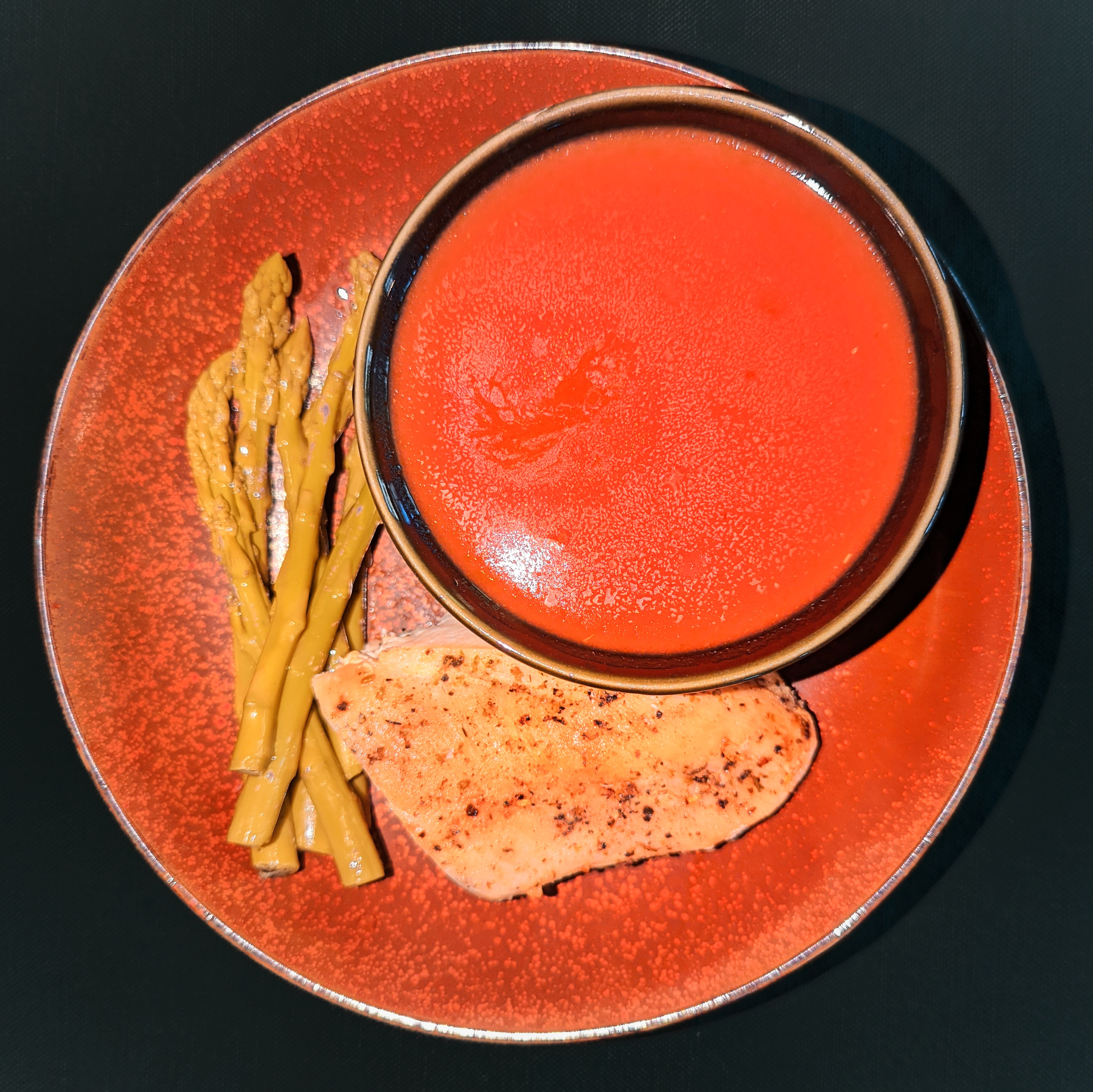
Gazpacho

Andalusian cuisine is the regional cuisine of Andalusia, Spain. Notable dishes include gazpacho, fried fish (often called pescaíto frito in the local vernacular), the jamones of Jabugo, Valle de los Pedroches and Trevélez, and the wines of Jerez, particularly sherry. Culinary influences come from the historic Christian, Muslim, and Jewish traditions of the region. The oldest known cookbook of Andalusian cuisine, Kitab al tabij fi-l-Maghrib wa-l-Andalus fi `asr al-Muwahhidin, li-mu'allif mayhul, dates from the 13th century.

== Fried foods ==
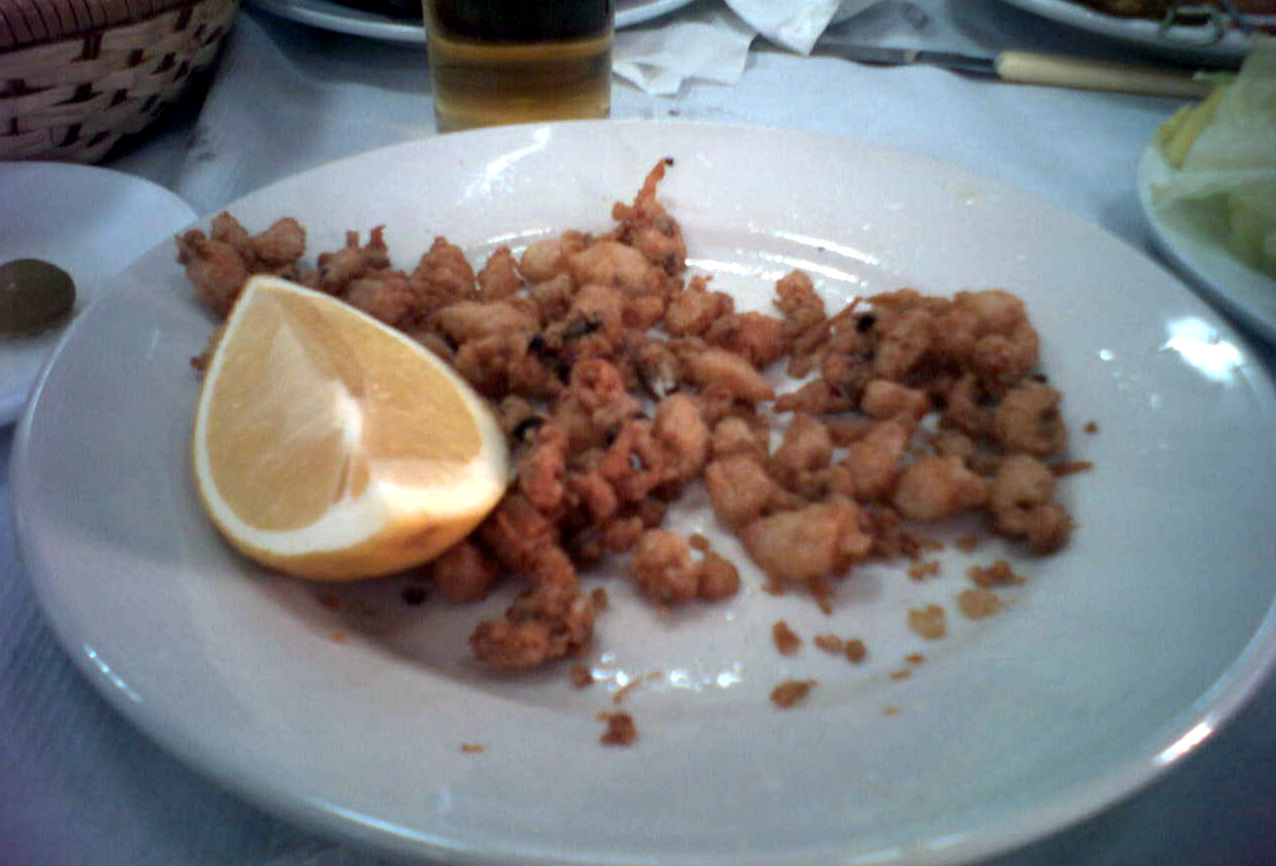
Puntillitas, battered and fried baby squid

Frying in Andalusian cuisine is dominated by the use of olive oil, produced mainly in the provinces of Jaén, Córdoba, Seville, and Granada. Málaga, Almería, Cádiz and Huelva produce olive oil too, but in smaller amounts. The foods are dredged in flour a la Andaluza (meaning only flour, without egg or other ingredients, but may include flour from the chickpea especially for use in batters). They are then fried in a large quantity of hot olive oil.

== Fish and shellfish ==
Andalusia's coast has unique access to both the Atlantic Ocean and Mediterranean Sea. With five coastal provinces, the consumption of fish and shellfish is high: white shrimp from the Bay of Cádiz; prawns; murex; anchovies; baby squid; cuttlefish; "bocas de la Isla", a dish found in San Fernando that uses a local crab that can regenerate its claw; flounder; etc. Another important fish to the region is tuna which is caught during their Atlantic migration. Tuna can be used to make the traditional dish atún encebollado.

Andalusian cuisine includes also some less frequently seen seafood dishes, like ortiguillas, sea anemones in batter.

== Desserts ==
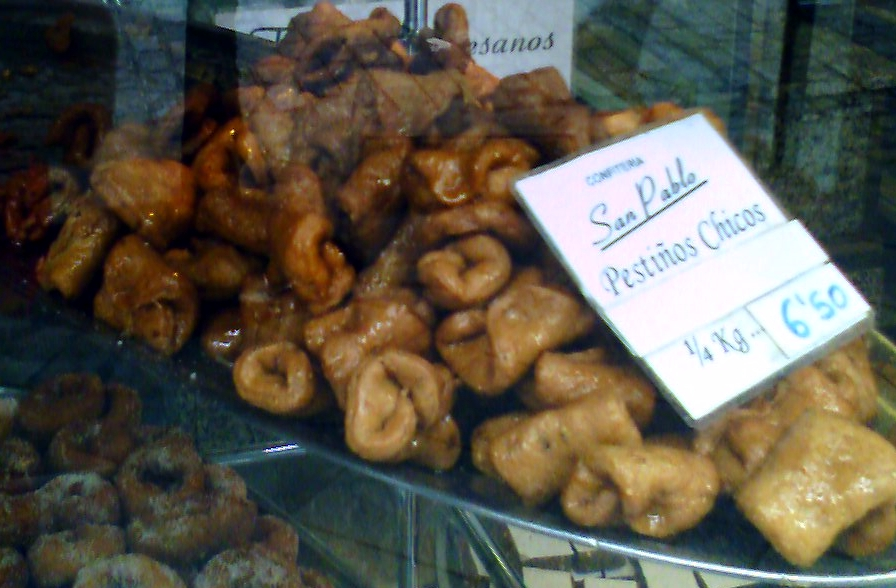
Pestiños de miel, a honey-coated sweet fritter

Sugar was first introduced to Andalusia by the Moors around the 10th-century and cultivated in Granada.

Andalusian desserts are heavily influenced by Arabic medieval Andalucian cuisine. Notable dishes include pestiños (a deep-fried pastry bathed in honey), amarguillo (a form of almond macaroon) from Medina Sidonia, polvorones (almond cookies of Estepa), lard bread, wine doughnuts, torrija and calentitos.

== Wines and liquors ==
The wines of Jerez (also known as sherry) are famous the world over, praised even by William Shakespeare. Other standouts are the manzanilla of Sanlúcar de Barrameda, the white wines of Cádiz, paxarete (a sherry derivative), wines of Condado in Huelva, wines of Montilla-Moriles in Córdoba, wines of Málaga, and la tintilla of Rota. The liquors of the region are also popular, included the anís made in Rute, and in Cazalla de la Sierra, and the rums from the Tropical Coast of Granada (Motril).

== Typical dishes ==
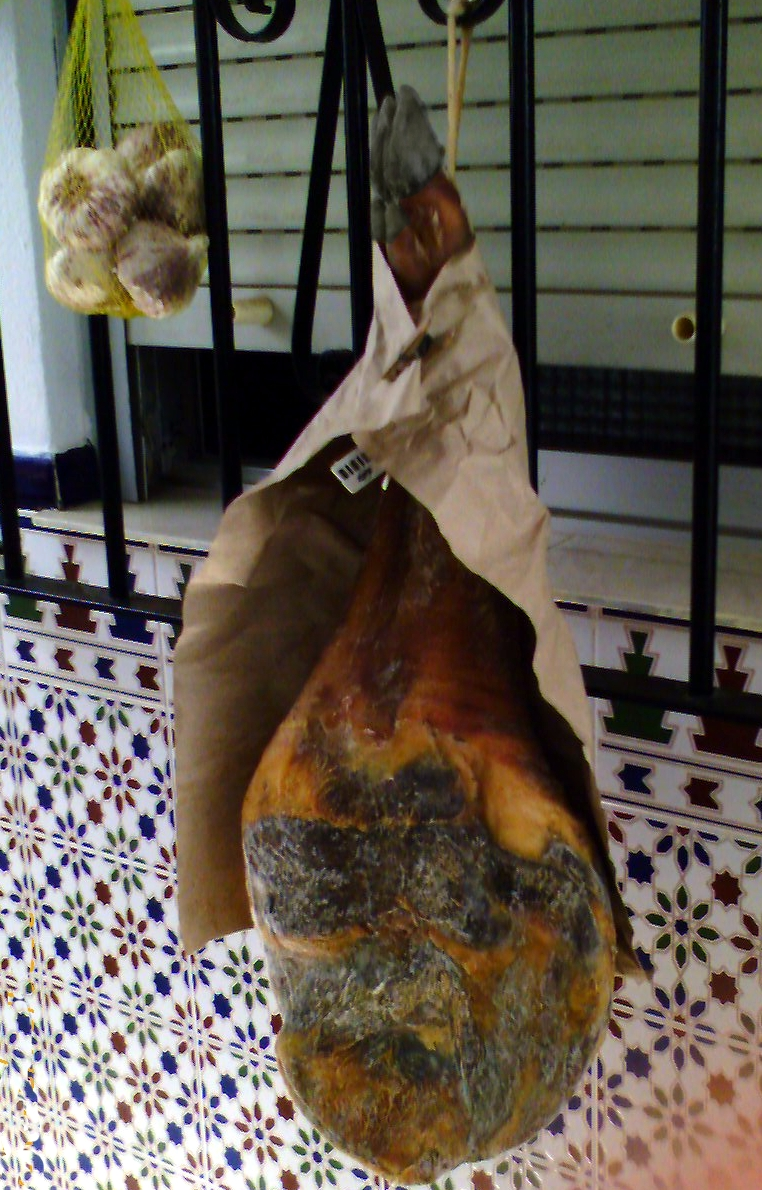
Jamón, dry-cured pork ham

Typical Andalucian dishes include pescaito frito (fried fish), gazpacho, Cordoban salmorejo, pringá, oxtail, jamón ibérico (Iberian ham), prepared olives, alboronía, poleá, anise, and various kinds of wine, including sherries (fino, manzanilla, oloroso, Pedro Ximénez, amontillado) which are undoubtedly the most exported and most widely available of all Spanish wines, as well as Málaga wine. The wine from Montilla, while similar to sherry, is not technically a sherry, but gives its name to amontillado, meaning "in the style of Montilla".

Some other Andalucian dishes include:

- Salmorejo (Córdoba)
- Flamenquín (Córdoba)
- Ajoblanco (Málaga-Cádiz)
- Gazpacho andaluz (Andalucian gazpacho)
- Pipirrana (Jaén)
- Habas con calzones
- Huevos a la flamenca
- Alcauciles rellenos (Cádiz)
- Migas de harina
- Gachas
- Olla gitana
- Puchero
- Gazpachuelo (Málaga)
- Biénmesabe o adobo
- Ajo harina (Jaén)
- Soldaditos de Pavía
- Pringá
- Patatas a lo pobre
- Tortilla de patatas
- Tortillitas de camarones (Cádiz)
- Pinchitos

== See also ==
- Tapas
- List of Andalusian food and drink products with protected status
