= Puchero =

Spanish and South American stew

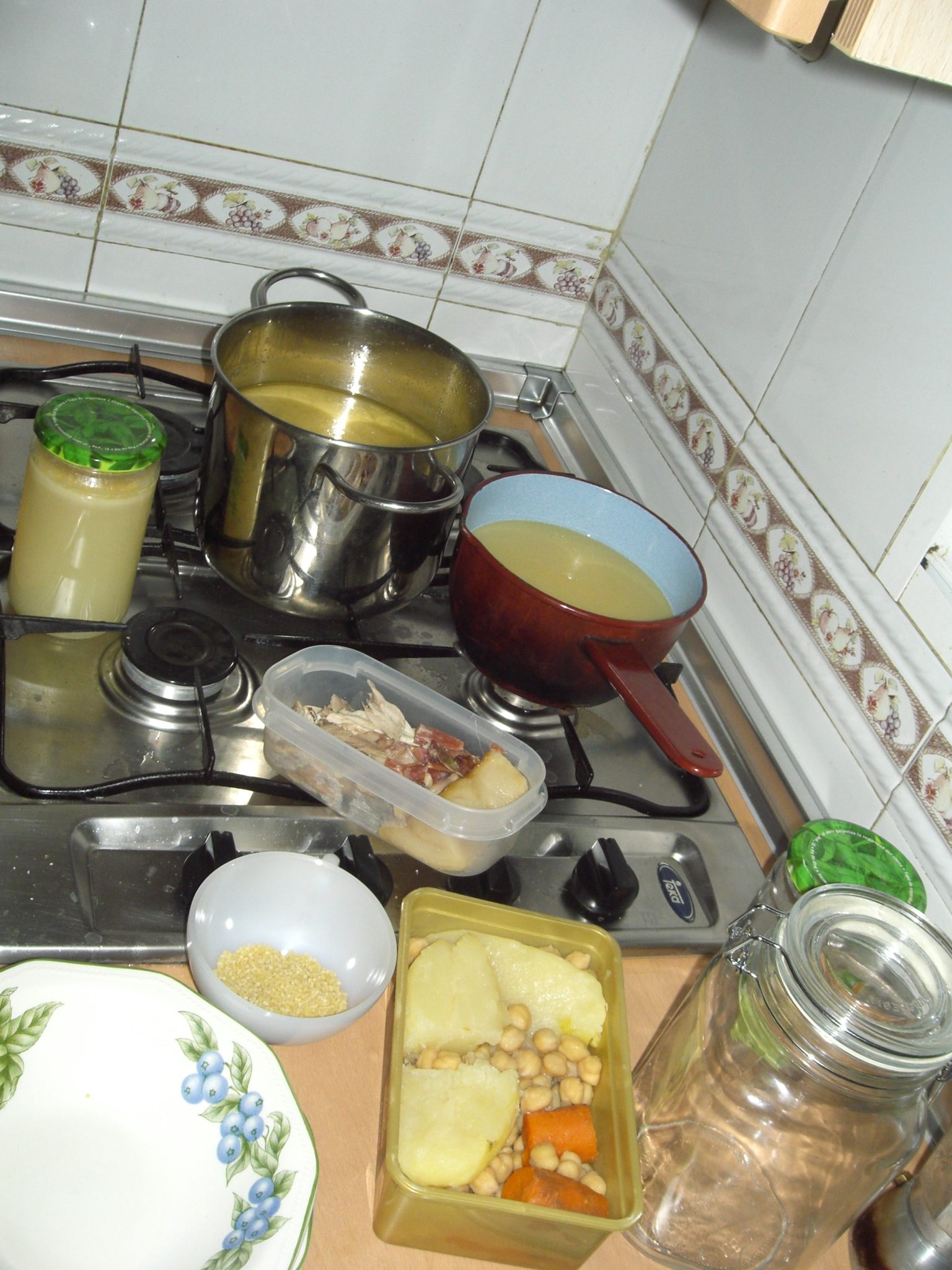
- Ready ingredients for a puchero in Andalusia, Spain
- Course: Main course
- Place of origin: Spain
- Main ingredients: Varies by region

Puchero is a type of stew originally from Spain, prepared in Yucatán, Mexico, Argentina, Paraguay, Uruguay, Perú, south of Brazil, the Philippines, and Spain, specifically the autonomous communities of Andalusia and the Canary Islands. The Spanish word "puchero" originally meant an earthenware pot, before being extended to mean any vessel, and then the dish cooked in it.

The dish is essentially equivalent to the cocido of Spain but lacks colorants (such as paprika) and uses local ingredients which vary from one region to another. In Spain, chickpeas are widely used. Puchero, cocido, and the sancocho eaten in Colombia, Ecuador, República Dominicana, Venezuela, and Puerto Rico are essentially similar dishes.

== Andalusian puchero ==
In Andalusia, puchero was originally a peasant soup. The basic ingredients of the broth are meat (beef, veal, pork or chicken), bacon, cured bones (such as those of the jamón serrano), and vegetables (potatoes, celery, chard, leek, carrots, and turnips). It can be drunk straight in mugs as a consommé known as caldo de puchero, which can be seasoned with fresh spearmint leaves or sherry. Alternatively, it can be prepared as a soup after adding chickpeas, cured ham, boiled egg, and rice, noodles or bread. The meats, called pringá, are usually served separately as a main dish, and the remnants used for subsequent dishes as croquettes or ropa vieja.

== Río de la Plata puchero ==
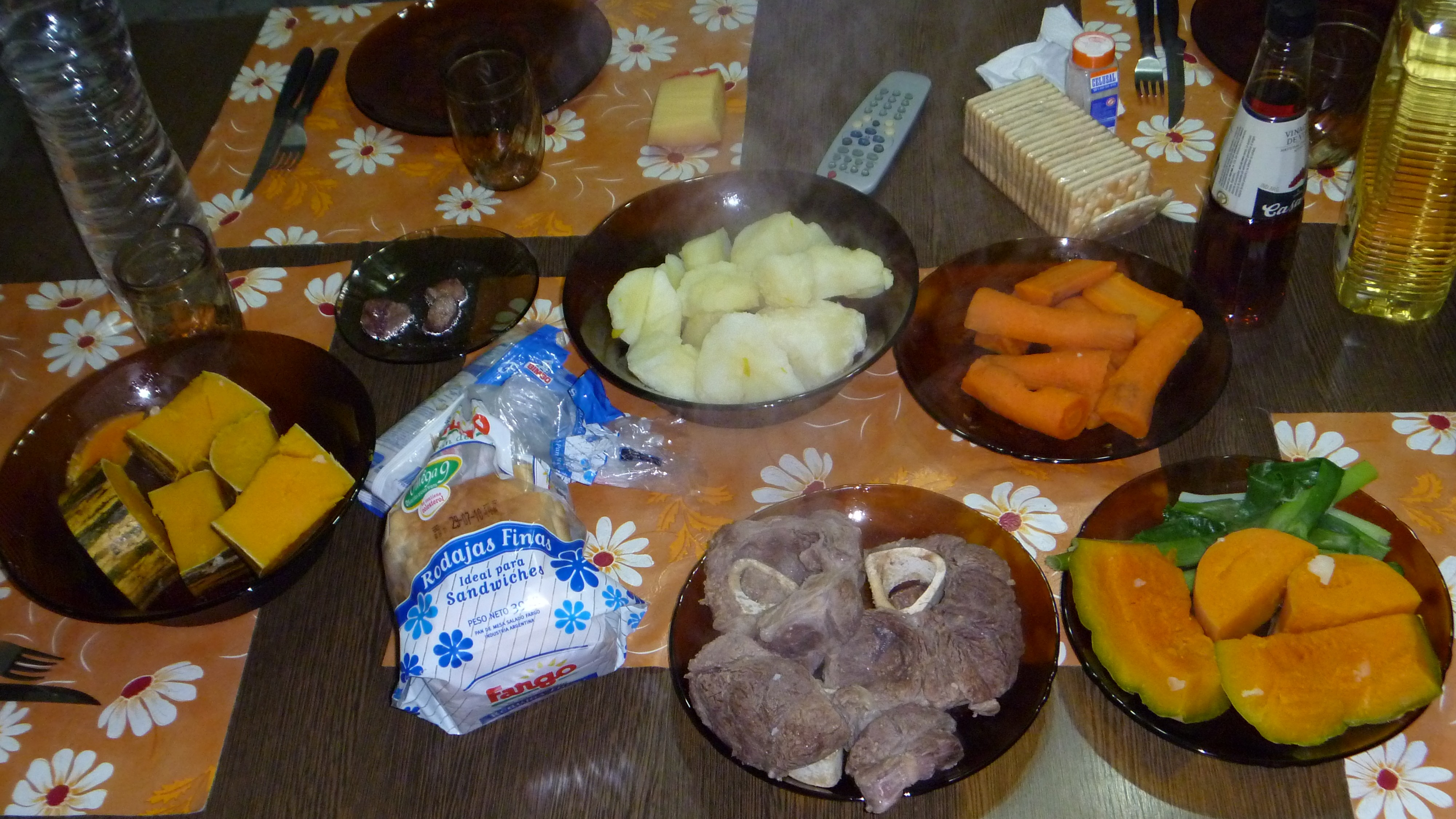
Argentine puchero

Puchero is eaten in the parts of Argentina, Uruguay, and Paraguay that border the Río de la Plata. The dish is prepared in the same way as in Spain, though its ingredients differ according to the very different local produce. In the parts of Argentina, Paraguay and Uruguay surrounding the estuary of the Río de la Plata, puchero is primarily beef-based—beef was plentiful and cheap—and chickpeas are less commonly used than in the Iberian Peninsula. The broth and the solid ingredients are often consumed separately.

The cuts of meat used are particularly important: if possible, ossobuco; otherwise beef cuts with marrow or poultry (used in puchero de gallina) can be substituted. Other ingredients used may include potatoes, onions, and squash. Typical local produce used includes sweet potatoes, moderately fatty pork cuts, sweet corn, carrots, pork belly or cabbage.

Puchero is traditionally served during the colder months. It is not considered fine dining, and can be found on menus in family and regional restaurants throughout Argentina, but not at most more expensive restaurants.

== Philippine puchero ==
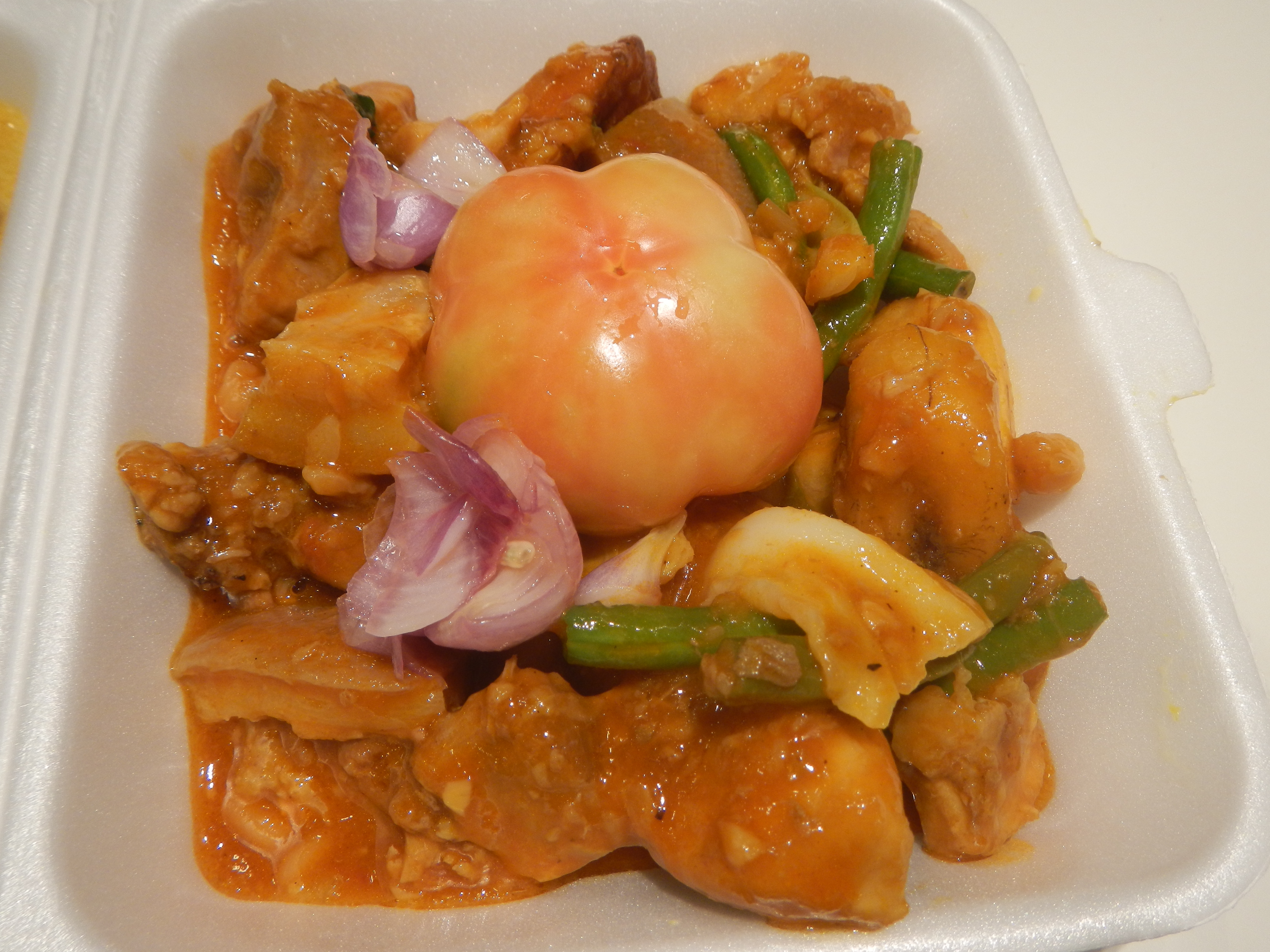
Filipino puchero from Bulacan

In Philippine cuisine, puchero (Spanish: pochero; Tagalog: putsero) is a dish composed of beef chunks stewed with saba bananas (or plantains). The dish may also include potatoes or sweet potatoes, chorizos de Bilbao, bok choy, leeks, chickpeas, cabbage and tomato sauce. Other versions replace beef with chicken or pork.

Chicken pochero is cooked with a combination of minced red onion and cloves of garlic, diced large tomatoes, sweet potatoes and chicken, sliced chorizo de Bilbao and bok choy, tomato sauce, cabbage, green beans, green peas, soy sauce and patís.

== Yucatec puchero ==
The Yucatec puchero varies by cook and region. The most complete version is called puchero de tres carnes—"with three meats", pork, beef and chicken. Other ingredients may include a piece of plantain in skin, onion, potatoes, sweet potatoes, carrots, squash (calabaza), turnips or parsnips, white cabbage (repollo) and typically a type of pasta soup (noodles, fideos) and rice to increase the heartiness and especially if only one or two meats are used. The soup like the 98% of Yucatec soups-stews are broth consommés, not at all thick or heavy. It is flavored with saffron, allspice and black pepper. The dish is served with all ingredients in the bowl and a side of fresh additions. Typically or traditionally, a side plate is provided so that the person can put the meat to the side while eating the soup. The garnish consists of freshly chopped or diced habanero chili, onion, radish and cilantro. Avocados when in season. See Steffan Igor Ayora Diaz book on the anthropology of Yucatán food

== See also ==
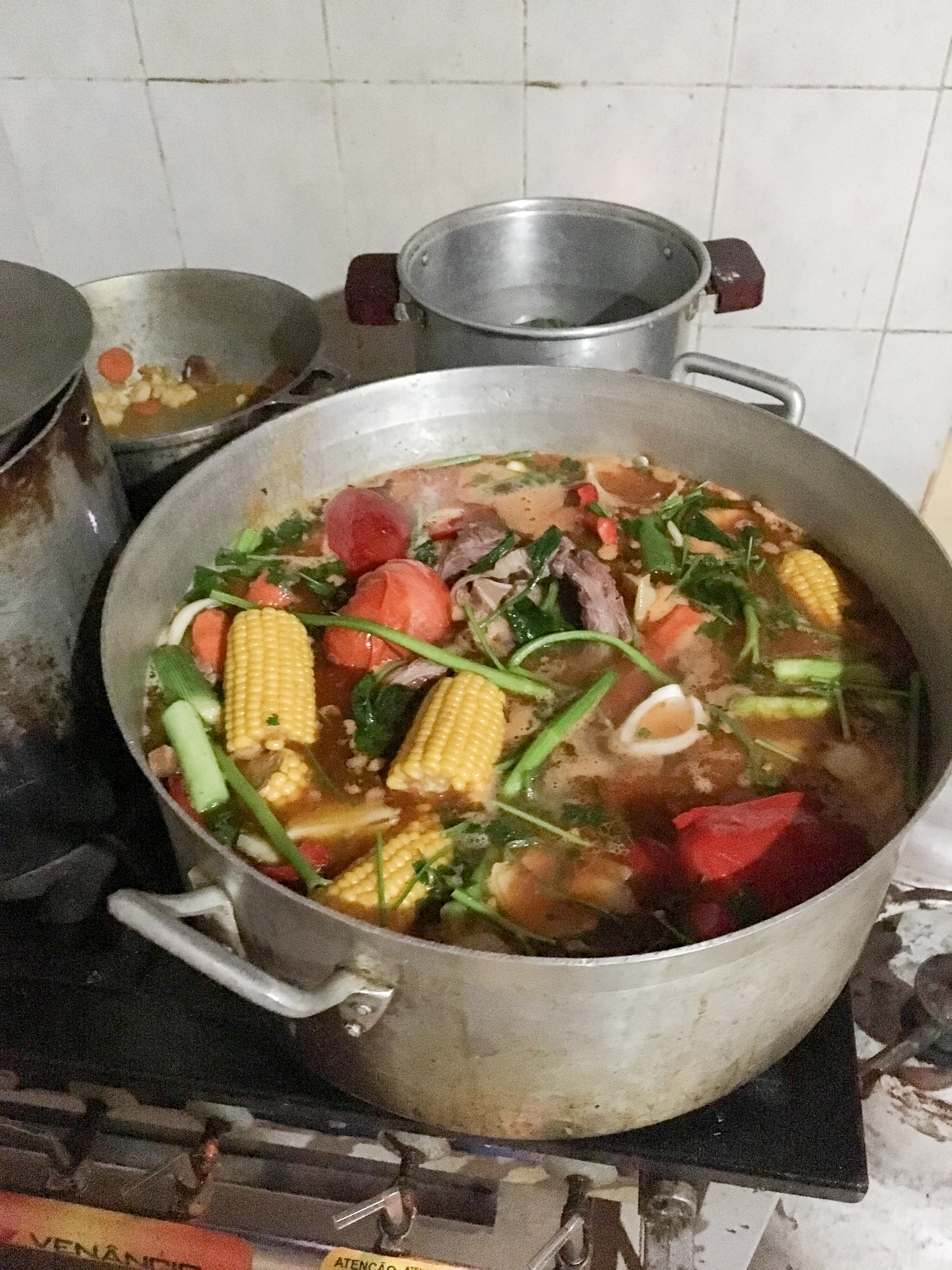
Puchero in Uruguay

- Andalusian cuisine
- Argentine cuisine
- Canarian cuisine
- Colombian cuisine
- List of stews
- Philippine cuisine
- Sayur asem
- Sinigang
- Uruguayan cuisine
