= Jamonera =

Form of clamp used to hold the leg of jamón serrano

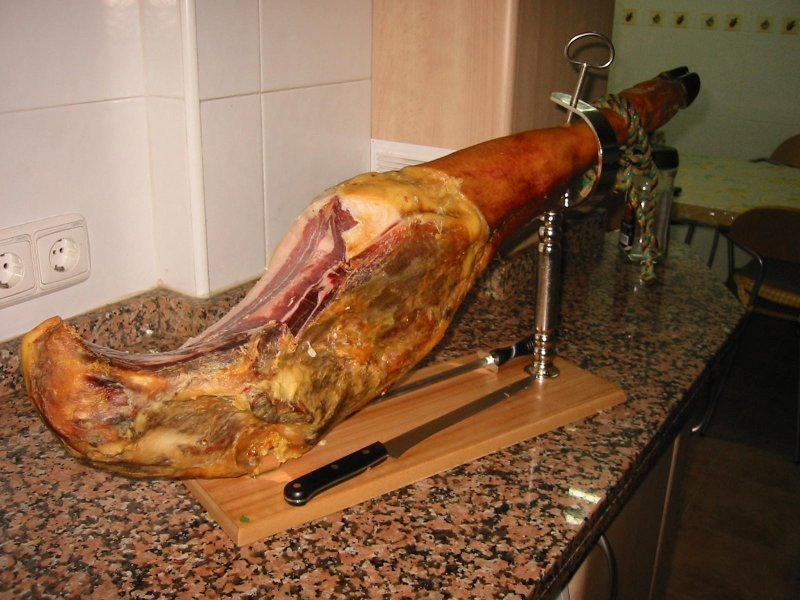
A leg of serrano ham fixed to a jamonera, with a jamonero knife in the foreground

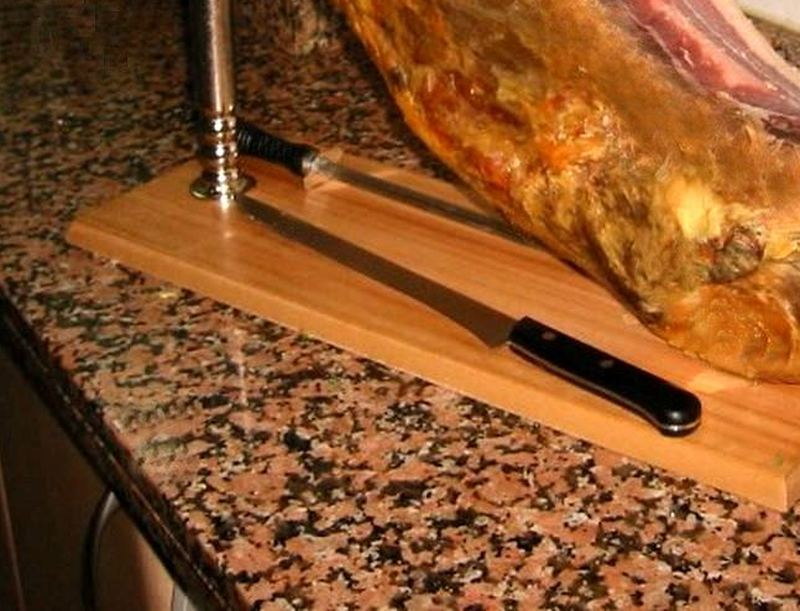
Jamonero knife

A jamonera (Spanish pronunciation: [xamoˈneɾa]), also known as a portajamones or jamonero, is a clamp attached to a wooden stand, specifically designed to hold a leg of jamón serrano (Spanish cured ham) or jamón ibérico whilst it is sliced. The long and flexible bladed knife used to carve the ham is known as a cuchillo jamonero (Spanish pronunciation: [xamoˈneɾo]).

The device originated in Spain and traditionally has a simple, stout wooden base onto which a metal spike and clamp are fixed. The thinner end of the leg is clamped in an elevated position, while the shank rests on the wood, secured by the spike. Once mounted, the ham is normally stored this way at room temperature, often simply covered with a cloth to prevent excessive drying.
