= Rabbit stew =

Rabbit meat dish

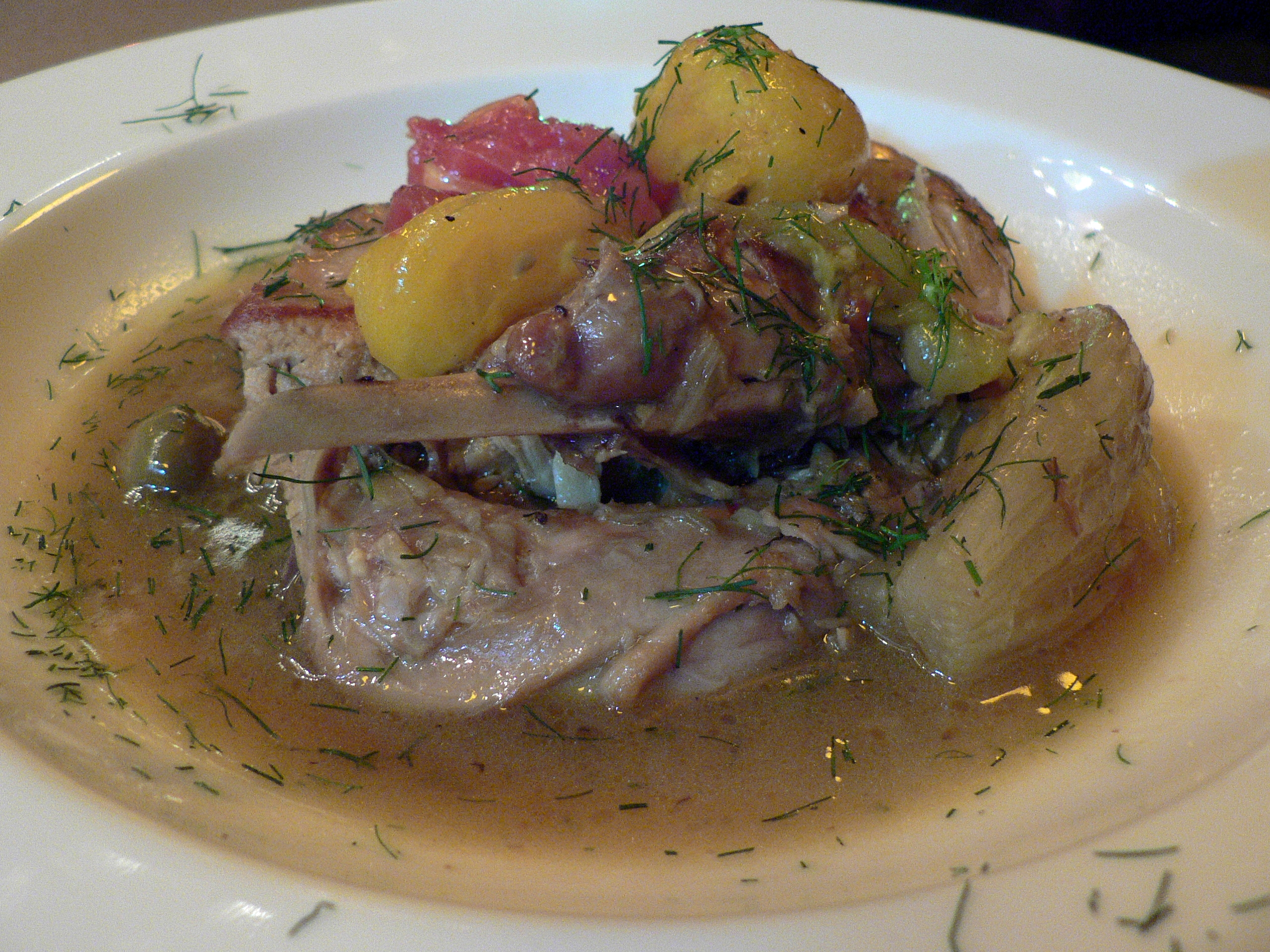
A rabbit stew

Rabbit stew, also referred to as hare stew when hare is used, is a stew prepared using rabbit meat as a main ingredient. Stuffat tal-Fenek, a variation of rabbit stew, is the national dish of Malta. Other traditional regional preparations of the dish exist, such as coniglio all'ischitana on the island of Ischia, German Hasenpfeffer and jugged hare in Great Britain and France. Hare stew dates back to at least the 14th century, and was published in The Forme of Cury during this time as a recipe for stewed hare. Rabbit stew is a traditional dish of the Algonquin people and is also a part of the cuisine of the Greek islands. Hare stew was commercially manufactured and canned circa the early 1900s in western France and eastern Germany.

== Overview ==
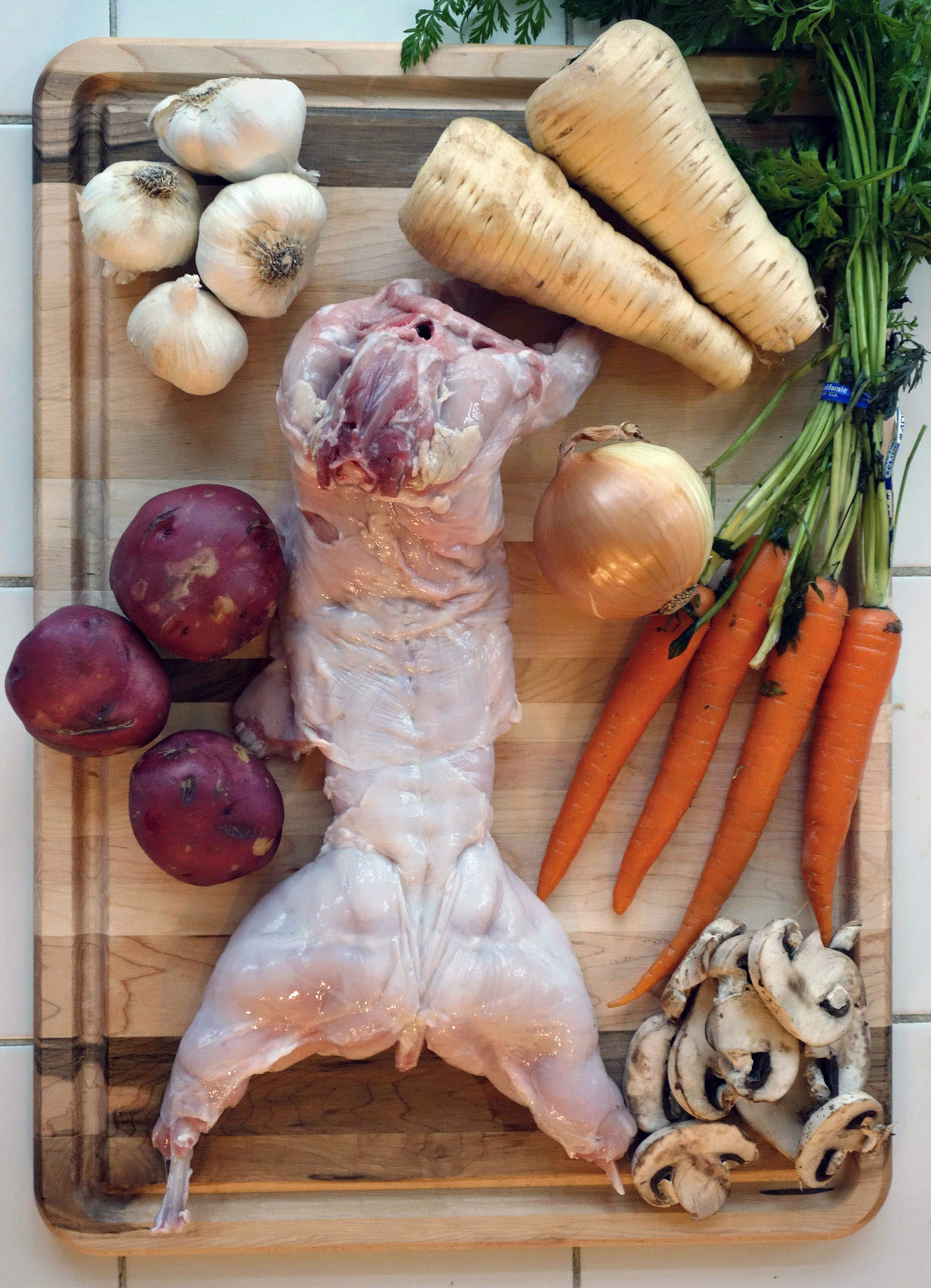
Some rabbit stew ingredients

Rabbit stew is prepared using rabbit meat as a primary ingredient. Additional ingredients can include potato, carrot, onion, celery, garlic, wine and various herbs and spices. The rabbit can be marinated in a liquid, such as red wine, prior to cooking. (Note: "...classic rabbit stew marinated in dry red wine...) The blood of the hare or rabbit has historically been used in some preparations of hare stew and rabbit stew to thicken and enrich it, and this practice is sometimes used in contemporary preparations. A more recent example of this is in England (circa the 1910s and prior to this time), whereby the blood was sometimes used to enrich hare stew.

== Varieties ==
Conejo en salmorejo is a very common rabbit stew dish in the Canary Islands prepared using marinated rabbit. Ingredients used in the marinade include wine, olive oil, cumin, garlic and various herbs, and it is an aromatic dish. It is sometimes served accompanied with Canarian wrinkly potatoes.

Coniglio all'ischitana is a traditional rabbit stew dish on the island of Ischia, which located off of the coast of Naples, Italy. Ingredients in Coniglio all'ischitana include rabbit, tomato, white wine, garlic, chili pepper and herbs such as rosemary, thyme, marjoram and basil.

Fenkata is a traditional Maltese communal meal and feast prepared using rabbit in various dishes, and may include stuffat tal-fenek, a rabbit stew, served atop spaghetti.

Hasenpfeffer is a traditional stew in German cuisine prepared using hare or rabbit as a primary ingredient. Some preparation variations exist, but the blood of the hare or rabbit is traditionally used, which serves to thicken the stew. It is typically a very flavorful and delicious stew.

Jugged hare and jugged rabbit are dishes that involves stewing an entire hare or rabbit that has been cut at the joints in a process called jugging. The blood of the hare or rabbit is traditionally included in jugged hare, which serves to thicken and enrich the dish. Additional ingredients in both dishes include typical stew ingredients such as vegetables and spices. Wine, such as Port, and juniper berries are used in jugged hare. Jugged hare is a traditional dish in Great Britain and France, and used to be a staple food in Great Britain. Jugged hare is included in early editions of the book The Art of Cookery made Plain and Easy. The book was first published in 1747. Rabbit stew is also popular in Romani cuisine, typically prepared with innards, bacon and onions.

== History ==
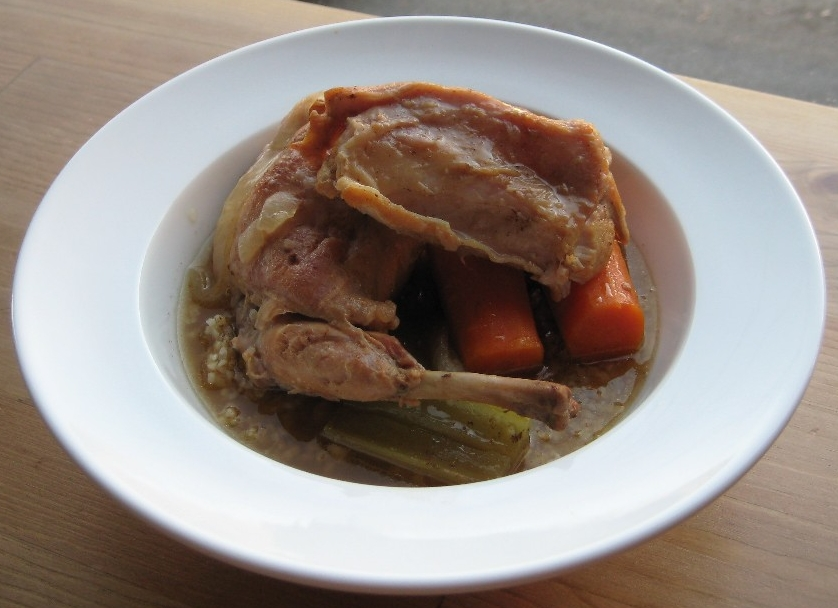
Rabbit stew with carrot and celery

A stewed hare dish is included in The Forme of Cury, a book of English recipes published in the 14th century. The recipe therein called for the use of noodles in the dish, with an option to use wafers or oblatas in place of noodles.

Both hare stew and rabbit stew are included in Le Viandier de Taillevent, a recipe collection with an initial publishing dated to circa 1300. It is unclear when these recipes first appeared in the cookbook, which was published in 24 editions. The hare stew recipe therein calls for the dish to be black in color, whereas the recipe for rabbit stew calls for it to be a bit lighter in color compared to the hare stew.

Hare stew is included in volume 2 of Le Ménagier de Paris, which was first published in print form by Baron Jérôme Pichon in 1846. This recipe called for the use of several spices, including ginger, nutmeg, cinnamon, grain of paradise, cloves and pepper, or other exotic spices. These spices were expensive during this time.

Rabbit stew is a traditional dish of the Algonquin people, an indigenous people of North America.

Rabbit stew has been described as a "kind of national dish in Crete", Greece, and is also prepared on the Greek island of Icaria, where hares and partridges comprise the primary game meats available.

Circa the early 1900s in eastern France and western Germany, hare stew was commercially prepared and canned by various packers. Circa the early 1900s in the United States, rabbit stew was prepared using domestic or wild rabbits.

== Similar dishes ==
Rabbit ragù is an Italian sauce and/or dish prepared using rabbit meat, tomato puree, vegetables and spices. Pasta such as pappardelle and Parmigiano-Reggiano are added to create the dish.

== See also ==
- Brunswick stew – sometimes prepared using rabbit meat
- List of stews
