= Poleá =

Spanish variant of porridge

Poleá (in Spanish: poleá, literally "pulley") is a typical recipe of Andalusian cuisine, particularly the provinces of Seville, Huelva, and Cádiz. It is a variant of porridge typical of those consumed in hard times (it was a common dish during the Spanish Civil War). The dish is made with water, flour, salt, anise, milk, and sugar. Other ingredients are sometimes added, such as fruit, honey, anisette, cinnamon, or Galium aparine (cleavers). It is usually served with croutons of fried bread.

== See also ==
Gachas
