= Flamenquín =

Andalusian ham dish

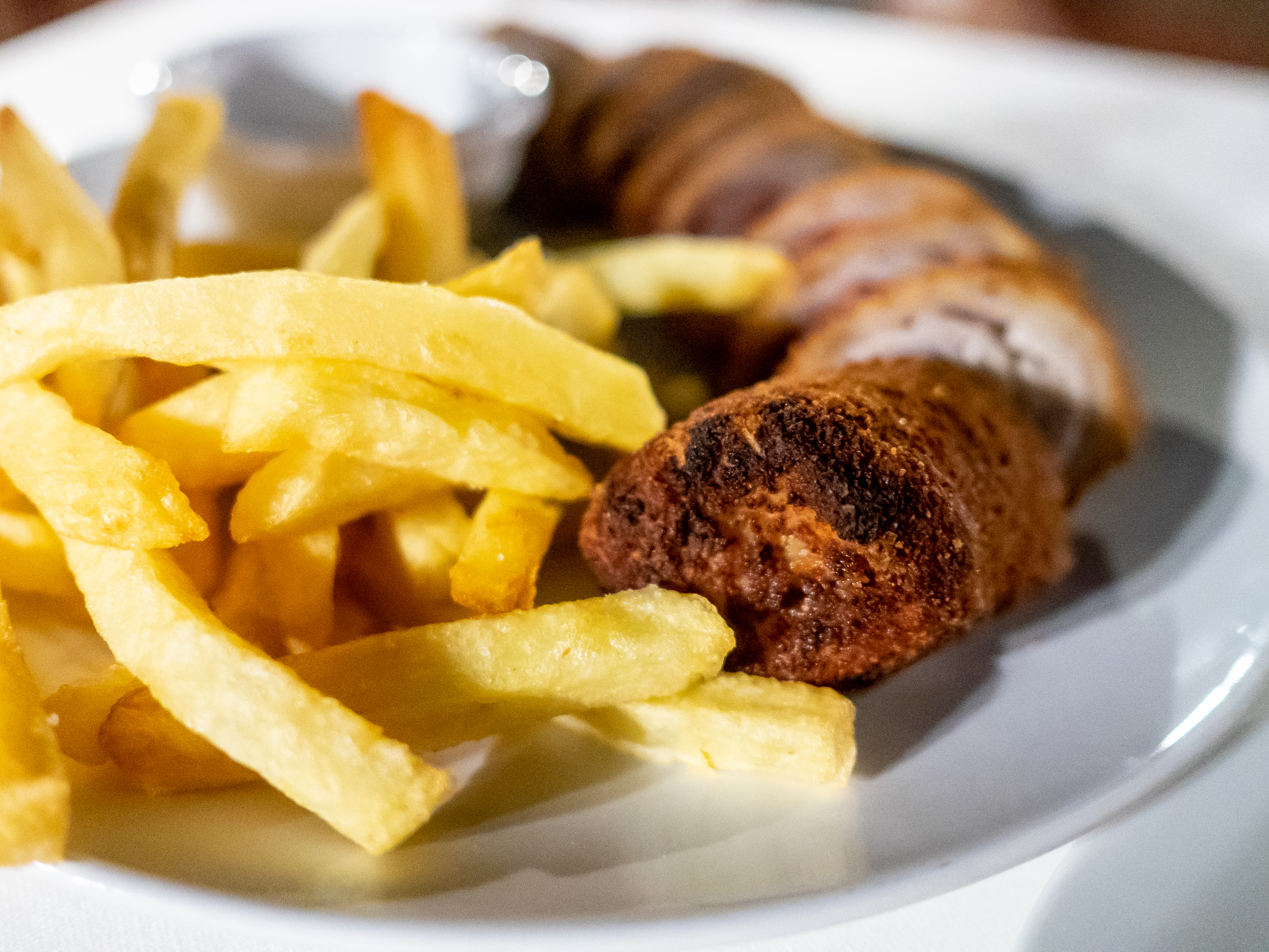
Flamenquín (chopped) served in Cordoba.

The flamenquín is a traditional dish from Cordoba (Andalusia) made with slices of jamón serrano wrapped in pieces of pork loin, coated breadcrumb batter, and deep-fried. It is often garnished with French fries and mayonnaise. A common variation replaces the loin with boiled ham. It can also be made with other fillings, such as fish, cheese, or poultry.

The size of the finished roll ranges from a small ball up to pieces 40 centimetres (16 in) long, and can be served sliced or whole.

The dish is also popular among Gitanos.

== Origin of the name ==
This dish derives its name from an intriguing tale that intertwines with the very king of Spain. Flamenquín, in literal terms, translates to "Little Flemish". The crispy, golden crust of flamenquín bore a striking resemblance to the fair-haired Flemish aides who accompanied King Carlos I during the 16th century.

== See also ==
- Roulade
- Spanish cuisine
