= Patatas a lo pobre =

Andalusian potato dish

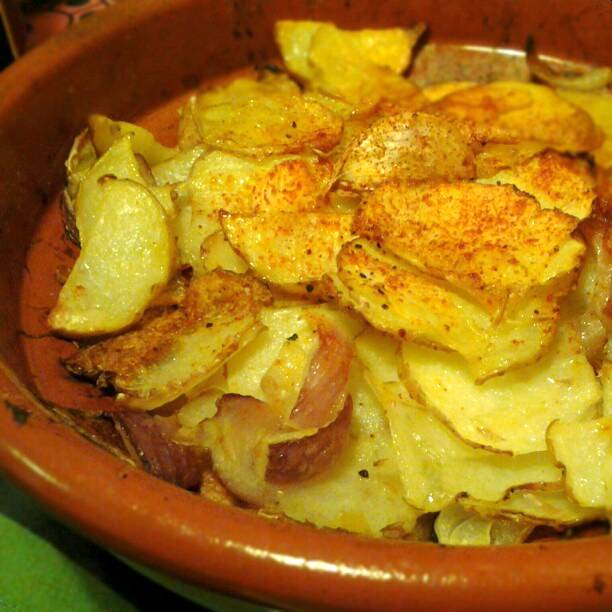
- Patatas a lo pobre
- Alternative names: Poor man's potatoes
- Course: Tapas or side dish
- Place of origin: Spain
- Region or state: Andalusia
- Serving temperature: Hot
- Main ingredients: Potatoes, onions, olive oil, vinegar, garlic, bell peppers
- Variations: Eggs

Patatas a lo pobre (lit. 'poor man's potatoes') is a simple potato dish from Andalusian cuisine. To make the dish thinly sliced potatoes are fried in olive oil to a very soft consistency (like confit potatoes) with onion. Then the oil is drained and garlic, parsley and vinegar are added to the hot frying pan to season the finished dish. They can also be served with an egg (con huevo). Some other ingredients like bell peppers, garlic and wine vinegar can be used.
