= Pringá =

Andalusian meat dish

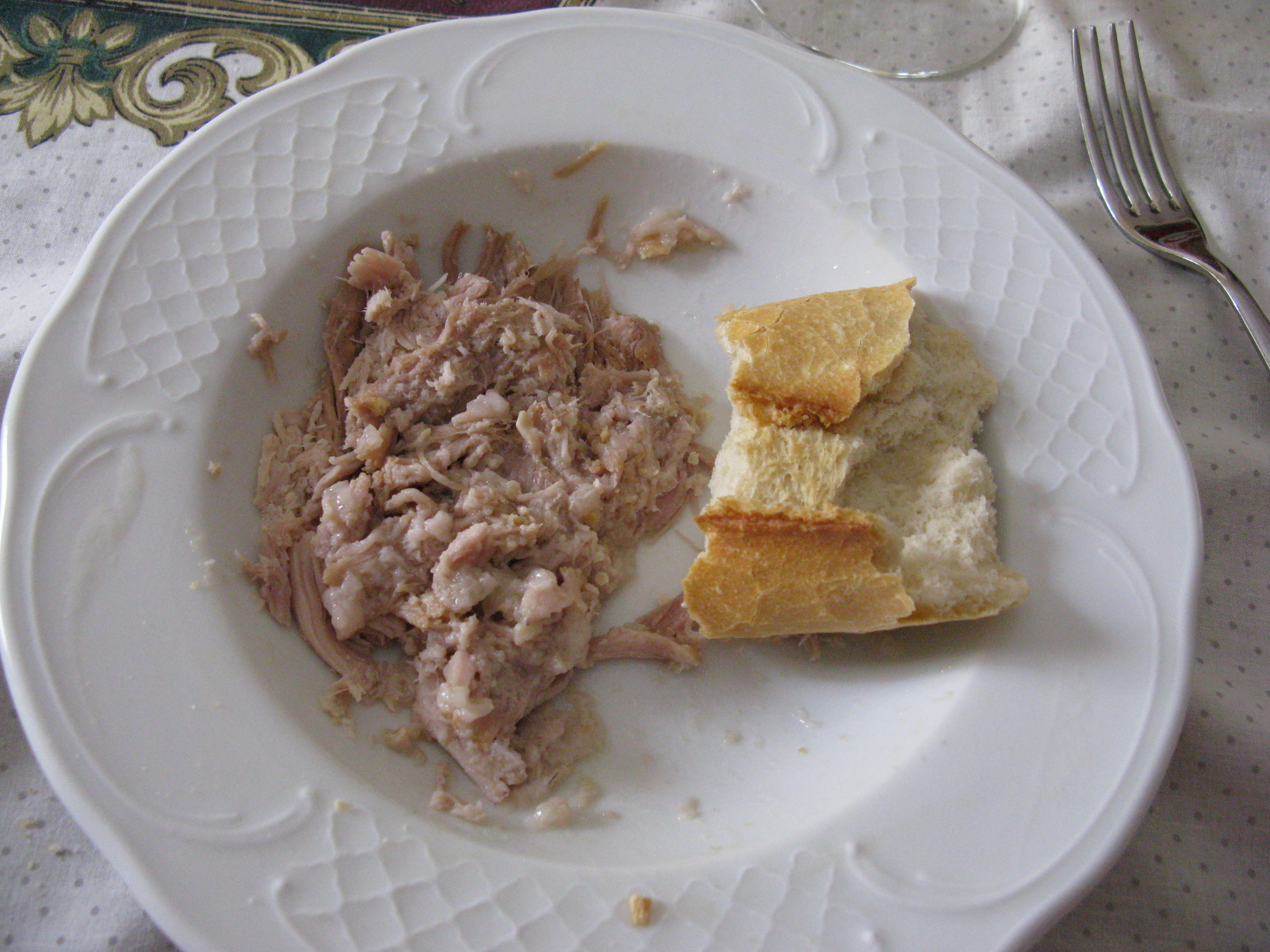
Traditional dish of pringá of Andalusian puchero, after bread-smashing

Pringá is a Spanish dish popular in Andalusia, which consists of roast beef or pork, cured sausages such as chorizo and morcilla, and beef or pork fat slow-cooked for many hours until the meat falls apart easily. Pieces of crusty bread are used to pull away a little meat, sausage, and fat. It is a social dish eaten around the family dinner table.

Pringá is usually part of other dishes, most often added to chickpea puchero, eaten either after the liquid is taken as soup, or with the liquid.

== See also ==
- Ropa vieja
- Andalusian cuisine
- List of sausage dishes
