= Soldaditos de Pavía =

Andalusian tapas dish

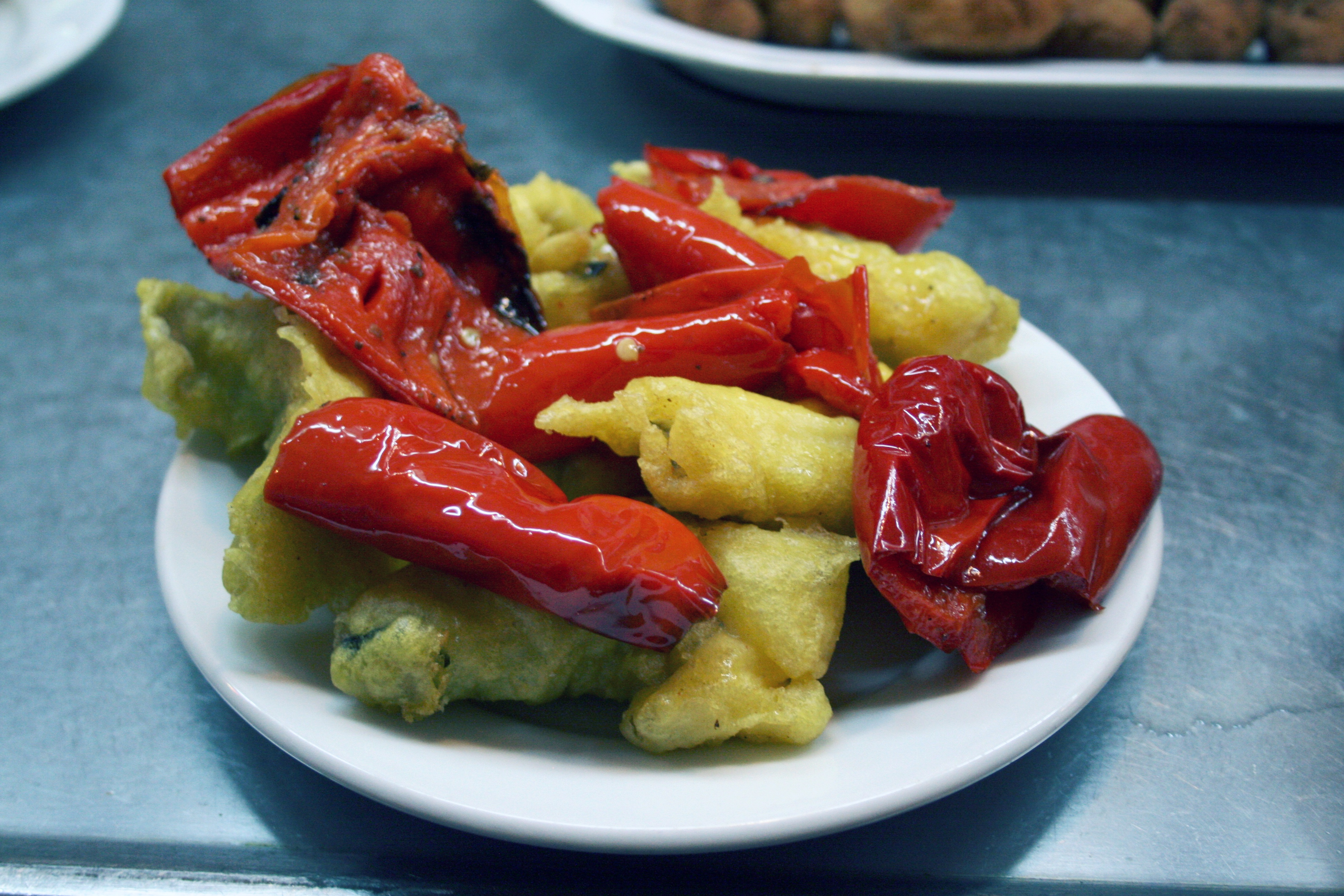
- Soldaditos de Pavía
- Course: Tapas
- Place of origin: Spain
- Region or state: Andalusia, Madrid
- Serving temperature: Hot
- Main ingredients: Cod, roasted red pepper

Soldaditos de Pavía (lit. “little soldiers of Pavia”) is a dish of fried cod wrapped in a slice of roasted red pepper. The dish is found in Andalusian cuisine and common at tapas bars in Madrid, capital of Spain. The cod is marinated in a paprika and lemon juice mix. Before being fried, the pieces of cod can be placed in cold seasoned water and removed when the water begins to boil. It's said to be a popular dish after Easter in the 1905 cookbook by Manuel Maria Puga y Parga.

The name of the dish may be taken from the similarity in colour of its wrapping of red pepper to the orange-red uniforms of the Hussars.
