= Hasenpfeffer =

Rabbit stew

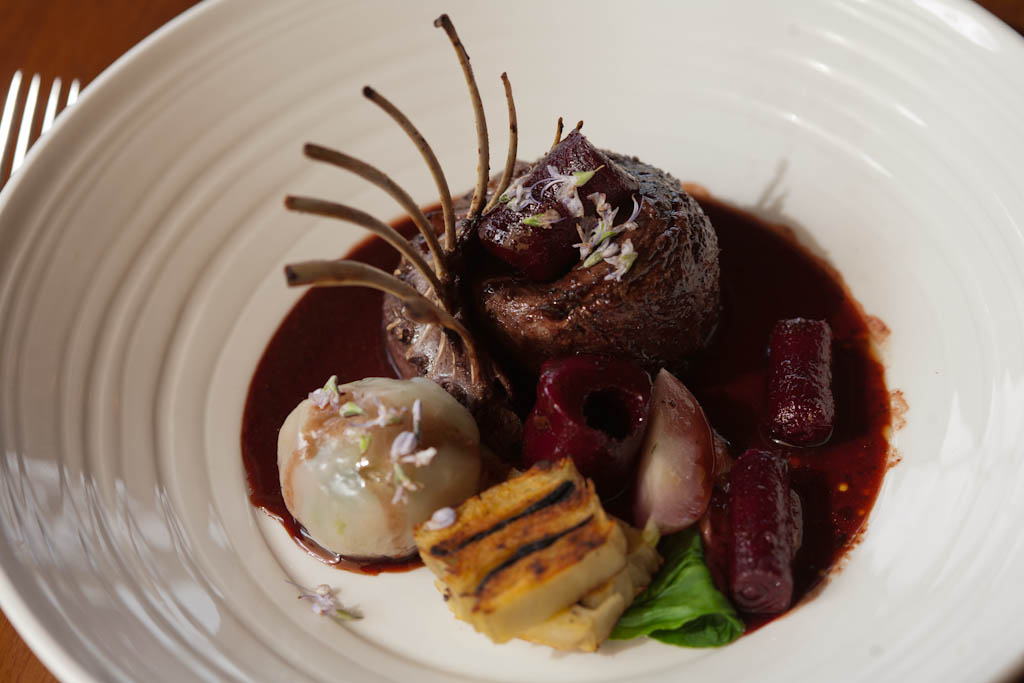
- Type: Stew
- Place of origin: Netherlands, Germany
- Main ingredients: Rabbit or hare, onions, wine

Hasenpfeffer is a traditional stew in Dutch and German cuisine made from marinated hare or rabbit meat, cut into stewing-meat sized pieces and braised with onions and a marinade made from wine and vinegar.

== Description ==
In German Hase means "hare" and Pfeffer means "pepper".

In Dutch the term "Hazenpeper" was first attested in 1599 and also mentioned in 1778, both meaning 'a dish made with the meat of a hare'.

In the Netherlands the dish is often made with the spiced cake called ontbijtkoek (also referred to as "peperkoek") to give it extra flavour and texture. In Germany ginger cookies called "Pfeffernüsse" are generally used.

== See also ==
- List of stews
- Rabbit stew
