= Stuffat tal-Fenek =

National dish of Malta

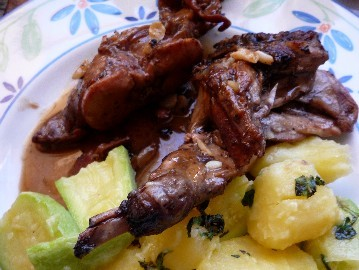

Stuffat tal-Fenek is a type of rabbit stew in Maltese cuisine. It is the national dish of Malta. It is typically slow-cooked or braised with wine, tomatoes, garlic, bay leaves, cloves, salt, pepper and vegetables. It is sometimes served in two courses by pouring the sauce over pasta as a first course and serving the rabbit and vegetables as a main course.

The dish may have originated as a form of symbolic resistance to the hunting restrictions imposed by the Knights of St John. The dish gained in popularity after the lifting of restrictions in the late 18th century (and by which time the indigenous breed, Tax-Xiber, had multiplied and prices dropped) and after local domestication of rabbits, a practice which may have been imported from France.
