= Jamón =

Spanish dry-cured ham

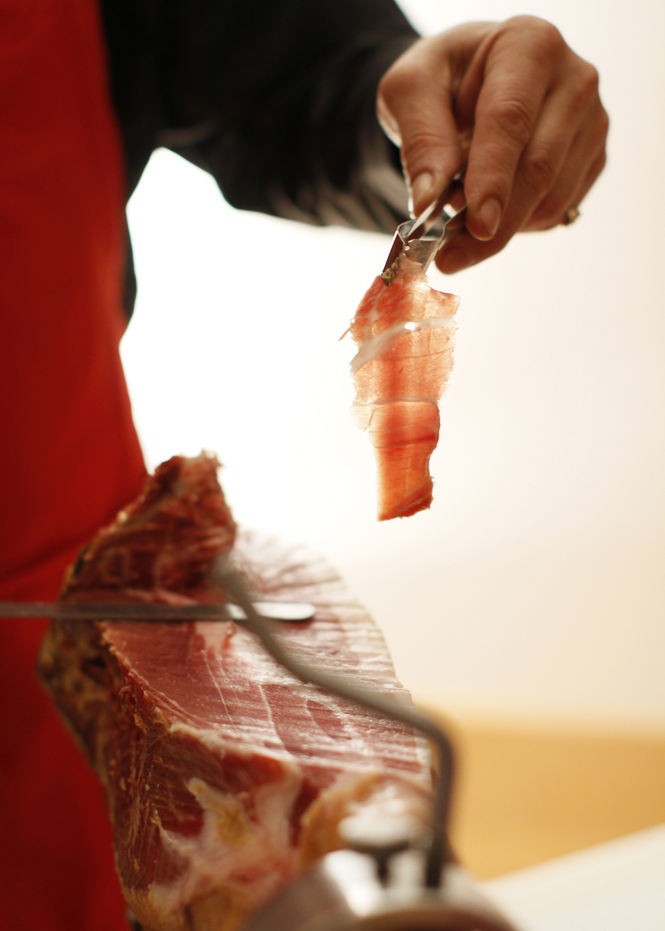
- Alternative names: Jamón serrano
- Course: Tapas, appetiser
- Place of origin: Spain
- Serving temperature: Room temperature
- Main ingredients: Ham
- Variations: Jamón ibérico

Jamón (Spanish: [xaˈmon]; pl.: jamones) is a type of dry-cured ham produced in Spain. It is one of the most globally recognised food items of Spanish cuisine. It is also regularly a component of tapas.

Jamón is the Spanish word for ham. As such, other ham products produced or consumed in Spanish-speaking countries are also called by this name. In Spain, the term jamón serrano is sometimes used to avoid confusion.

Spanish dry-cured ham comes in a wide range of prices and qualities; as of 2019, typical prices ranged from €5.00 to €75.00 per kilogram, depending on several factors, such as length of curing time, breed of pig, and the pig's diet.

== Description ==
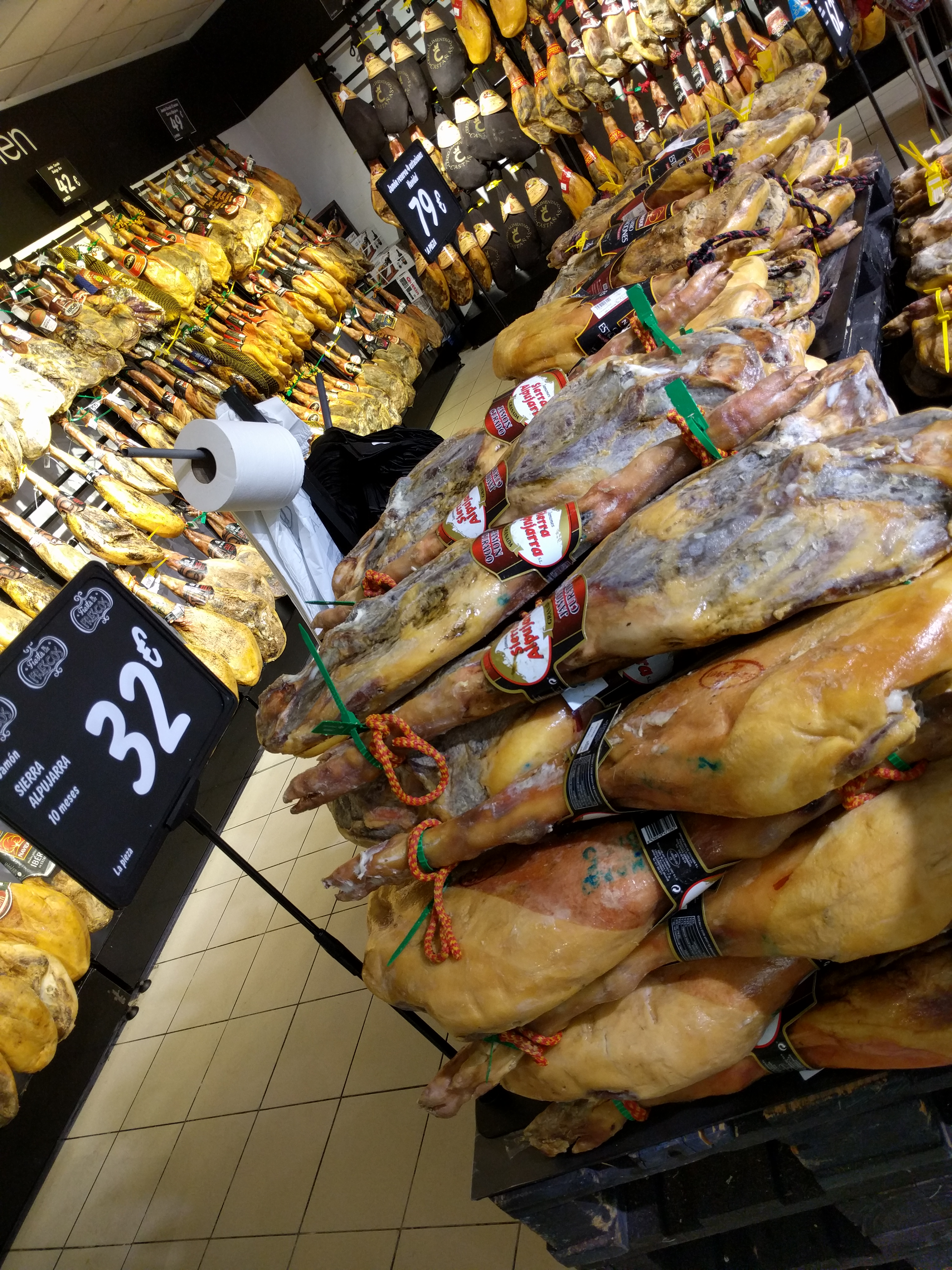
A pile of Jamon for sale on special offer in Spain

Jamón is typically consumed in slices, either manually carved from a pig's hind leg held on a jamonero stand using a sharp thin slicing knife, or cut from the deboned meat with a meat slicer. It is also regularly consumed in any shape in small portions.

As a product, jamón is similar to Portuguese presunto and to Italian prosciutto, but the production differs by a longer curing phase (up to 18 months), giving a dryer texture, deeper color and stronger flavour.

A whole jamón leg is considerably cheaper by weight than its sliced counterpart because it includes the bone and non-edible fat and skin. Once the external fat layers are removed and the meat is exposed, the product must be consumed as soon as possible since a progressive drying and deteriorating process starts. This is not an issue for restaurateurs and retailers, since they go through product much faster than an individual. Home users will typically choose sliced product, be it freshly cut from a deli stand, commercially pre-packaged or vacuum preserved. Jamón is safe to consume as long as the leg is kept in a dry and cool environment and out of direct sunlight, but it must be kept refrigerated once cut away from the leg.

Jamón may also be smoked in some regions, where it is used mostly for personal consumption. This form of ham is common in the southern areas of Castile and León as well as in parts of Extremadura. Such a jamón has a harder texture and a smoky-salty flavour.

Though widely available in Spain (even if on the expensive side) and accessible in some countries of the European Union, import duties and trade or food safety restrictions applied to foreign meat products in international markets may raise prices substantially while creating scarcity, often making jamón a prohibitively expensive product for other countries to import.

There are two main commercial labels for jamón, based on the pig breed and protected designations:

- Jamón ibérico is made from the black Iberian pig, and may be consumed internationally as a delicacy.
- Jamón serrano (meaning lit. 'sierra ham') includes most other varieties.
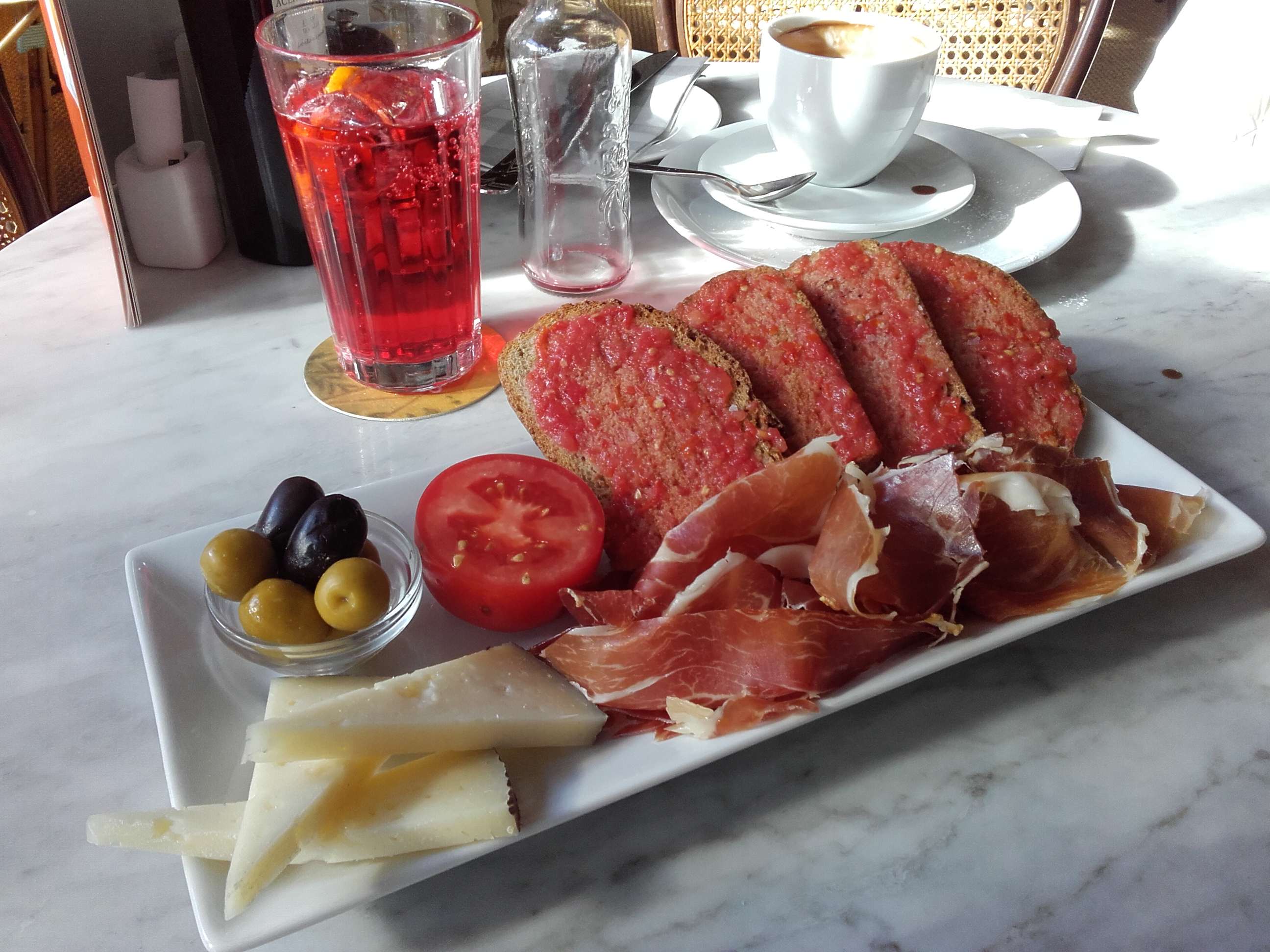
Jamón ibérico

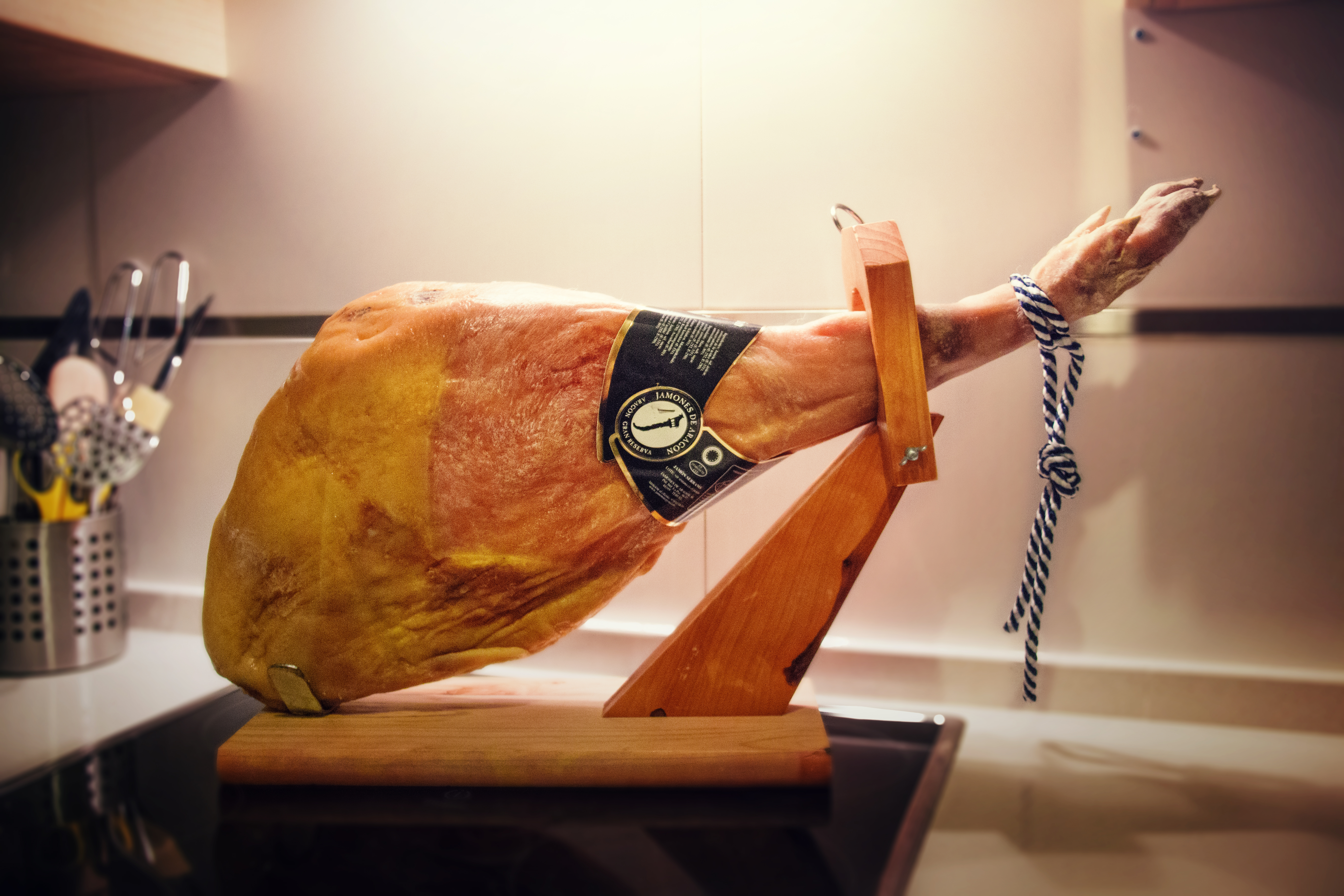
A jamón serrano leg from Teruel in a cutting stand

== Jamón serrano ==
The term jamón serrano (lit. 'serrano ham', meaning ham from the sierra, or mountain range) is regularly applied as an umbrella culinary term for all dry-cured jamón produced in Spain, as opposed to jamón de York, which is cooked whole on the bone.

It is most precisely applied, though, to jamón produced from white and/or non-Ibérico breeds of pig. This is the most commonly produced and consumed range of jamón in Spain. The majority of jamones serranos are produced from a landrace breed of white pigs or from commercial breeds such as Duroc. Jamón serrano, described variously as jamón reserva, jamón curado, and jamón extra or any generic jamón nomenclature, is produced from compound-fed white pigs.

Jamón serrano has traditional speciality guaranteed (TSG) status in the EU and the UK. The TSG certification attests that a particular food product objectively possesses specific characteristics that differentiate it from all others in its category and that its raw materials, composition, or method of production have been consistent for a minimum of 30 years.

=== Production ===
Fresh hams are trimmed and cleaned, then stacked and covered with salt for about two weeks to draw off excess moisture and preserve the meat from spoiling. The salt is then washed off, and the hams are hung to dry for about six months. Finally, the hams are hung in a cool, dry place for six to 18 months, depending on the climate, as well as the size and type of ham being cured. The drying sheds (secaderos) are usually built at higher elevations, which is why the ham is called "mountain ham".

== Jamón ibérico ==
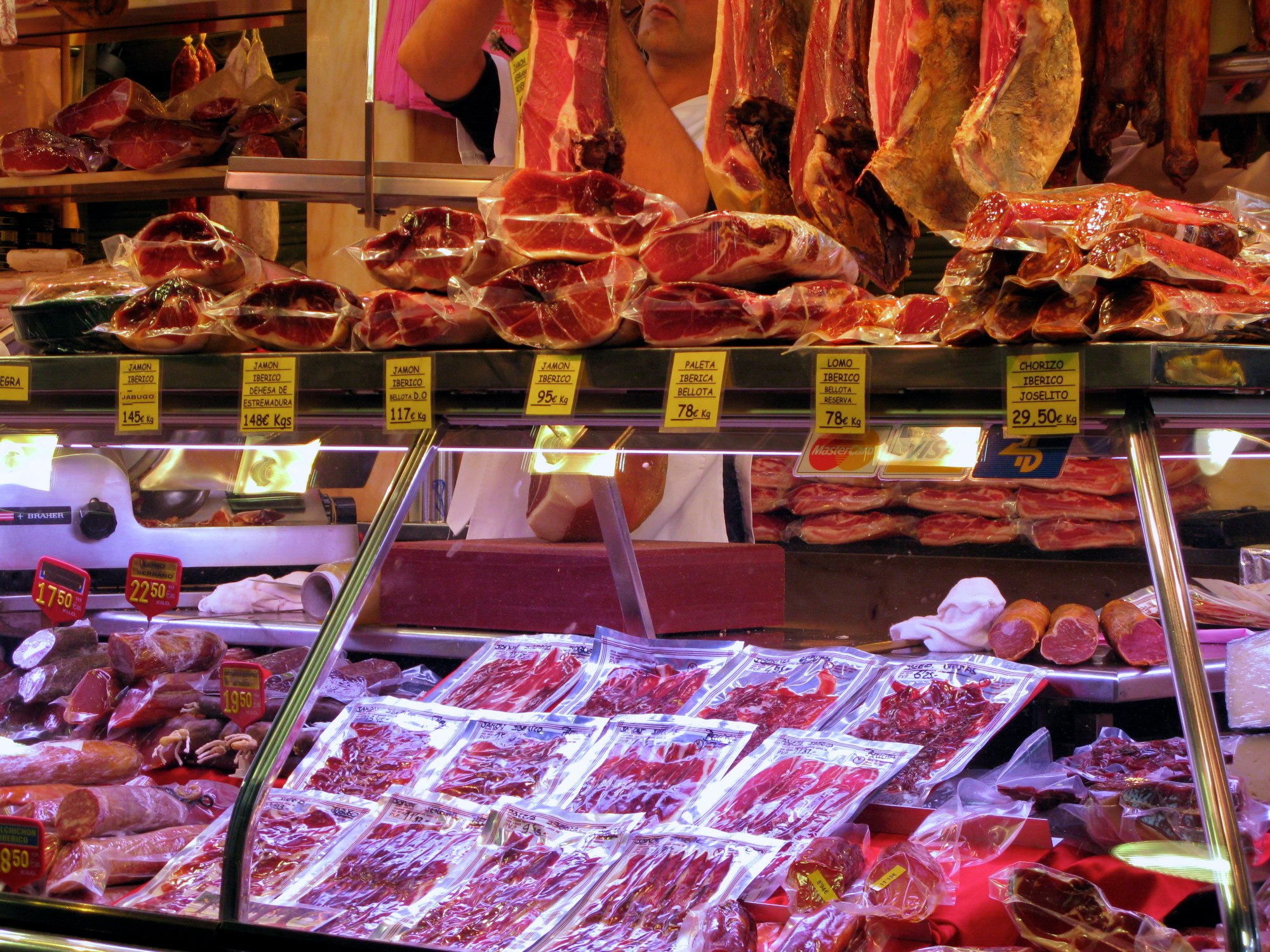
Retail jamón ibérico in Barcelona, Spain

Pork products made from Iberian-breed pigs receive the ibérico/a denomination. As such, jamón ibérico is the dry-cured jamón produced from livestock of these breeds. Ibérico encompasses some of the most expensive ham produced in the world, and its fatty marbled texture has made it very popular as a delicacy, with a hard-to-fulfill global demand comparable to that of kobe beef.

Since jamón ibérico production and export is limited, buyer should beware and not fall victim of bait-and-switch or quality fraud similar to that of olive oil, since it has been estimated that a sizable portion of both local market and exports are not actually ibérico. Spain regulation defines trade labeling for all ibérico products.

== European Union protected designation of origin ==
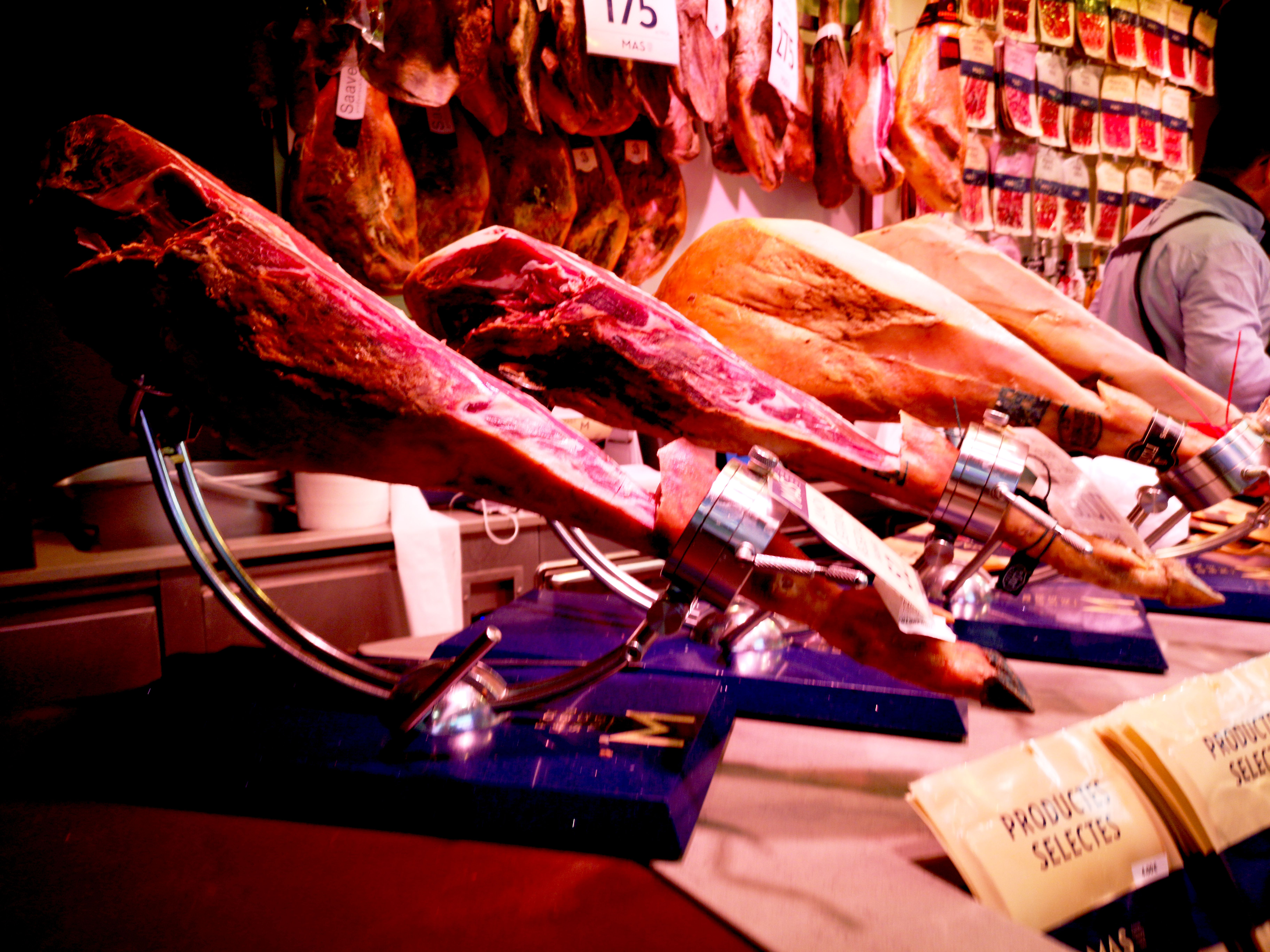
Traditional jamón marketed in Barcelona, Spain

Under the Common Agricultural Policy of the European Union (EU), certain well-established meat products, including some local jamón and jamón producers, are covered by a protected designation of origin (PDO) or protected geographical indication (PGI):

- Jamón de Teruel has PDO status.
- Jamón de Los Pedroches has PDO status.
- Jamón Dehesa de Extremadura has PDO status.
- Jamón de Guijuelo has PDO status.
- Jamón de Jabugo from Alájar, Almonaster la Real, Aracena, Aroche, Arroyomolinos de León, Cala, Campofrío, Castaño del Robledo, Cañaveral de León, Corteconcepción, Cortegana, Cortelazor, Cumbres de Enmedio, Cumbres de San Bartolomé, Cumbres Mayores, Encinasola, Fuenteheridos, Galaroza, Higuera de la Sierra, Hinojales, Jabugo, La Granada de Río-Tinto, La Nava, Linares de la Sierra, Los Marines, Puerto Moral, Rosal de la Frontera, Santa Ana la Real, Santa Olalla del Cala, Valdelarco, Zufre has PDO status.
- Jamón de Trevélez from Trevélez, Juviles, Busquístar, Pórtugos, La Tahá, Bubión, Capileira, and Bérchules has PGI status.

== Paleta ==
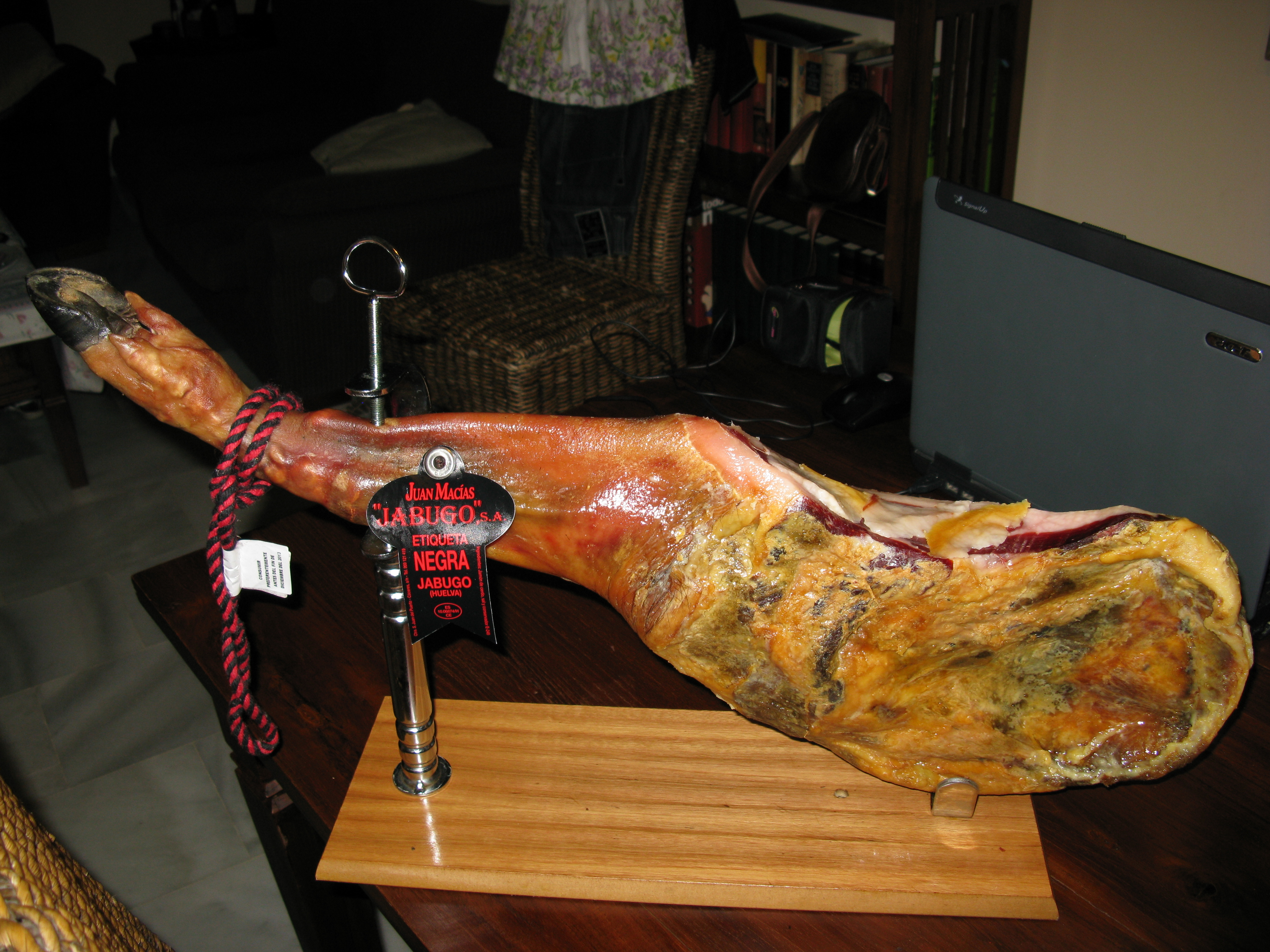
A paletilla from Jabugo, Huelva

The paleta de cerdo or paletilla is a product similar to jamón; it is made from the front leg of a pig, instead of the hind leg used for jamón, cured using the same process and consumed in the same way. Since whole legs are sold by weight and paletillas are lighter, they are often marketed towards home consumption.

A paletilla may be described or marketed as Ibérica when produced from the same livestock as jamón ibérico.

== See also ==
Media related to Jamón at Wikimedia Commons

- Spanish cuisine
- List of hams
- List of dried foods
- Curing (food preservation)
