= Alcazaba (Sierra Nevada) =

Mountain in Spain

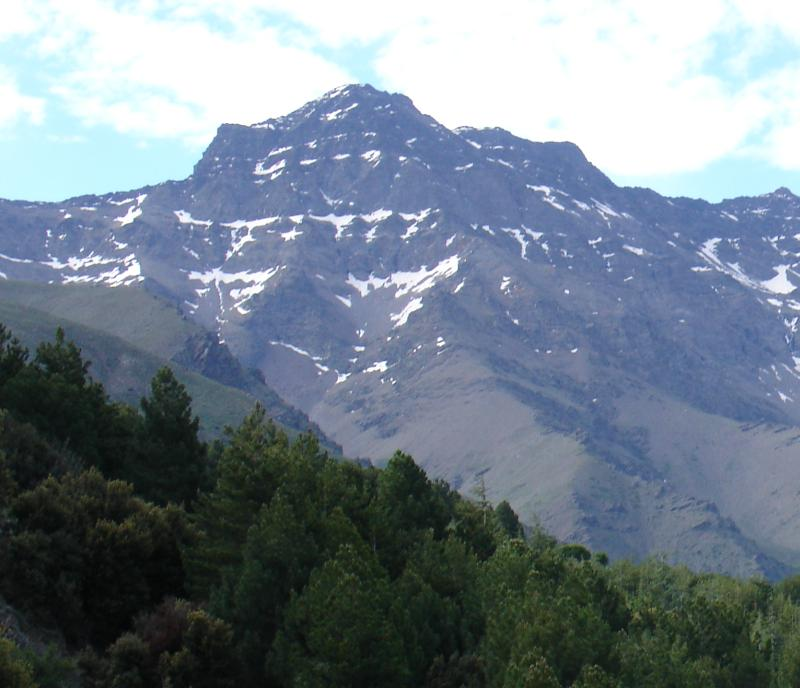
- View of Alcazaba

Highest point
- Elevation: 3,369 m (11,053 ft)
- Prominence: 186 m (610 ft)
- Listing: Mountains of Spain
- Coordinates: 37°04′02″N 03°18′05″W

Geography
- Location within Spain
- Location: Sierra Nevada, Andalusia
- Parent range: Cordillera Penibética

Geology
- Mountain type: Mica-Schist

Climbing
- First ascent: Unknown
- Easiest route: From Siete Lagunas

Alcazaba is a mountain in Spain. Standing at 3,369 m (11,053 ft), it is the third highest mountain of the Sierra Nevada range and the fifth in the Iberian Peninsula. The impressive north face can be seen from the town of Granada. The name Alcazaba derives from the word "fortification" in Arabic.

== Location ==
The mountain is located between the Mulhacén and Puntal de Vacares mountains, and is one of the most isolated places in the Sierra Nevada. Ascent requires a minimum of one night stay. Alcazaba can be accessed from any direction, but going through the north face is a technical climb. It can also be walked up from the south. There are footpath nets from the villages of Pampaneira, Bubión, Capileira and Trevélez and also from the village of Güéjar Sierra at the north side of the mountain. All the paths start an unusually long distance from the mountain. The shortest walk is about 20 km. The only sources of water are Rio Genil on the north side of the mountain, Rio Poqueira on the south west side of the Mulhacen and there are also tiny rivers on the north side of Puntal de Vacares mountain, at Prado de la Mina.

== Mountain huts ==
The most used mountain hut is the Poqueira hut at 2500 m altitude, on the western flank of the Mulhacen mountain. Poqueira hut is staffed and places are limited but can be booked in advance. From there, one can continue over the Mulhacen mountain and down to Siete Lagunas, before ascending the Alcazaba. There are also a few routes leading from Laguna Mosca through the west face, but these are physically more demanding than the south face. There is a tiny stone hut on the western side of the mountain. Refugio Campinuela is located roughly in the middle of Trevelez and Alcazaba. There is also a hut at the Cueva Secreta, approached from Güéjar Sierra. Cueva Secreta is actually a long cave providing shelter for more than 20 climbers. Some climbers also prefer the north east route, using a hut near El Real or natural caves at the Prado de la Mina. From here the remains of two volcanoes can be seen.

== Around Alcazaba and climbing ==
Alcazaba has a steep north face going straight down about 1000 m. There are two paths going through the face in the middle from west to east. These paths may have been used to collect water. Small rivers can be found at the Prado de la Mina. To the east side are three lakes under the name Lagunas de la Calderetas. At the wide top terrain are two peaks at the south side of the mountain. Siete Lagunas (the Seven Lakes) are located between Mulhacen and Alcazaba. During the summer months good hiking boots are needed, because of the walking distances involved and the nature of the terrain in this area. Alcazaba gets usually covered by snow at the beginning of December, therefore crampons and other winter climbing gear such as climbing axes are essential. There are plenty of challenges on this mountain as one can walk, scramble and climb on it. One of the features of these mountains are that they have the longest climbing season in Europe due to their southern latitude. Nights can become very cold, because of the freezing sea winds. There are usually some ibex to be seen.

== Photo gallery ==
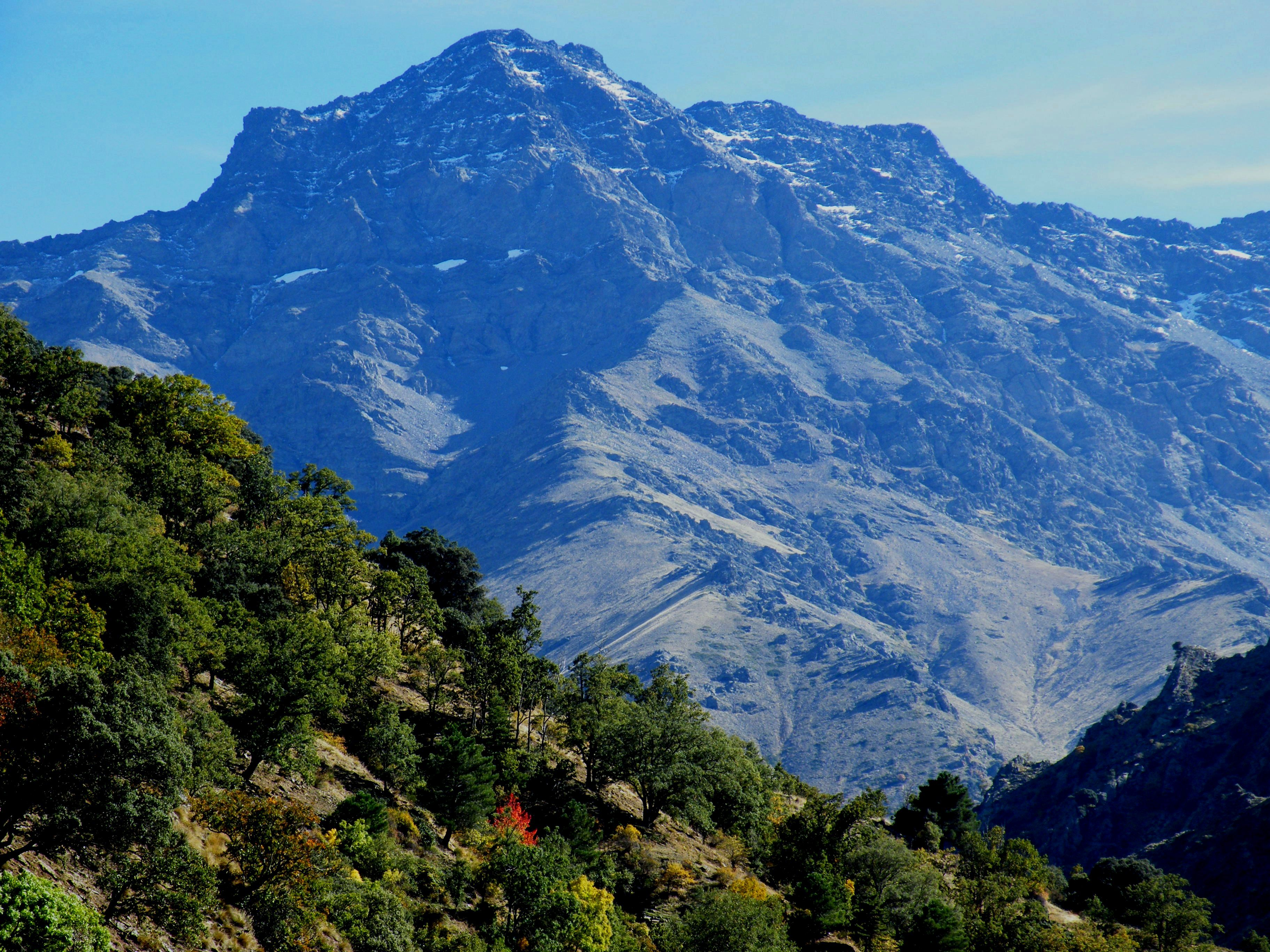
Alcazaba North Face

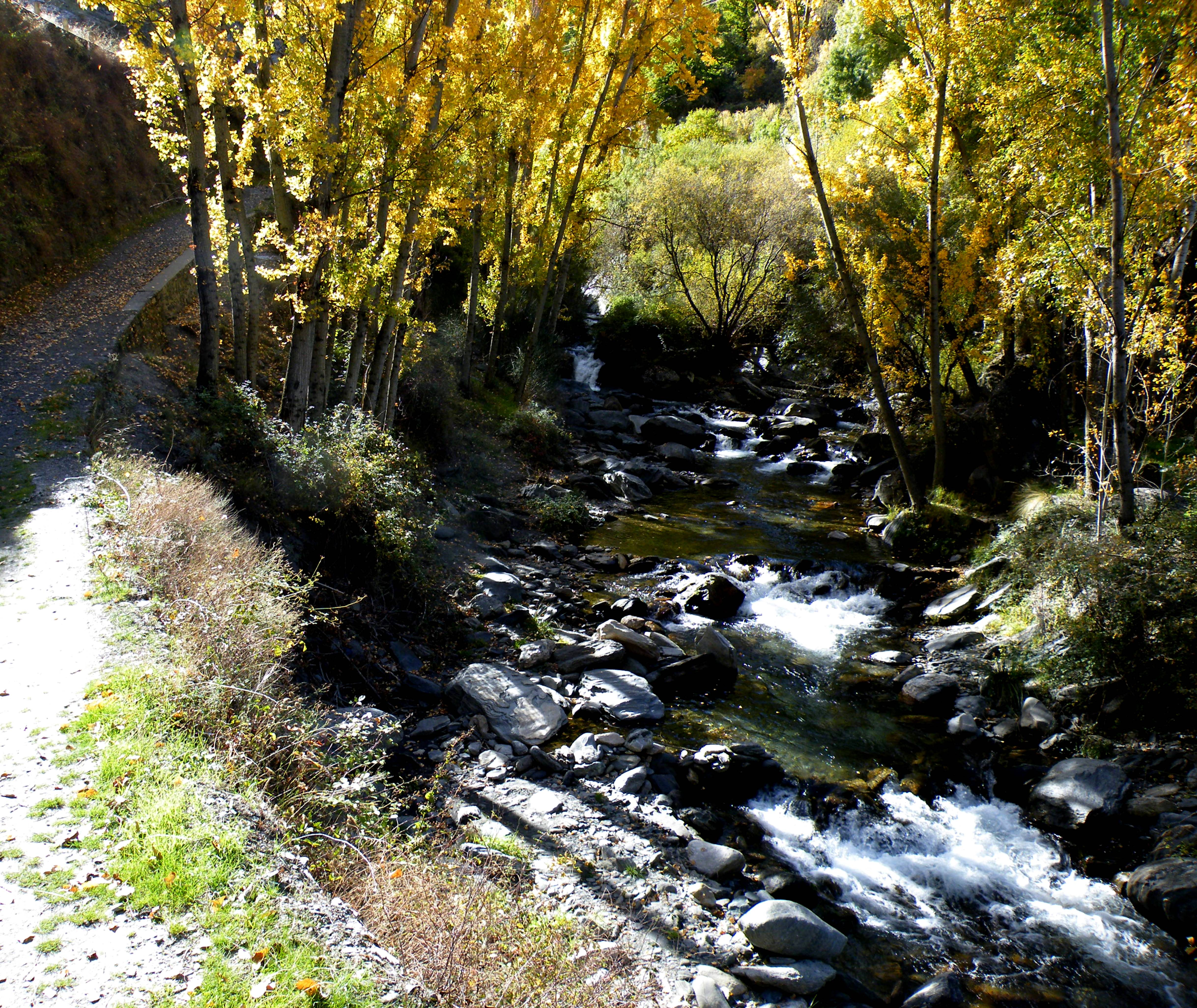
River Rio Genil

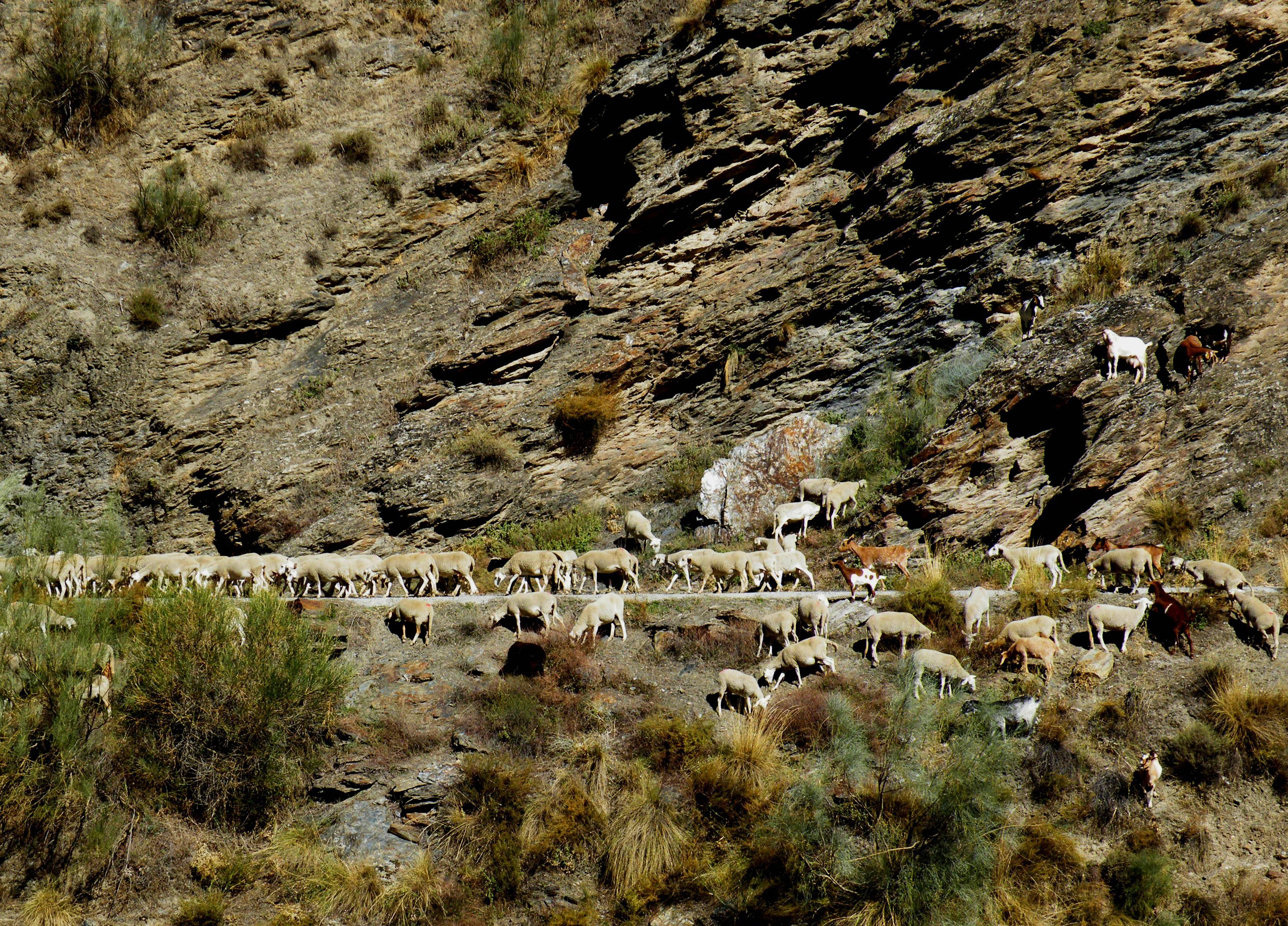
Herd of goats on mountains

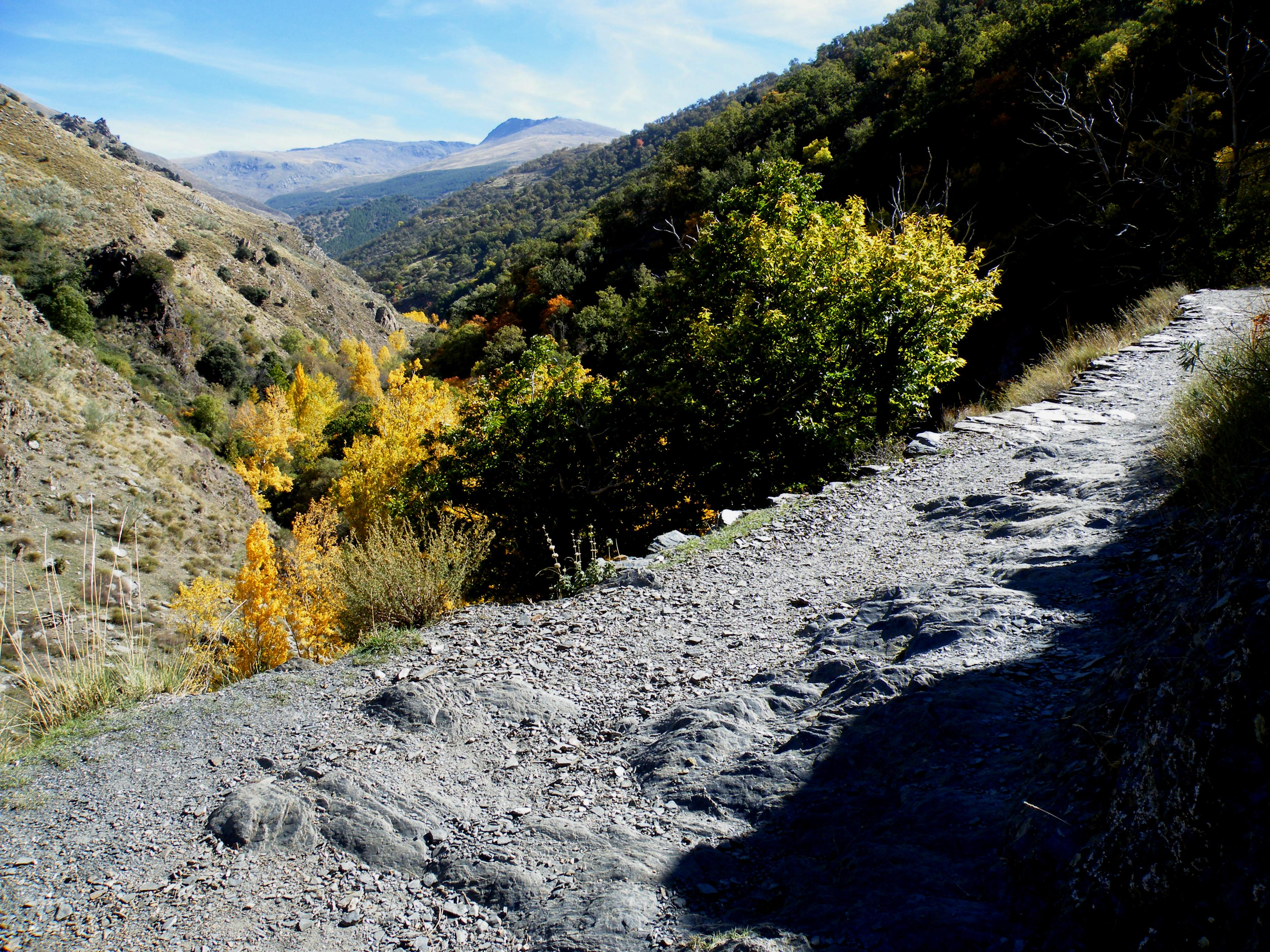
Mountain path

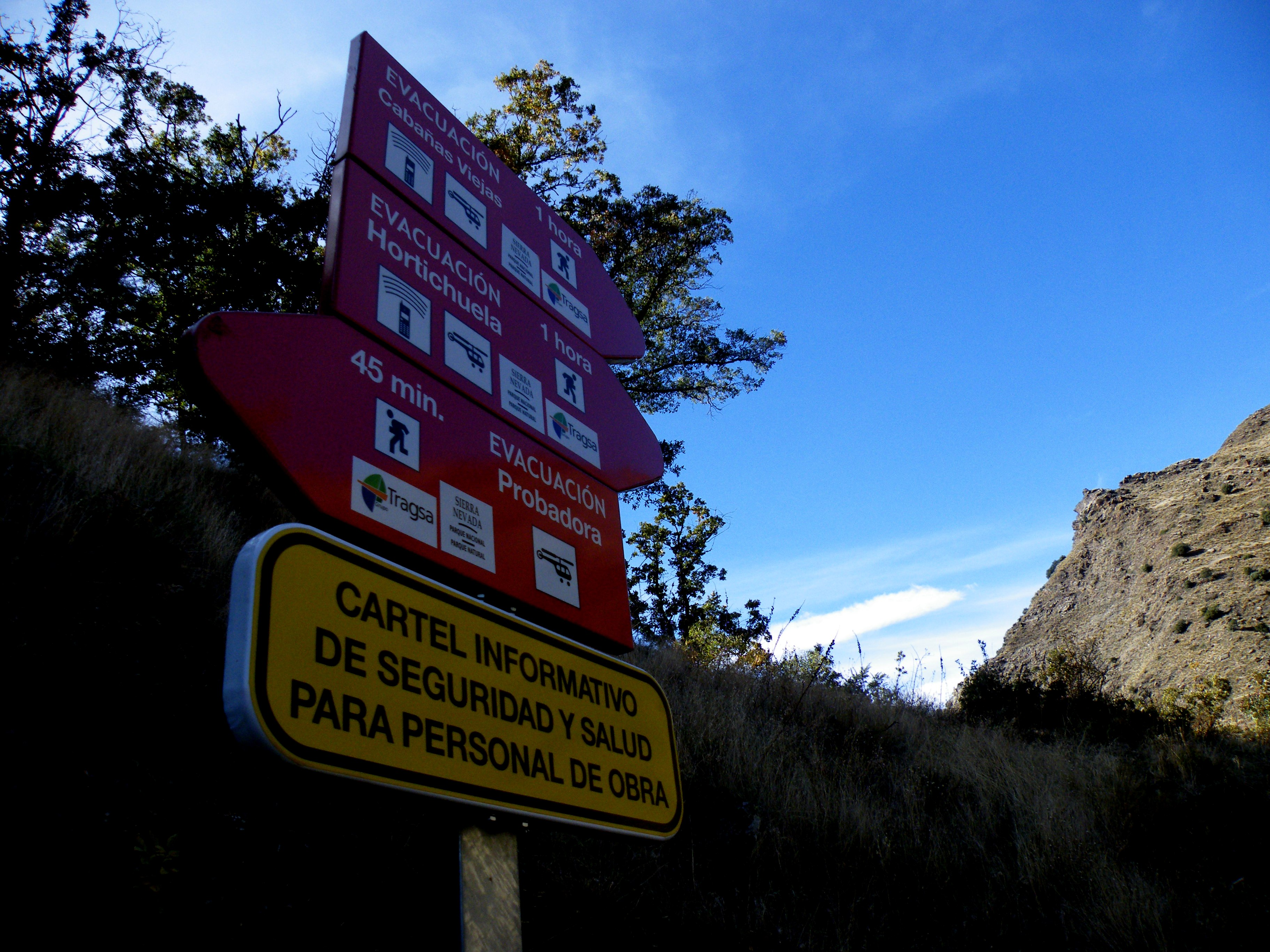
Evacuation signposting

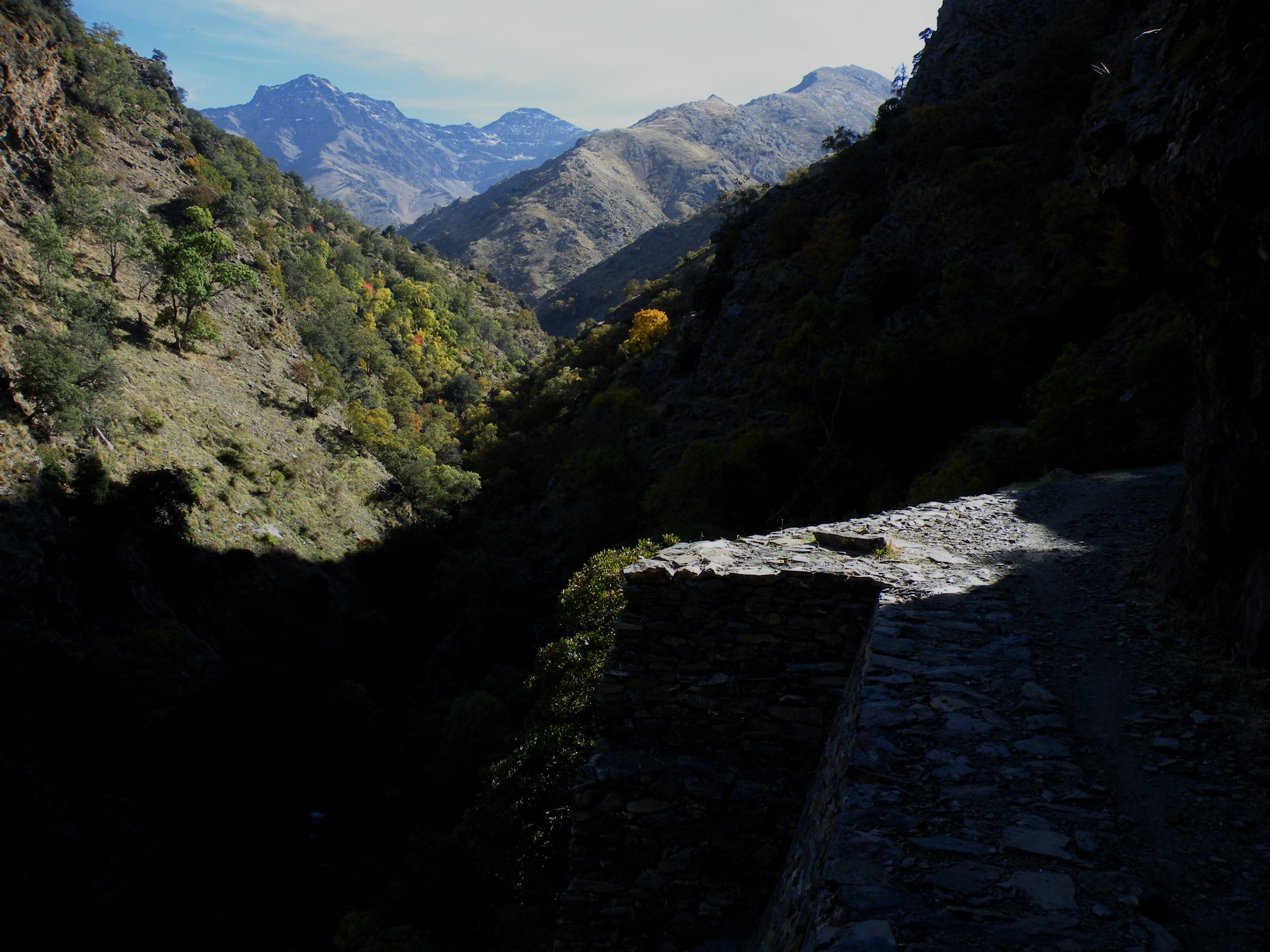
Supported footpath

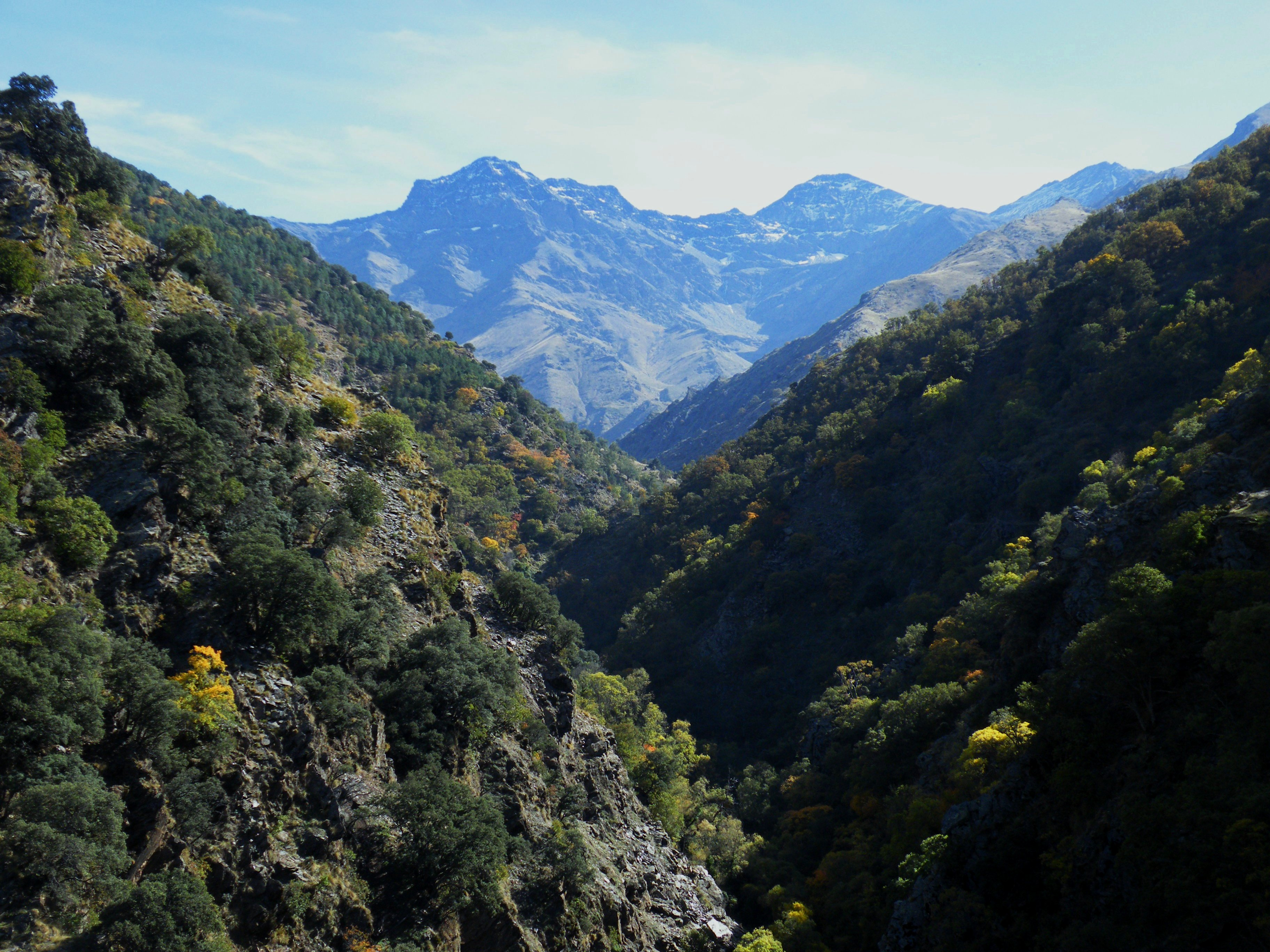
Alcazaba and Mulhacen

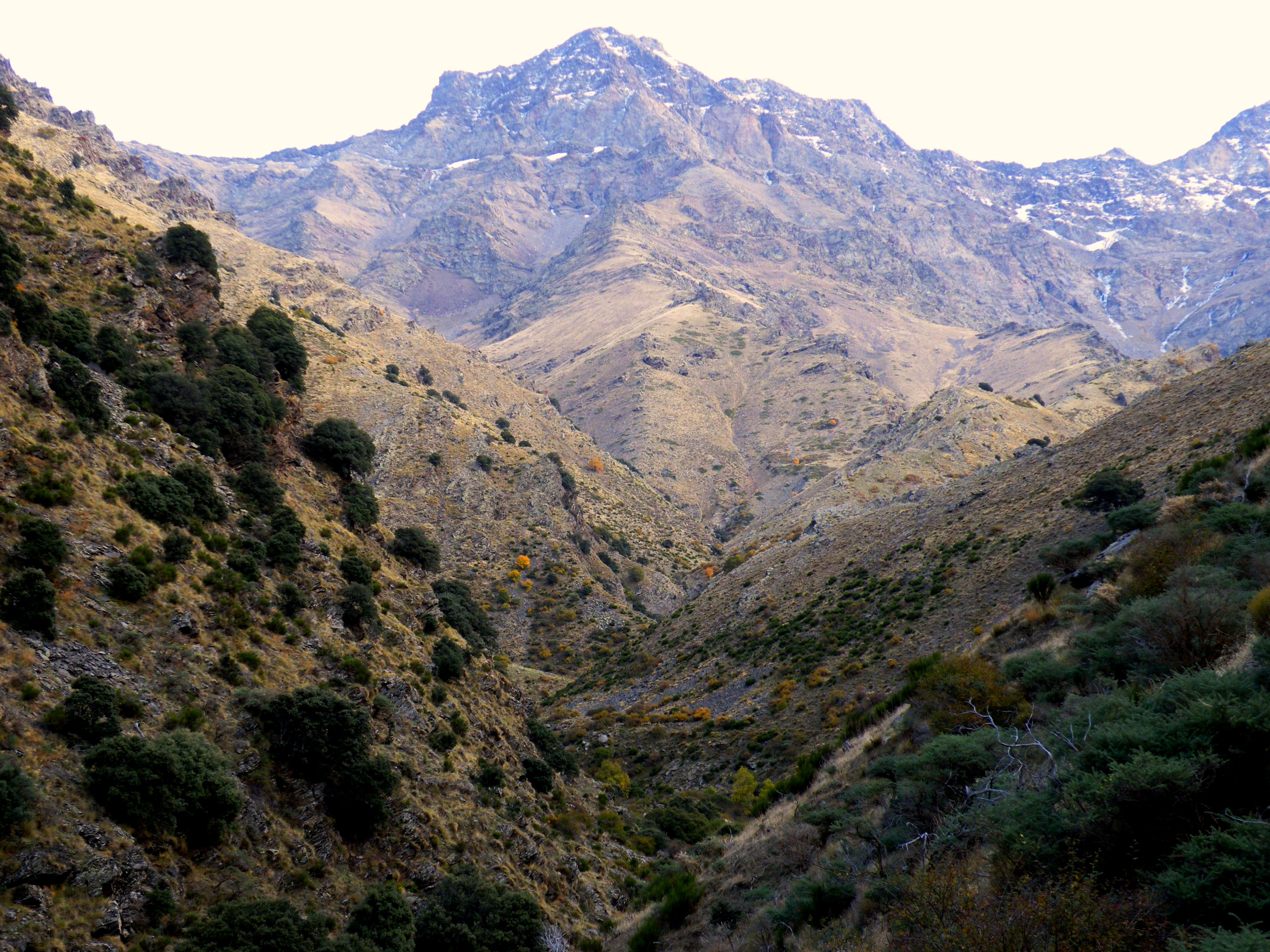
Alcazaba

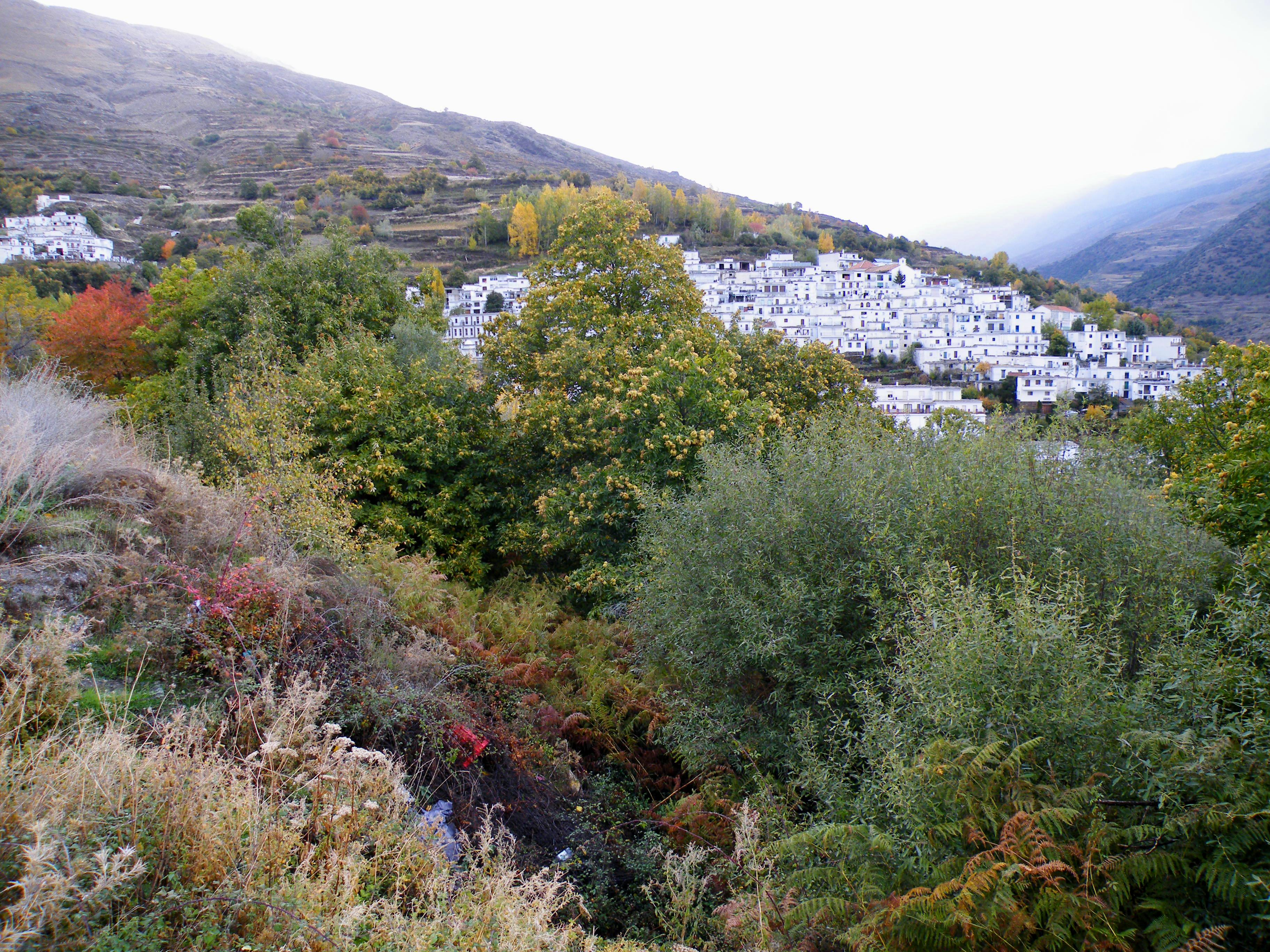
Trevelez
