= Pampaneira =

Pampaneira, Spain
- village
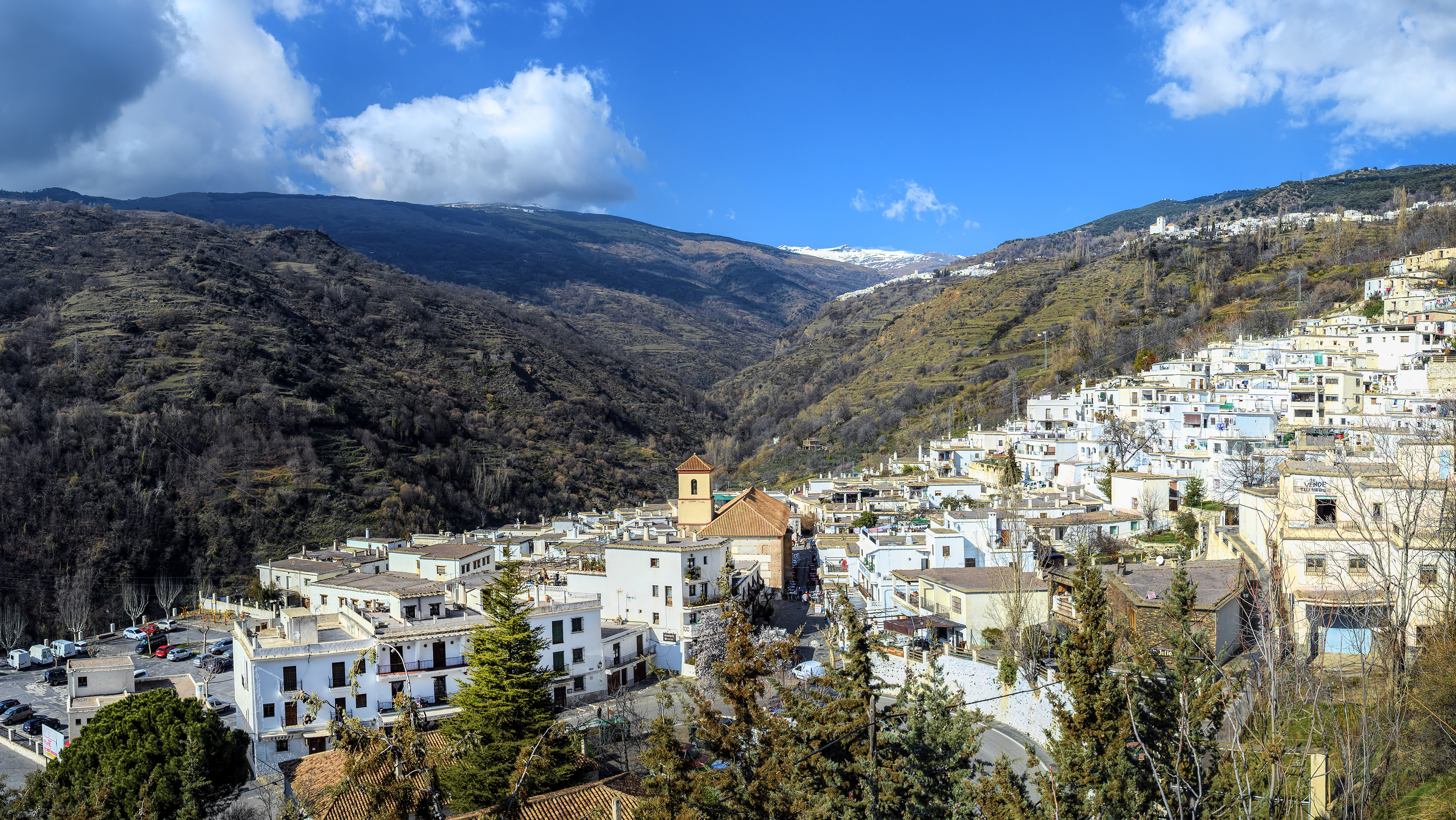

- Coat of arms

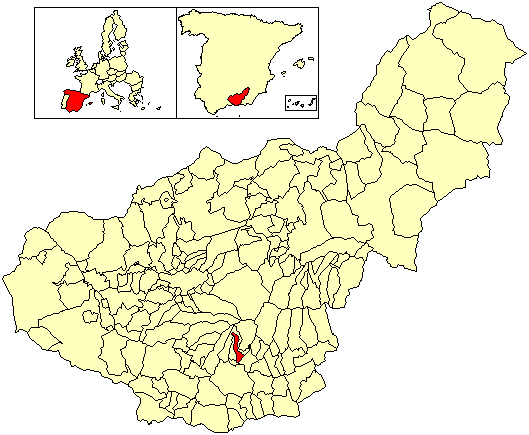
- Location of Pampaneira
- Coordinates: 36°56′N 3°21′W
- Country: Spain
- Province: Granada
- Municipality: Pampaneira

Area
  - Total: 17.47 km^{2} (6.75 sq mi)
- Elevation: 1,060 m (3,480 ft)

Population (2025-01-01)
  - Total: 312
  - Density: 17.9/km^{2} (46.3/sq mi)
- Time zone: UTC+1 (CET)
  - Summer (DST): UTC+2 (CEST)

Pampaneira is a village located in the province of Granada, Spain. According to the 2005 census (INE), the village has a population of 355 inhabitants.

It is one of three mountain villages of the Barranco de Poqueira in the Alpujarras region. The other two villages, Bubión and Capileira, are located higher in the Poqueira gorge.

The Poqueira gorge starts below the mountain peak of Mulhacén, where the river Poqueira rises. There are many opportunities for hiking in the area. Guided walks are arranged by the local tourist offices which also sell mountain hiking equipment. Other companies can plan self-guided treks through the area. The nearest major town is Órgiva. One of the highest all year-round lived-in mountain village in Spain, Trevélez is located nearby in the mountains to the east of the three villages.

Accommodation is available in all of the three villages but Capileira has the biggest range of facilities.

At the north side opens the Sierra Nevada (Spain) range with one of the highest peaks in Spain; Mulhacén and Alcazaba (Sierra Nevada).

The village is located at about 1060 metres above sea level.

There are many craft shops selling ceramics, leather and clothes. Also on offer are the locally produced specialities of cheese and ham.

During the winter the Sierra Nevada and the Alpujarra mountains get covered in snow but the villages are rarely affected by snow for more than a few days a time.

There are bus connections running every day from the town of Granada, Spain.

== Photo gallery ==
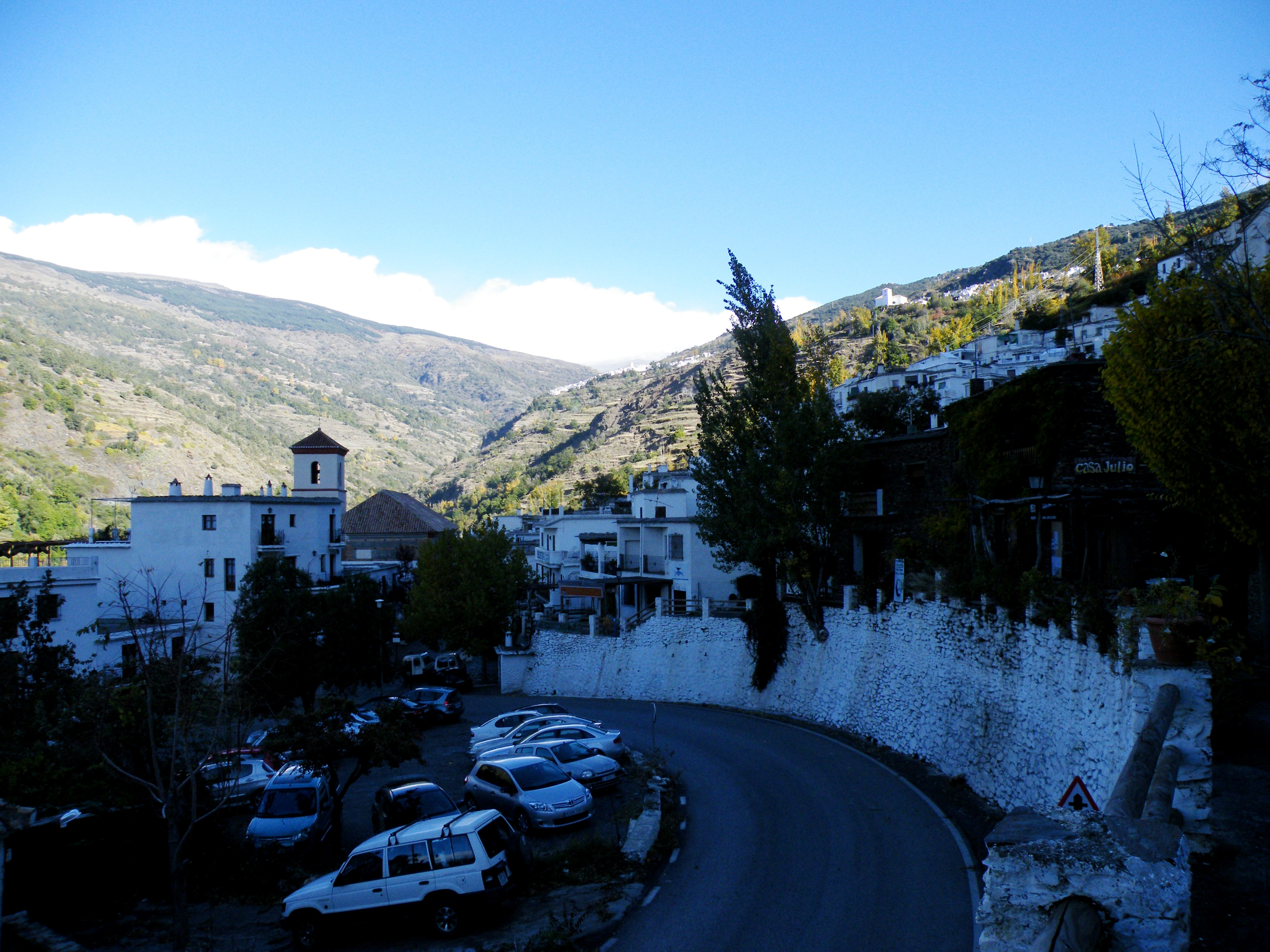
Pampaneira

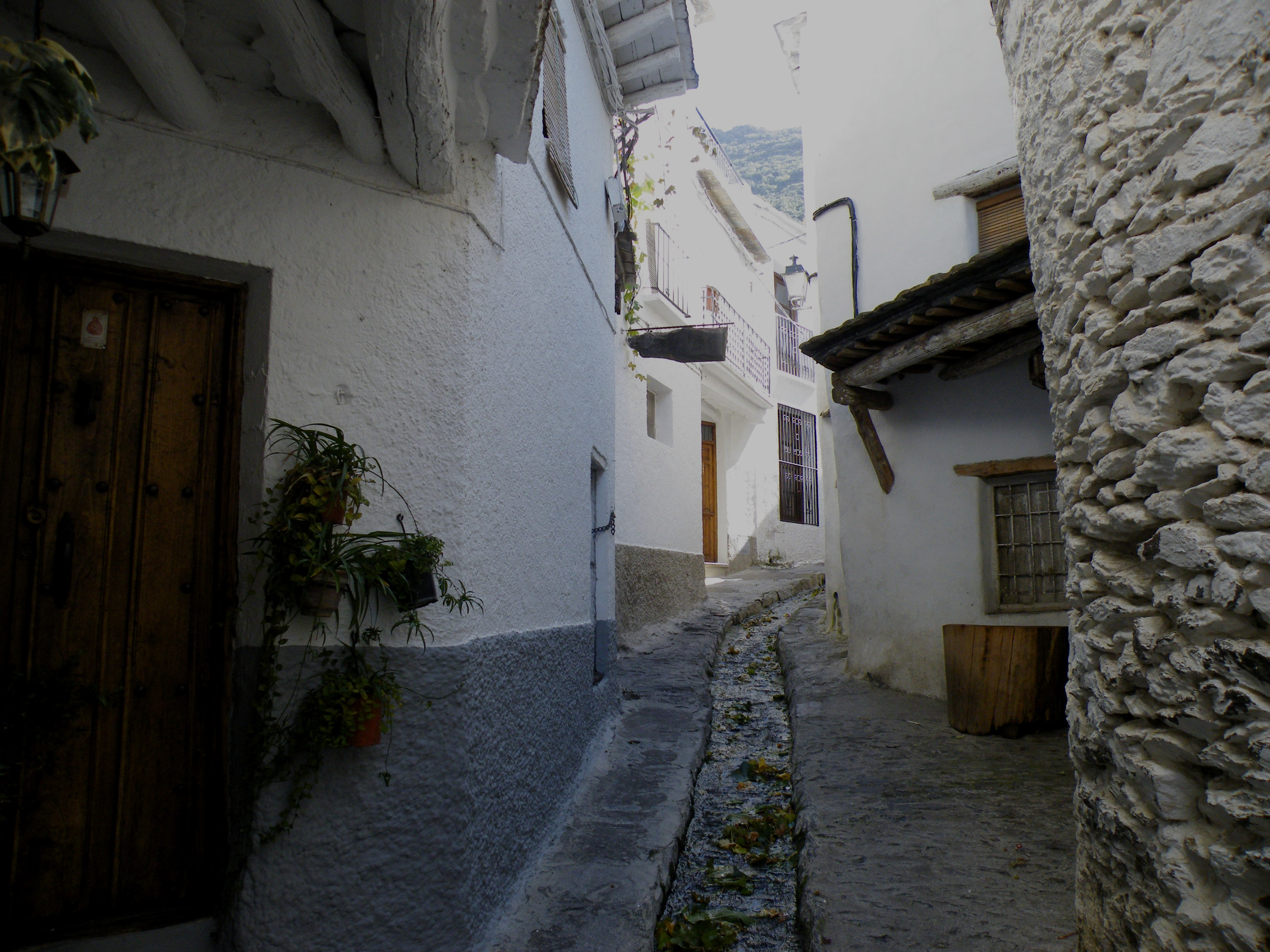
Genius water canal

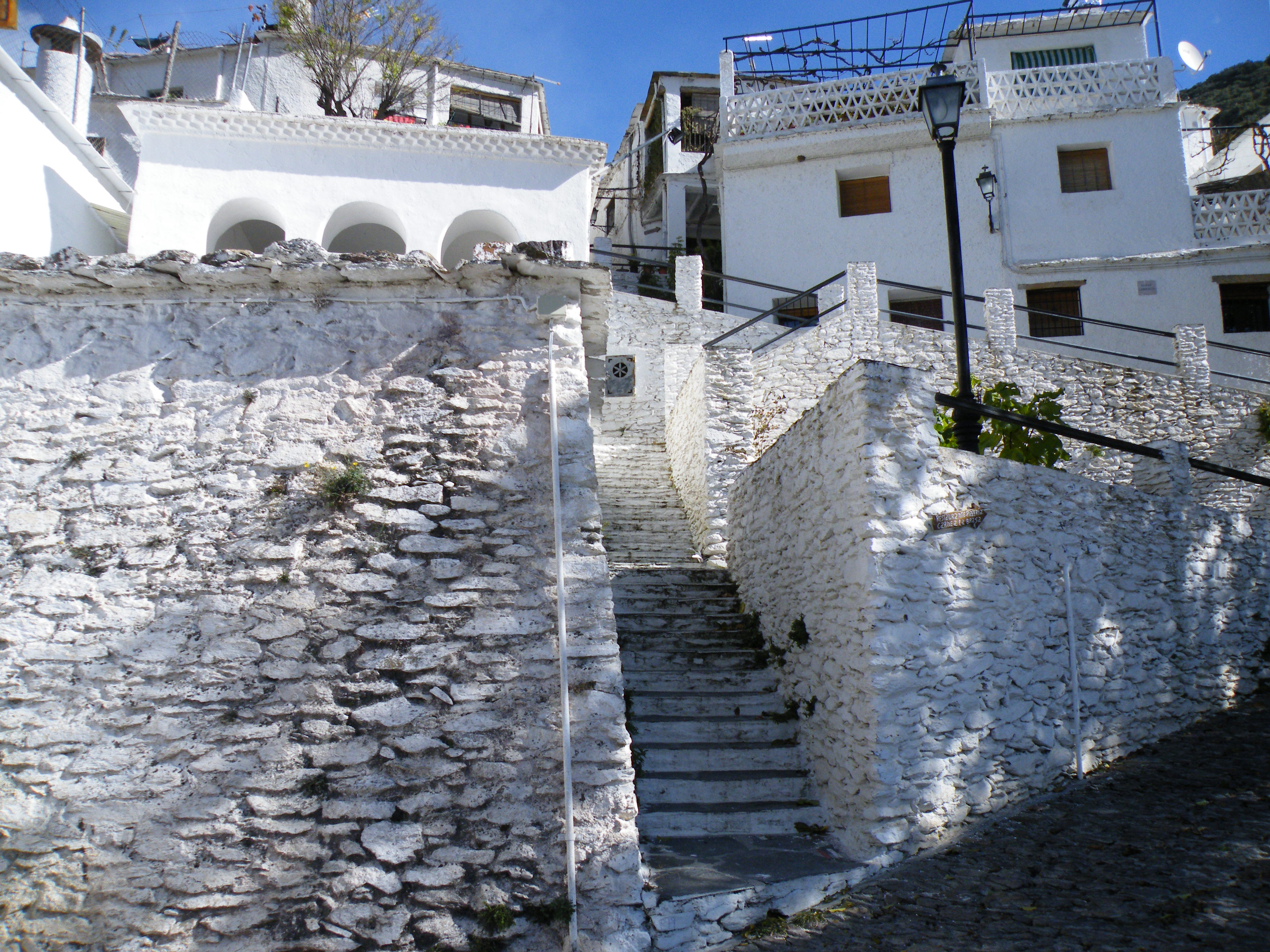
White washed village

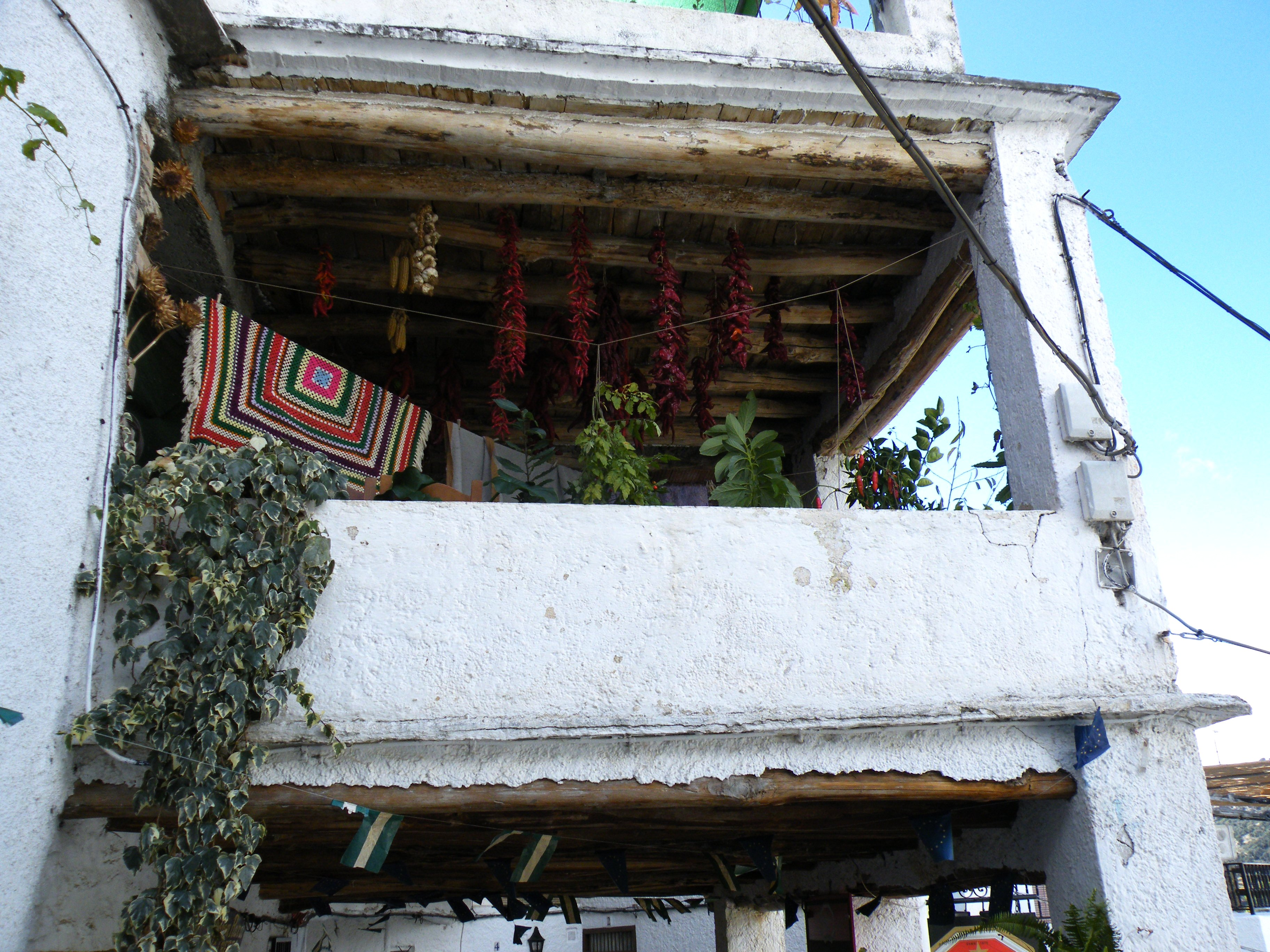
Drying of peppers & garlic

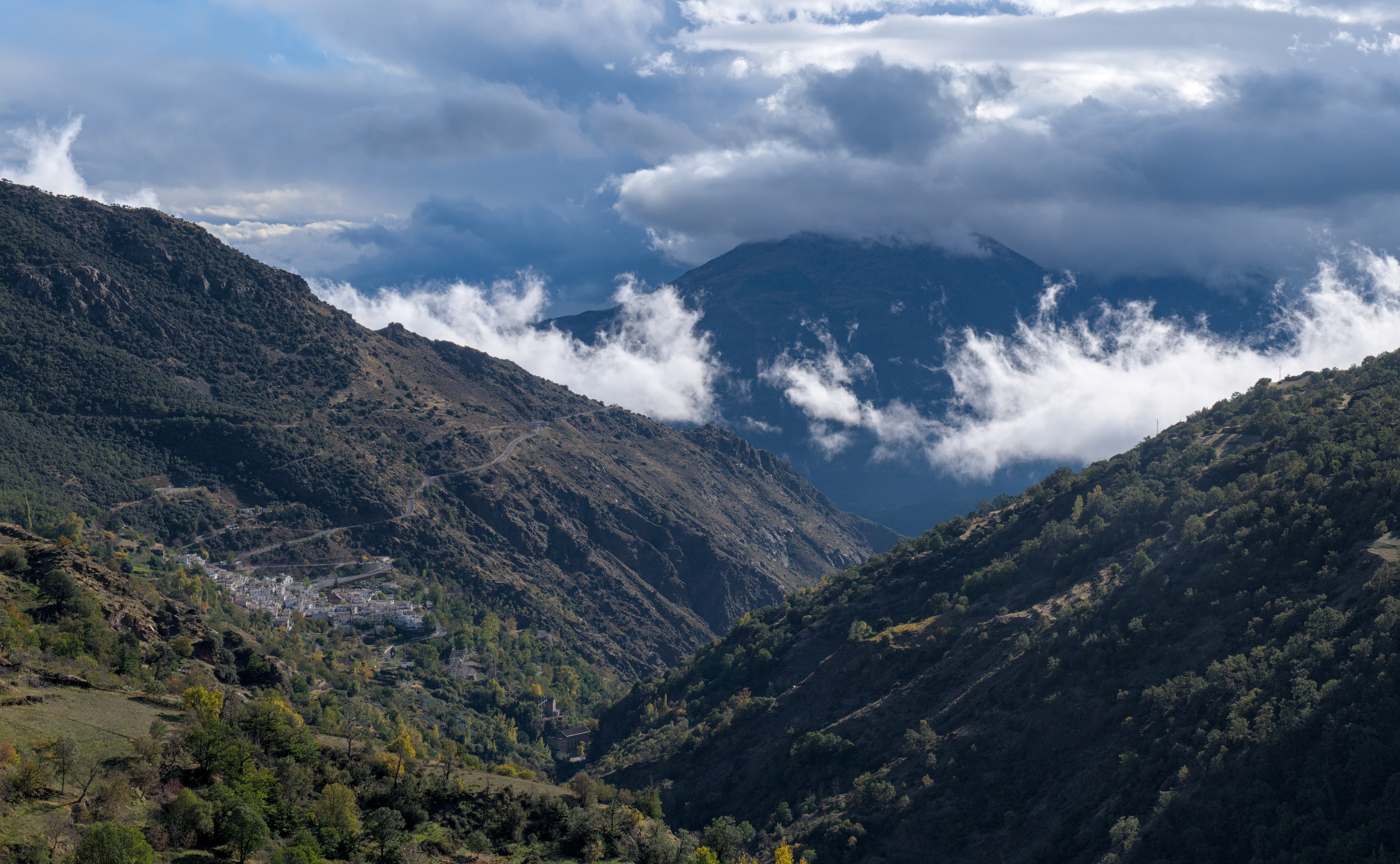
View from Capileira

== See also ==
- List of municipalities in Granada
