= Poqueira =

River in Spain

Coordinates: 36.8872°N 3.4099°W

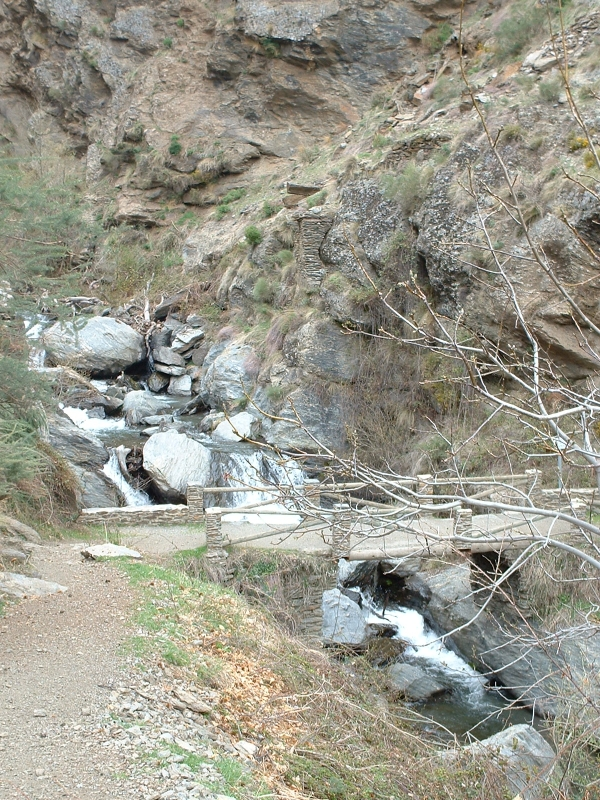
Bridge over the Río Poqueira

The Poqueira is a river in La Alpujarra region in the province of Granada, in Spain. It is formed by the confluence of streams that rise near the summit of Mulhacén, the highest peak of the Sierra Nevada mountains. The river cuts through a dramatic gorge, then joins the Río Trevélez shortly before flowing into the Río Guadalfeo.

Near the confluence there is a hydro-electric station, with the associated abandoned settlement of La Cebadilla, built to house the workers. At Pampaneira, near the bridge by which the main road from Órgiva and Lanjarón crosses the river, there is another hydro-electric installation, and just before the Poqueira river joins the Trevélez, at the narrowest point, there is a third - deep in the gorge and invisible from above.

High on the eastern side lie the villages of Capileira, Bubión and Pampaneira which have become noted touristic attractions: they are of Moorish origin, with narrow, winding streets, flat roofs, characteristic chimney-pots... On the hillsides the terraces created by the Moors can still be seen, though now they mostly lie uncultivated, and the channels also built by the Moors still bring water to the villages and terraces.

The higher part of the valley lies within the Sierra Nevada National Park, the lower part within a Natural Park; and the valley with its villages has been declared a "Conjunto Historico".

The Poqueira valley was the scene of the first major battle in the second "Morisco" rebellion, in January 1569. During the Spanish Civil War of 1936-39, the villages remained under Nationalist control, though Republican guerrilla fighters controlled the heights of the Sierra Nevada, and the frontier during most of the war lay just above the villages.

== Bibliography ==
- Bubión - the story of an Alpujarran village, by Michael Tracy (Hermitage Books, 2013, ISBN 2930590041). Follow-up comments of the author are found at https://web.archive.org/web/20130516195101/http://alpujarrabubion.net/ (retrieved 2014-08-18).
- Bubión en el centro del Poqueira, by Juan Pérez Ramón (2011).
- Capileira de Poqueira, by Miguel Estévez Callejon (1995).
- Pampaneira en la Alpujarra, by Tomás Martín Cifuentes (2009).

== See also ==
- List of rivers of Spain
