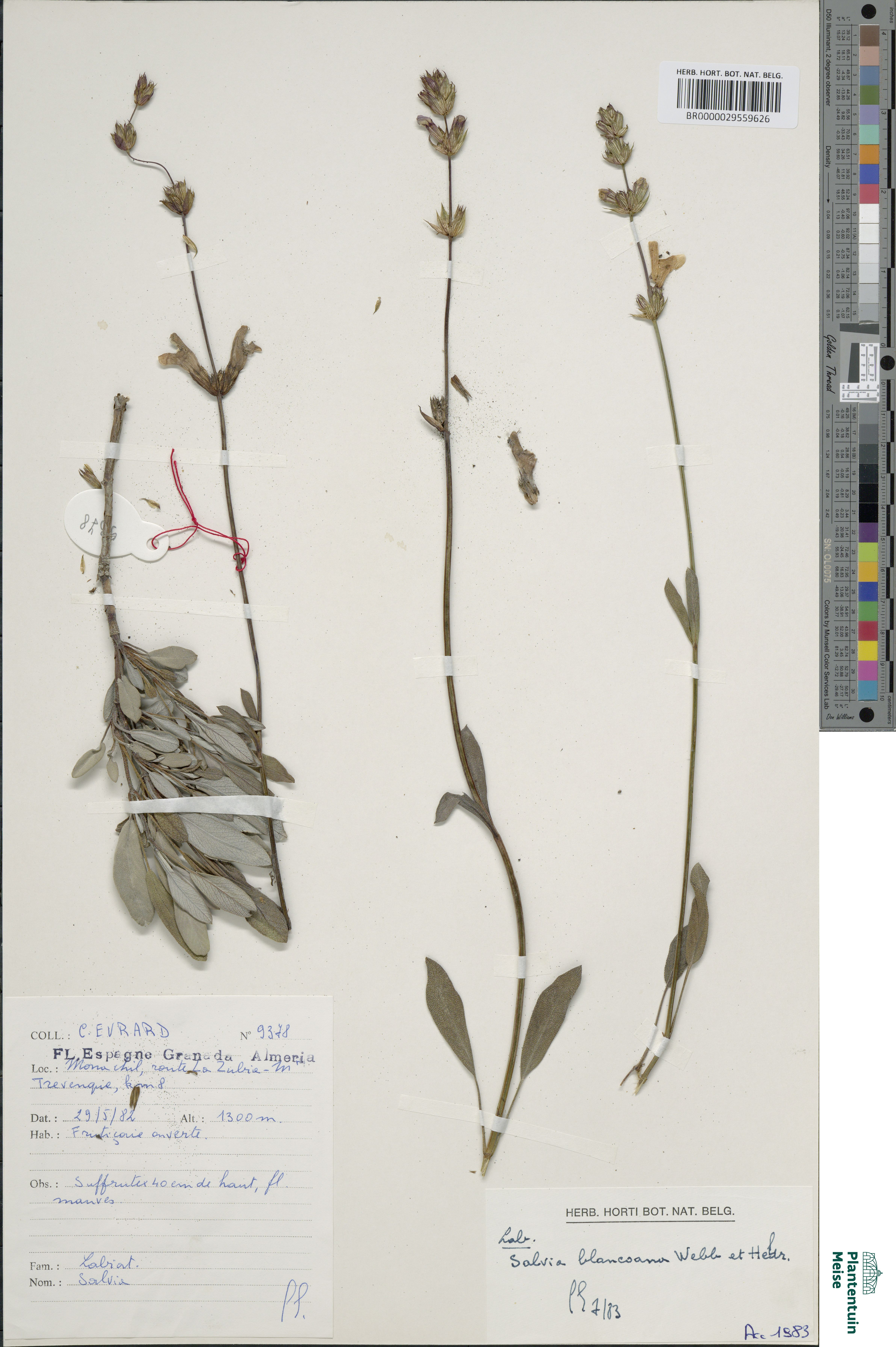

Scientific classification
- Kingdom: Plantae
- Clade: Tracheophytes
- Clade: Angiosperms
- Clade: Eudicots
- Clade: Asterids
- Order: Lamiales
- Family: Lamiaceae
- Genus: Salvia
- Species: S. blancoana

Binomial name
- Salvia blancoana Webb & Heldr.

= Salvia blancoana =

Species of flowering plant

Salvia blancoana is a flowering plant in the family Lamiaceae. It is a prostrate perennial that is native to Spain and northwest Africa. It has narrow blue-green leaves and pale violet-blue flowers. Due to its being highly variable in the wild, and because of similarities to Salvia candelabrum and Salvia officinalis subsp. lavandulifolia (syn. S. lavandulifolia), it has often been confused with those two. Current opinion gives S. blancoana distinct species status, even while some botanists consider it a subspecies of its two close relatives. It differs from S. officinalis subsp. lavandulifolia and S. candelabrum in being prostrate, as opposed to merely low-growing. It also has whorls of 2–6, compared to 6–9 in S. officinalis subsp. lavandulifolia.
