= Bubión =

- Municipality
- Coat of arms

- Location of Bubión in the Province of Granada Location of Bubión in Andalusia Location of Bubión in Spain
- Coordinates: 36°57′N 3°21′W
- Country: Spain
- Autonomous community: Andalusia
- Province: Granada
- Comarca: Alpujarra Granadina
- Judicial district: Órgiva

Government
  - Alcalde: Antonio E. Méndez Perea (PP)

Area
  - Total: 15 km^{2} (5.8 sq mi)
- Elevation: 1,350 m (4,430 ft)

Population (2025-01-01)
  - Total: 305
  - Density: 20/km^{2} (53/sq mi)
- Demonym(s): Bubionero, ra
- Time zone: UTC+1 (CET)
  - Summer (DST): UTC+2 (CEST)
- Postal code: 18412
- Website: Official website

Bubión is a village in Las Alpujarras region of Granada in Spain. It is located at latitude 36° 57' N, longitude 3° 21' W, at 1,350 metres above sea level. Its postal code is 18412. Together with Capileira (to the north) and Pampaneira (to the south) it has become a focus for the tourist trade in La Alpujarra, because of the location of the three villages on the gorge of the Río Poqueira and below the peaks of the Sierra Nevada. The three villages, with their characteristic Moorish features - narrow, winding streets, flat roofs - have been designated as a Conjunto Histórico Artístico, a region of special artistic and historical importance.

Bubión is thought to have been founded by Romans. Under the Moors, it was under the authority of Ugíjar. In the 16th century, after the fall of Granada to the "Catholic Monarchs", the village participated in the rebellions by the Moors (or "Moriscos" - Moors supposed to have been converted to Christianity). In the second rebellion, which started in December 1568, Bubión was one of the first villages of the Alpujarra to fall to the Catholic forces, after a major battle in the Poqueira valley. Following their defeat in 1571, almost all Moriscos were expelled from the province of Granada. They were partially replaced by Christian settlers from other parts of Spain.

In the Spanish Civil War of 1936-39, Bubión and the other two villages of the Poqueira valley remained under Nationalist control, although Republican forces held the surrounding heights.

The most prominent building is the village church, built in the 16th century and remodelled in the following century. It is a simple structure in the mudéjar style.

In the census of 2001 Bubión's population was given as 610, consisting of 357 "residents" and 253 "non-residents" (i.e. with a home elsewhere). A substantial number of both categories did not hold Spanish nationality, the majority of them coming from other states of the European Union. The village had 170 tourist beds.

The GR 7/E4 European long-distance footpath runs through Bubión. In addition a network of walking trails link the three white villages and the Poqueira Gorge, ascending into the Sierra Nevada and providing an approach to Mulhacén, the highest peak in continental Spain.

Bubión is served by a bus route from the city of Granada through Órgiva, continuing up the Poqueira valley to Capileira; then on through Trevelez and some further villages. There are three buses a day in each direction by Alsina Graells plus an extra bus to Orgiva on market Thursday at 9 am. A limited service is available from Motril to Orgiva.

== See also ==
"" - update of the former.

- List of municipalities in Granada
