= Alpujarras =

Natural and historical region in Granada and Almería, Spain

Coordinates: 36°56′N 03°20′W

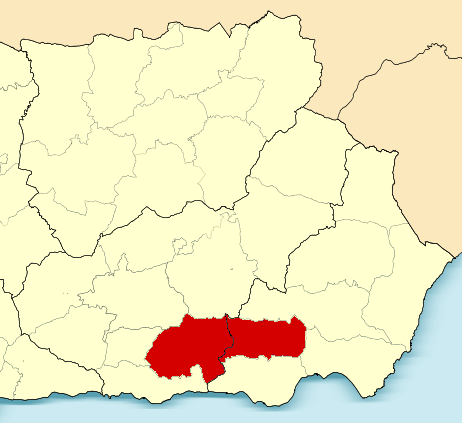
Location of las Alpujarras

The three villages of the Poqueira valley: Pampaneira, Bubión, Capileira with the Sierra Nevada in the background.

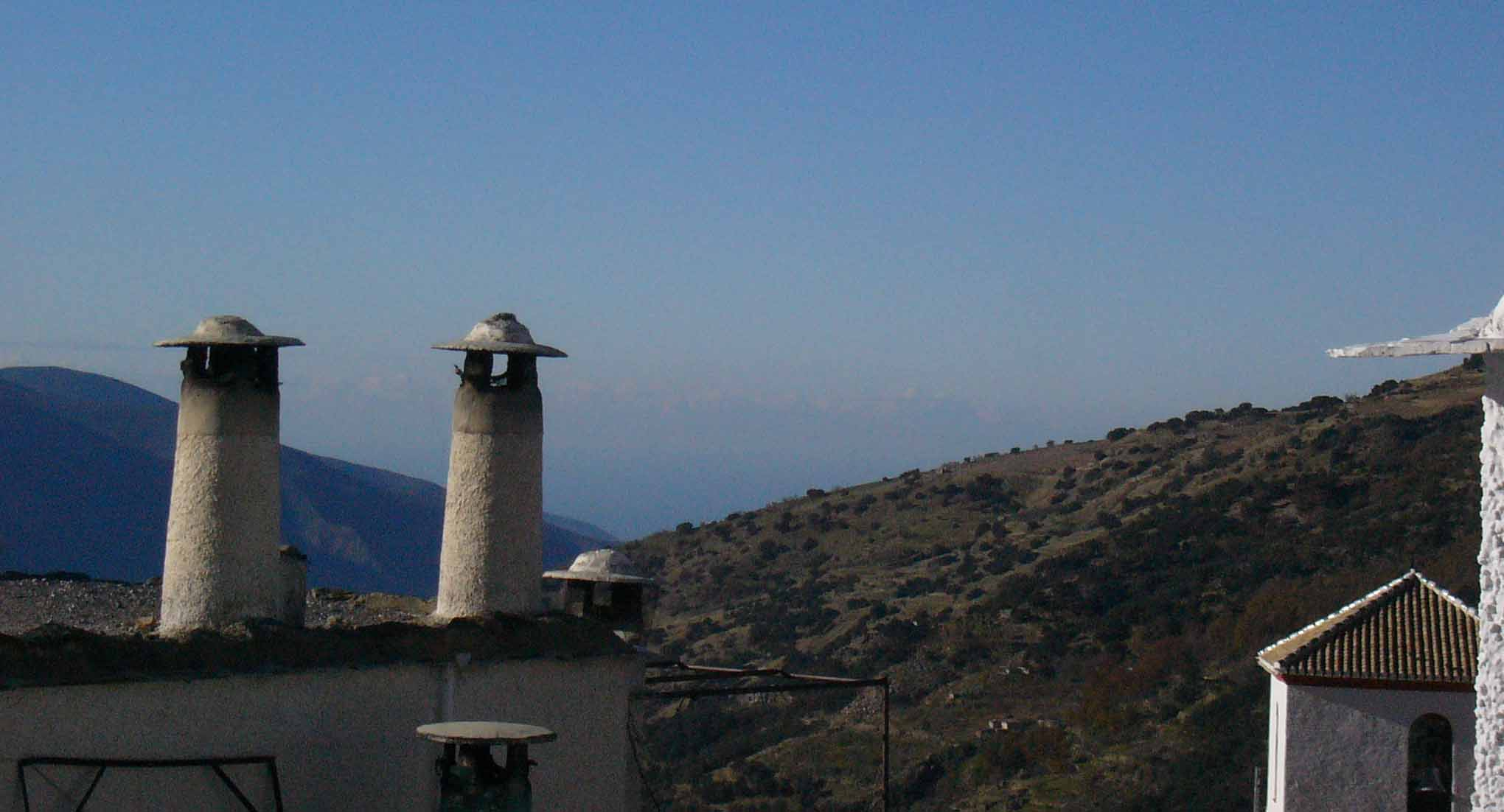
Roofs and chimneys in Bubión

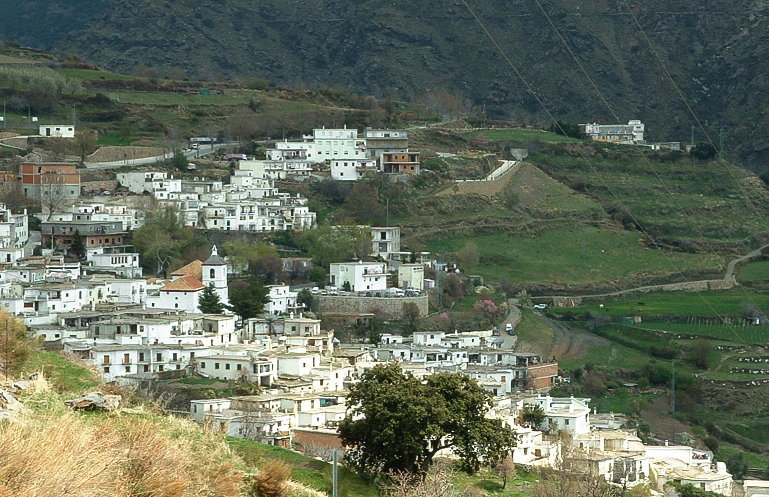
Another typical Alpujarran village, Busquístar

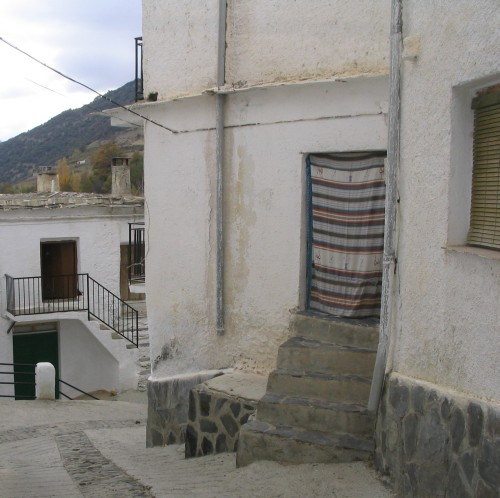
A street corner in Trevélez showing traditional architecture and door curtain

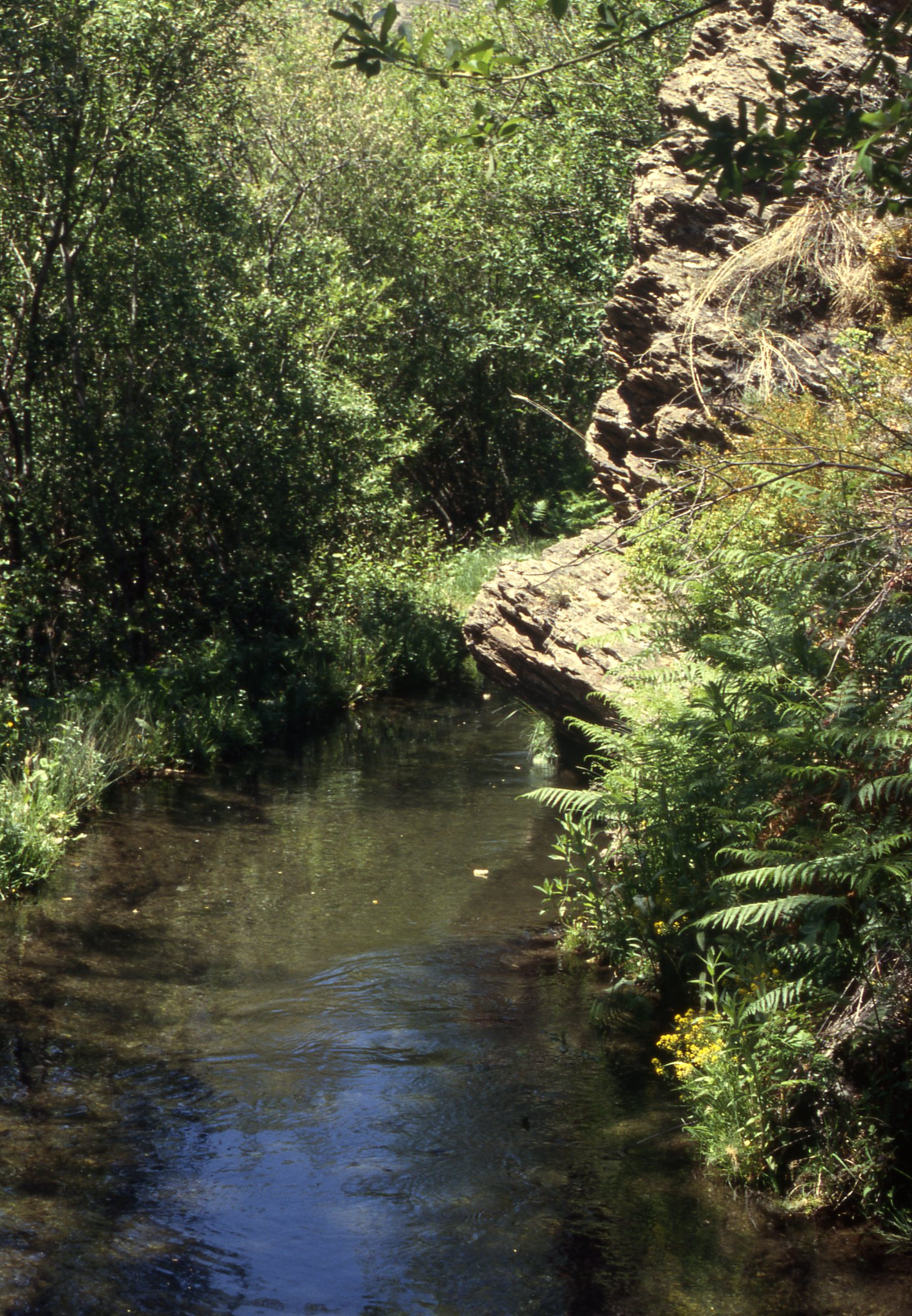
An acequia, old irrigation canal, still in use.

The Alpujarra (Spanish pronunciation: [alpuˈxara], Arabic: البشرات, romanized: al-bašarāt or al-bušarāt) is a natural and historical region in Andalusia, Spain, on the south slopes of the Sierra Nevada and the adjacent valley. The average elevation is 1,200 metres (4,000 ft) above sea level. It extends over two provinces, Granada and Almería; it is sometimes referred to in the plural as "Las Alpujarras". There are several interpretations of this Arabic-origin name: the most convincing is that it derives from al-basharāt (البَشَرَات), meaning something like "sierra of pastures". The administrative centre of the part in Granada is Órgiva, while that of the part in Almería is Alhama de Almería.

The Sierra Nevada runs west-to-east for about 80 km. It includes the highest mountain in mainland Spain: the Mulhacén at 3,479 metres (11,414 ft). The term sierra nevada implies the existence of a snow field, an accumulation of permanent snow and ice. However, in the Alpujarras most of the snow melts in the spring and summer, allowing the southern slopes of the Sierra to remain green and fertile throughout the year, despite the heat of the summer sun. Water emerges from innumerable springs; human intervention has channeled it to terraced plots and to the villages.

Olives are grown on the lower slopes, and in the valley below which extends from Órgiva to Cadiar, through which flows the Guadalfeo river. The plentiful water, milder climate, and fertile land favour the cultivation of grapes, citrus, and other fruit. There is also a developing production of wine on the hills between this valley and the sea, and almond trees thrive on its southern slopes. The eastern end of the Alpujarra, towards Ugijar in the province of Almería, is much more arid.

== Historical background ==
The terracing and the irrigation of the hillsides (the "Alpujarra alta") was the work of local Spanish Muslim people of Al-Andalus, who inhabited this area for hundreds of years after the initial Moorish conquest of 711 AD. They also created villages on the hillsides in the style to which they were accustomed in the mountains of North Africa: narrow, winding streets and small flat-roofed houses.

The Catholic "Reconquista" of Spain progressed to the extent that by 1462 only the Emirate of Granada – including the Alpujarras – was left in Muslim hands; and in 1492 the city of Granada fell to the "Catholic Monarchs". Their attempts to force Christianity on the Muslim inhabitants led to successive revolts, the Rebellion of the Alpujarras (1499–1501) and the Rebellion of the Alpujarras (1568–1571). The revolt of 1568 was a civil war, with the Spaniards deploying large forces against this rural population and with much cruelty on both sides. The revolt ended with the death of the last Spanish Muslim leader in March 1571. The revolt marked the end of Mudéjar style accommodation in Spain between and the Spanish monarchs saw as only way to deal with the Moriscos by complete Christianisation of what they felt to be an utterly alien element within the political body.

Thus, the Spanish Monarchs ordered the expulsion of the entire Muslim population from the territory of Granada, who were taken in forced marches to other parts of Spain. Only a few, considered to have genuinely converted to Christianity, were allowed to remain, so as to teach the new inhabitants the silk industry (which they were unable to maintain).

Starting in 1571, settlers were brought in from all over Spain; many came from as far away as Galicia. Though they were given various financial incentives, the re-settlement proved difficult. The population of the Alpujarra, estimated at 40,000 before the final revolt, was only about 7,000 by the end of the century.

The isolation of this mountain region caused it to remain poor and backward, until during the 20th century it was gradually opened up by improved roads. The Civil War of 1936–1939 was disastrous, as the opposing Nationalist and Republican forces fought over the area. Some villages changed hands more than once, and each time the victor exacted retribution over the vanquished. Even after the Nationalist victory in April 1939, guerrilla fighters in the mountains continued their struggle against the Guardia Civil and a locally recruited militia (Somatén) based in the villages. This conflict did not end until 1942 when the guerrilla leader was captured.

== The Alpujarra today ==
The high villages have lost population as younger people seek work in the cities, in Spain and elsewhere in the European Union. Tourism has developed as the natural environment of this area has become better known. Visitors include day-trippers or weekend visitors from Granada and longer-term tourists from northern Europe. There are bus connections with Granada and Motril; as the motorway extends along the coast, the airports of Malaga and Almeria are brought closer in time. There are also numerous foreign residents, who have also brought income and employment to the area. The villages have good-quality accommodation and shops for tourists. Serrano ham, cured in Trevélez and other high-altitude villages, is a major local product. Mountain biking and walking is provided for, and the GR 7 / E4 European long-distance footpath passes through the region.

The Sierra Nevada and most of the Alta Alpujarra is protected under various national and international schemes, ensuring that the rural and the urbanistic features are preserved. The priority now is to promote "sustainable tourism" and as far as possible to extend the tourist period.

== Bibliography ==
- Alarcón, Pedro Antonio de (1874). La Alpujarra: sesenta leguas a caballo precedidas de seis en diligencia. The first description of a visit to the Alpujarras by a modern author.
- Brenan, Gerald (1957). South From Granada. A description of the author's seven-year stay in Yegen in the 1920s.
- Byskof, Else (2014). On Foot in Andalucía: 40 Hiking Excursions in Southern Spain. CreateSpace Independent Publishing Platform. ISBN 1-4961-1818-9.
- Harvey, L. P. (15 September 2008). Muslims in Spain, 1500 to 1614. University of Chicago Press. ISBN 978-0-226-31965-0.
- Stewart, Chris (1999). Driving Over Lemons: An Optimist in Andalucía.
- Tracy, Michael (2013). Bubión: The Story of an Alpujarran Village. Hermitage Books. ISBN 2930590041. Provides historical background, description of local customs, discussion of current issues, and an extensive bibliography.
