= Capileira =

- Municipality
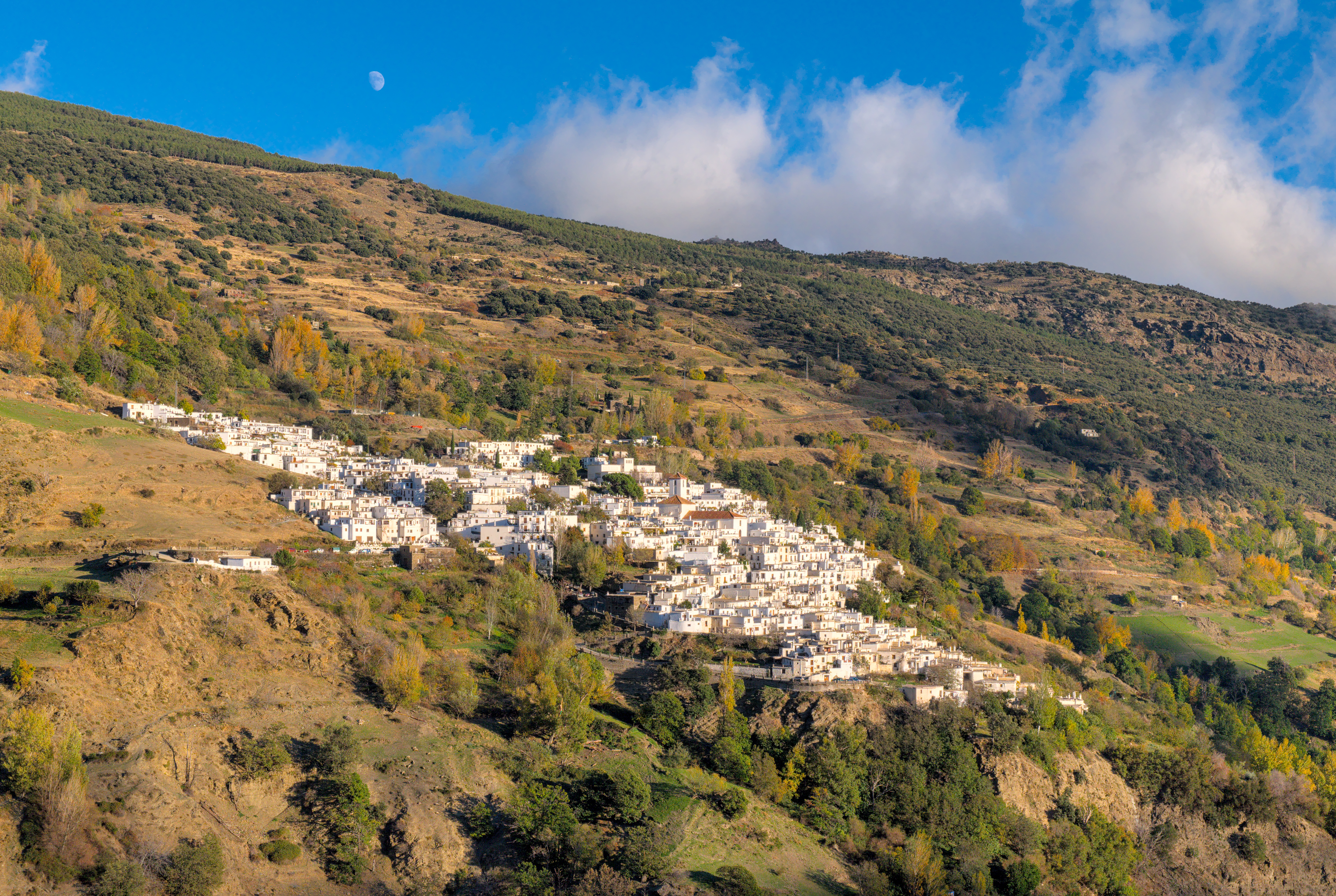

- Flag Coat of arms

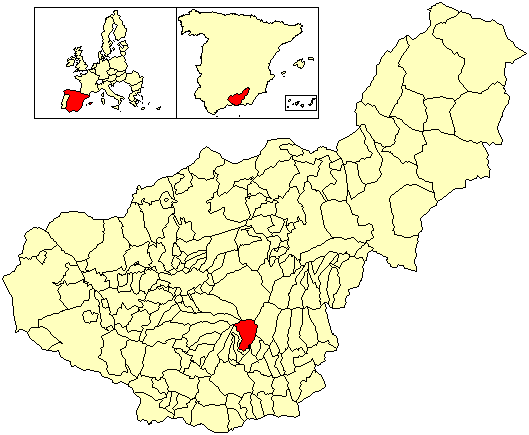
- Location of Capileira

- Location in Spain
- Coordinates: 36°57′N 3°21′W
- Country: Spain
- Autonomous community: Andalusia
- Province: Granada
- Comarca: Alpujarras
- Judicial district: Órgiva

Government
  - Alcalde: José Castillo Vázquez (2007) (PSOE)

Area
  - Total: 57 km^{2} (22 sq mi)
- Elevation: 1,436 m (4,711 ft)

Population (2025-01-01)
  - Total: 590
  - Density: 10/km^{2} (27/sq mi)
- Demonym(s): Capilurrio, -a
- Time zone: UTC+1 (CET)
  - Summer (DST): UTC+2 (CEST)
- Postal code: 18413

Capileira is the highest and most northerly of the three villages in the gorge of the Poqueira river in the La Alpujarra district of the province of Granada, in Spain. It is located at latitude 36° 57' N and longitude 3° 21' W, about 1 km north of Bubión. Its altitude is officially recorded as 1436 metres, though there is a considerable altitude difference between the oldest part of the village, which is at the lower, southern end, and the highest part, where tourist-oriented development is currently concentrated. The area of the municipality is 57 km^{2}.

Although the Sierra Nevada Highway runs through Capileira and out across the Sierra Nevada towards the city of Granada, motor traffic is no longer permitted to continue across the mountains; Capileira is therefore the highest village that public traffic can reach on the now-closed road in the summer. A track leads northwards from the village to the abandoned settlement of La Cebadilla, built to house the workers who developed the hydro-electric installation at the upper end of the Poqueira Gorge.

Capileira has developed a significant tourist trade, acting as a centre for walking and for accessing the mountains, especially Mulhacén. A bus route connects the village to Granada (via Lanjarón and Órgiva) and Alcútar (via Trevélez and Juviles)as of 2011. The village has restaurants, a market on Saturdays, and hotels, but retains a typical Alpujarran character. Its population in 2005 was recorded as 582 people. The village has a primary school but no secondary school.

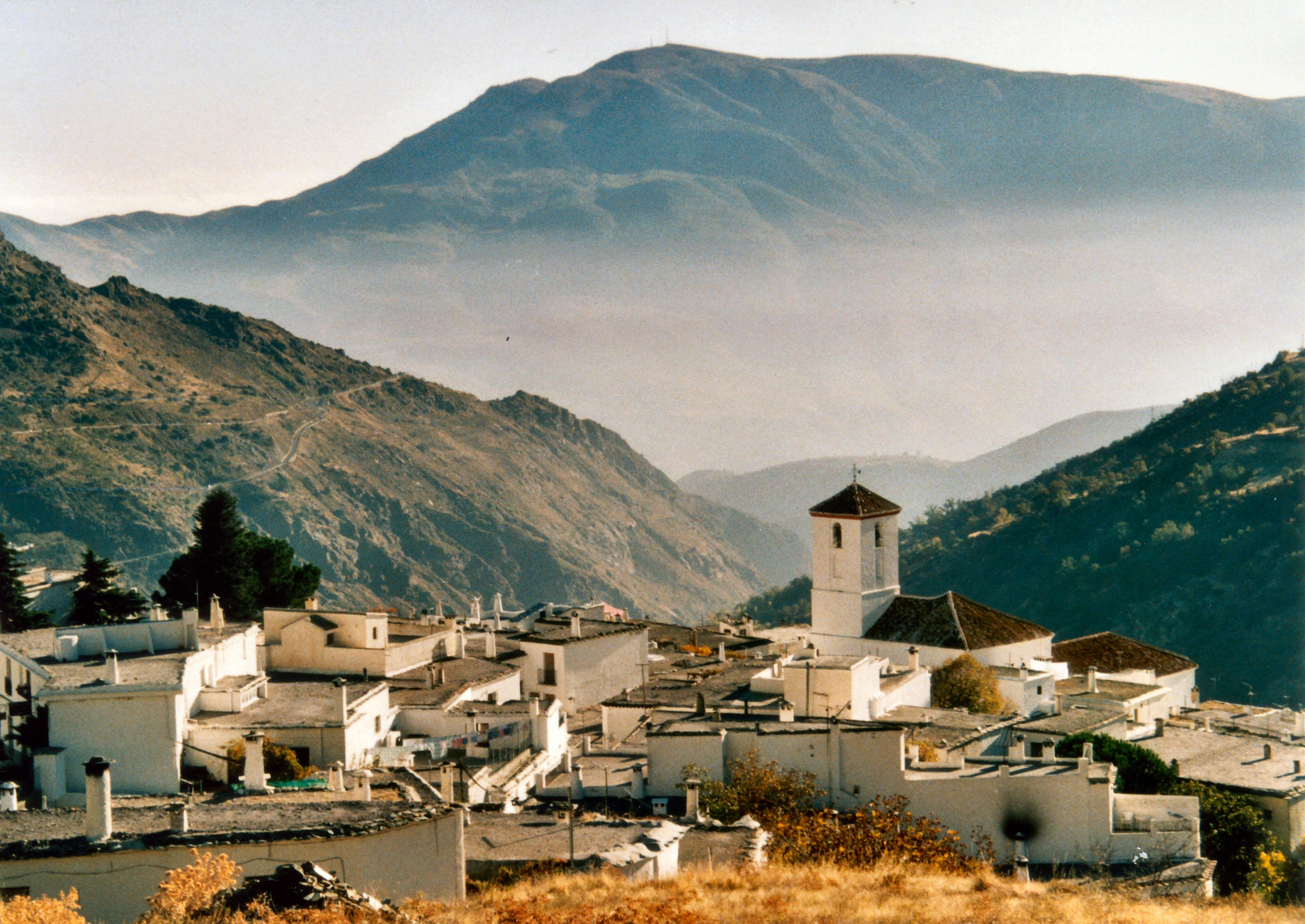
Capileira village

== See also ==
- List of municipalities in Granada
