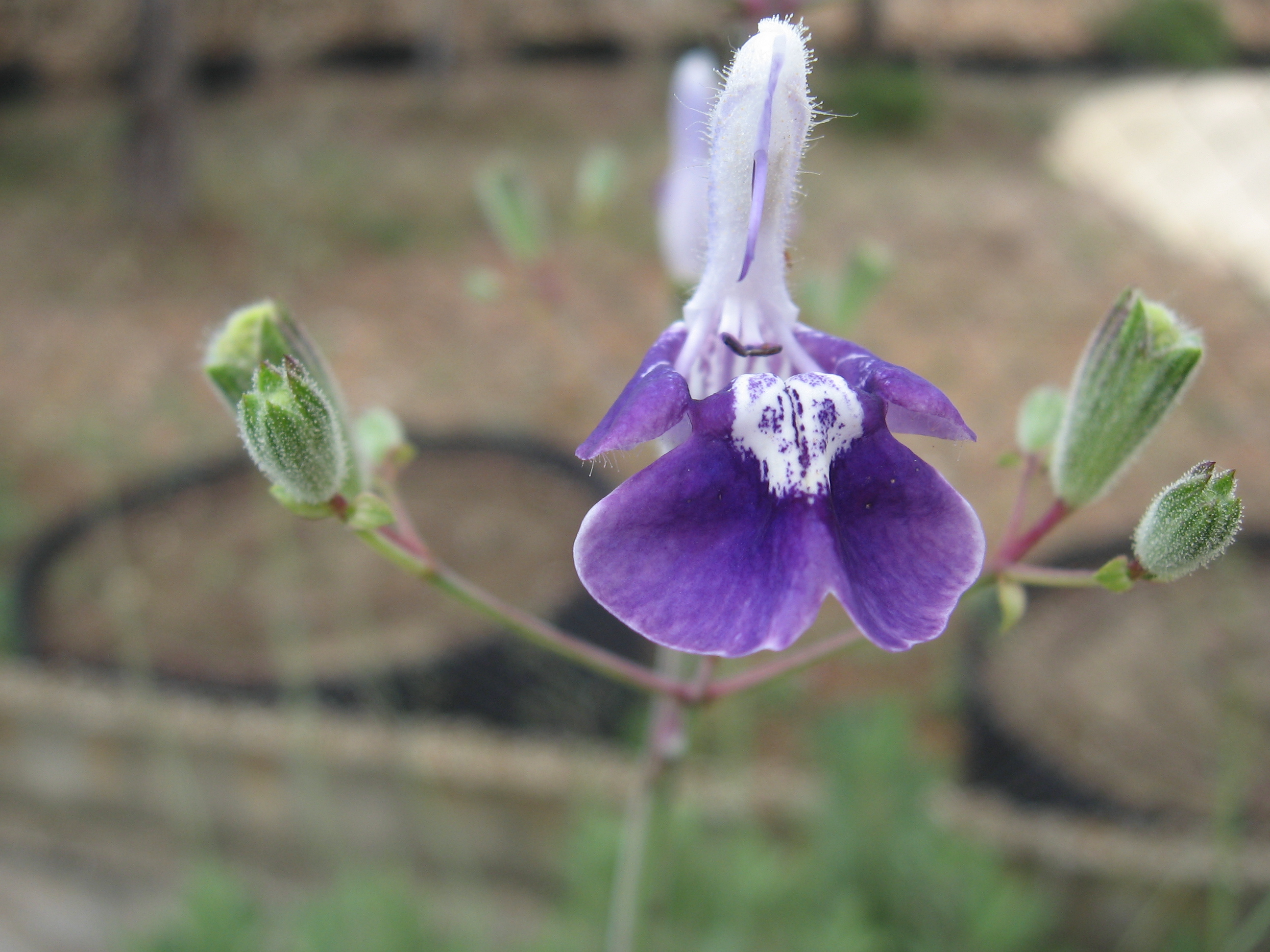

Conservation status
- Least Concern (IUCN 3.1)

Scientific classification
- Kingdom: Plantae
- Clade: Tracheophytes
- Clade: Angiosperms
- Clade: Eudicots
- Clade: Asterids
- Order: Lamiales
- Family: Lamiaceae
- Genus: Salvia
- Species: S. candelabrum

Binomial name
- Salvia candelabrum Boiss. (1838)

Synonyms
- Salvia candelabriformis St.-Lag.

= Salvia candelabrum =

Species of plant in the mint family

Salvia candelabrum is a species of flowering plant in the family Lamiaceae, native to southern Spain. It is a woody-based perennial growing to 100 cm (39 in), with woolly grey-green leaves that resemble those of the common sage, S. officinalis, and emit a similar scent when crushed. In summer it bears violet-blue flowers on branching stems held high above the foliage.

Diterpenes have been isolated from its green tissues. From the aerial parts of Salvia candelabrum have been isolated β-sitosterol, nepeticin (lup-20(29)-ene-3j,lla-diol), candelabrone (11,12,14-trihydroxy-8,11,13-abietatriene-3,7-dione), the rearranged abietane diterpenoids candesalvone A (11,12,14-trihydroxy-19(4→3)-abeo-3,8,11,13-abietatetraen-7-one) and candesalvone B (11,12,14-trihydroxy-7-oxo-3,4-seco-4(18),8,11,13-abietatetraen-3-oic acid), and large amounts of ursolic and oleanolic acids. The root bark afforded 7α-acetoxyroyleanone, 12-O-methypisiferic acid and sugol.

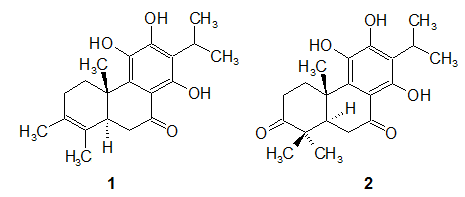
Candesalvone A (1) and candelabrone (2)

This plant has ornamental value in the garden, and has gained the Royal Horticultural Society's Award of Garden Merit.

== Etymology ==
Salvia comes from Latin and means 'healer' and is a cognate of the word 'salve'.

Candelabrum means 'candle-tree' or 'branched like a candelabra'.
