= Sierra Nevada (Spain) =

Mountain range in southern Spain

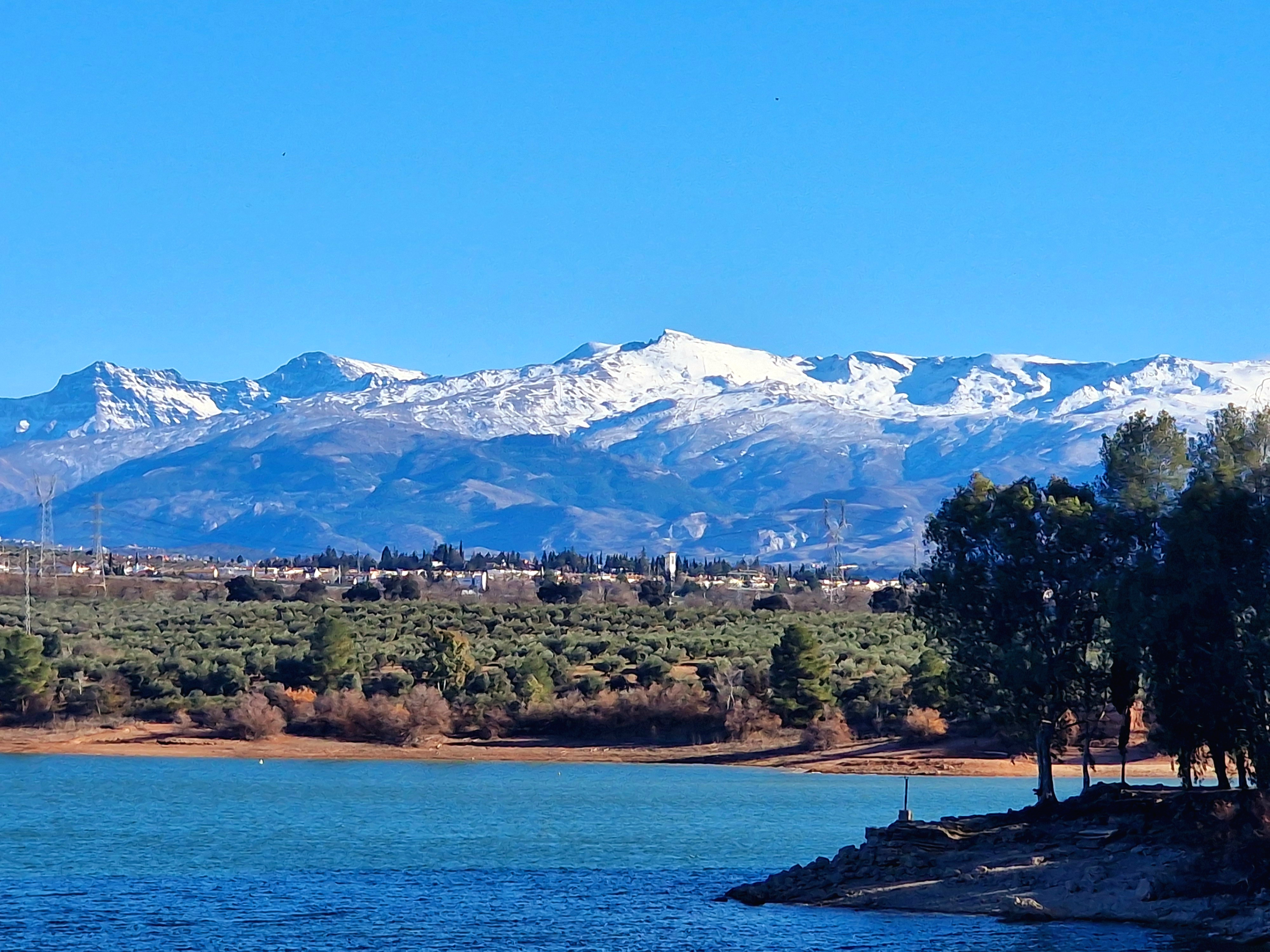
- View of Sierra Nevada from the Cubillas Reservoir

Highest point
- Peak: Mulhacén
- Elevation: 3,479 m (11,414 ft)
- Coordinates: 37°3′12″N 3°18′41″W

Geography
- Location within Spain
- Country: Spain
- Region: Andalusia
- Provinces: Granada, Almería and Málaga
- Parent range: Penibaetic System

Geology
- Rock age: Tertiary
- Mountain type: Alpine

Sierra Nevada (Spanish: [ˈsjera neˈβaða]; meaning "snow-covered mountain range") is a mountain range in the Andalusian provinces of Granada and Almeria in Spain. It contains the highest point of continental Spain: (Note: The highest peak in Spanish territory is Teide on the island of Tenerife in the Canary Islands, which is outside of continental Spain.) Mulhacén, at 3,479 metres (11,414 ft) above sea level.

It is a popular tourist destination, as its high peaks make skiing possible in one of Europe's most southerly ski resorts, in an area along the Mediterranean Sea predominantly known for its high temperatures and abundant sunshine. At its foothills is found the city of Granada, and a little further south, Almería and Motril.

Parts of the range have been included in the Sierra Nevada National Park. The range has also been declared a biosphere reserve. The Sierra Nevada Observatory, the Calar Alto Observatory, and the IRAM 30m telescope are located on the northern slopes at an elevation of 2,800 metres (9,200 ft).

== Formation ==
Sierra Nevada was formed during the Alpine Orogeny, a mountain-building event that also formed the European Alps to the east and the Atlas Mountains of northern Africa across the Mediterranean Sea to the south. The Sierra as observed today formed during the Paleogene and Neogene Periods (66 to 1.8 million years ago) from the collision of the African and Eurasian continental plates.

== Geography ==
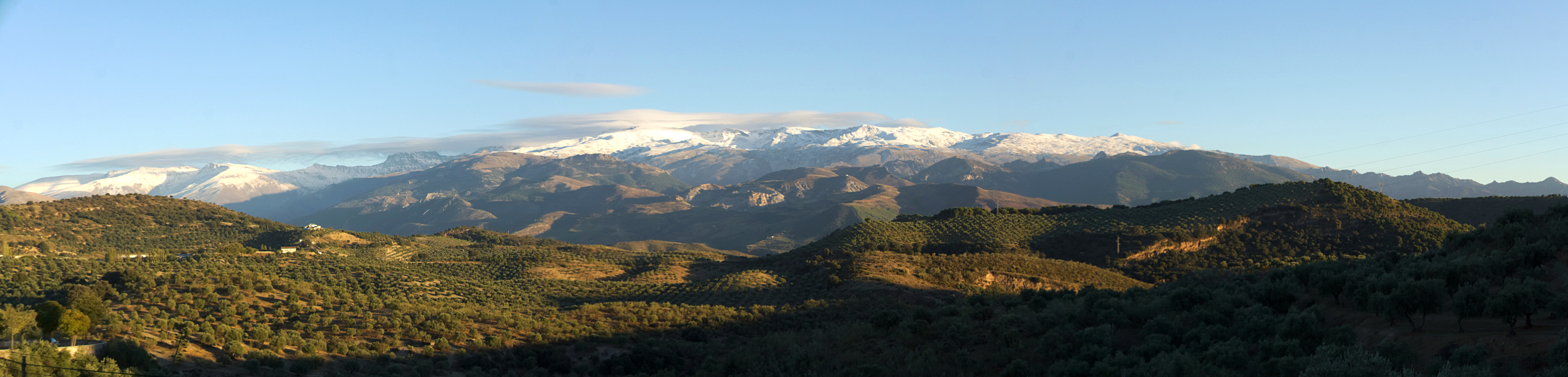
Sierra Nevada from Alquería de Fargue near Granada

Central to the mountain range is a ridge running broadly west-south-west – east-north-east. For a substantial distance, the watershed stays consistently above 3,000 metres (9,800 ft).

On the southern side of the range, several long, narrow river valleys lead off towards the south-west, separated by a number of subsidiary ridges. On the steeper and craggier northern side, the valleys have less regular orientations. This side is dominated by the Rio Genil which starts near Mulhacén and into which many of the other rivers flow.

Geologically, the range is composed chiefly of soft micaceous schists, sloping steeply to the north, but more gradually to the south and south-east.

=== Highest peaks ===
Highest peaks of Sierra Nevada
Peak (> 3,000m)	Height (m)
Mulhacén	3,479
Veleta	3,398
Alcazaba	3,371
Cerro los Machos	3,324
Puntal de Siete Lagunas	3,248
Puntal de la Caldera	3,226
Pico de Elorrieta	3,206
Crestones Río Seco	3,198
Loma Pelada	3,187
Cerro Pelado	3,179
Tajos de la Virgen	3,160
Tosal del Cartujo	3,152
Pico de La Atalaya	3,148
Puntal de Vacares	3,143
Cerro Rasero	3,139
Tajos del Nevero	3,120
Raspones Río Seco	3,120
Tajos Altos	3,111
Picón de Jeres	3,090
Tajo de los Machos	3,088
Cerrillo Redondo	3,058
Juego de Bolos	3,018
Pico del Caballo	3,011

=== Climate ===
According to the Köppen climate classification, Sierra Nevada has a Mediterranean climate (Csa/Csb), with different variations depending on the altitude. Above 2,500 metres (8,200 ft) the climate is subarctic (Dsc), due to the location's high elevation and low summer precipitation. With June and September being around the threshold of 10 °C (50 °F) in mean temperature to avoid the subarctic classification, the climate at a slightly lower elevation is humid continental (Dsa/Dsb). At an elevation slightly lower than that classification area; where February means average above −3 °C (27 °F); it falls into the normal cool-summer Mediterranean classification transitioning with the hot-summer variety in surrounding lowland areas. This renders Sierra Nevada's climate a highland cooled-down variety of a typical Mediterranean climate. Summer and winter daytime temperatures are some 12 °C lower than found in Granada, differences that are even greater in spring as Sierra Nevada takes longer to approach the short summers. In May daytime highs in Sierra Nevada are around 4 °C (39 °F) with Granada having an average of 24 °C (75 °F). The yearly temperature of 3.9 °C (39.0 °F) at the ski station of Pradollano is in stark contrast to Granada's 15.7 °C (60.3 °F) and coastal Málaga's 18.5 °C (65.3 °F).

Climate data for Pradollano Ski Station (1975–1989); 2,507 m (8,225 ft)
Month	Jan	Feb	Mar	Apr	May	Jun	Jul	Aug	Sep	Oct	Nov	Dec	Year
Mean daily maximum °C (°F)	0.3 (32.5)	−0.9 (30.4)	0.6 (33.1)	3.2 (37.8)	4.6 (40.3)	14.9 (58.8)	21.6 (70.9)	19.8 (67.6)	14.2 (57.6)	10.4 (50.7)	3.5 (38.3)	2.6 (36.7)	7.8 (46.0)
Daily mean °C (°F)	−2.9 (26.8)	−4.4 (24.1)	−3.4 (25.9)	−0.6 (30.9)	0.9 (33.6)	9.9 (49.8)	16.6 (61.9)	15.2 (59.4)	9.9 (49.8)	6.3 (43.3)	0.1 (32.2)	−0.7 (30.7)	3.9 (39.0)
Mean daily minimum °C (°F)	−6.1 (21.0)	−7.9 (17.8)	−7.5 (18.5)	−4.3 (24.3)	−2.9 (26.8)	5.6 (42.1)	11.9 (53.4)	10.6 (51.1)	5.7 (42.3)	2.2 (36.0)	−3.3 (26.1)	−4.0 (24.8)	0.0 (32.0)
Average precipitation mm (inches)	86.7 (3.41)	91.2 (3.59)	78.8 (3.10)	53.8 (2.12)	53.6 (2.11)	29.7 (1.17)	6.1 (0.24)	11.7 (0.46)	33.7 (1.33)	69.0 (2.72)	85.2 (3.35)	93.1 (3.67)	692.0 (27.24)
Source 1: Phytosociological Research Center
Source 2: Worldwide Bioclimatic Classification System (Complutense University of Madrid)

== Ecology ==
The Sierra Nevada is home to diverse plant communities, which vary with elevation and exposure. Mediterranean evergreen broadleaf forests and woodlands predominate at lower and middle elevations, with deciduous and conifer forests at higher elevations and subalpine shrublands and grasslands at the highest elevations. The Sierra Nevada is a biodiversity hotspot, home to many endemic and relict species. The European Environment Agency and WWF include the Sierra Nevada in the Iberian conifer forests ecoregion.

Evergreen oaks, chiefly holm oak (Quercus rotundifolia), cork oak (Quercus suber) and kermes oak (Quercus coccifera) and maquis shrubland dominated by Olea europaea, Ceratonia siliqua, Laurus nobilis, Arbutus unedo, Rhamnus alaternus, Pistacia terebinthus, Pistacia lentiscus, Erica arborea, Erica scoparia, Phillyrea angustifolia, Phillyrea latifolia, Myrtus communis and Chamaerops humilis grow on dry and south-facing slopes at low and mid-elevations.

High-elevation plant communities in the Sierra Nevada include high-mountain wet grasslands, high mountain grasslands, and high-mountain shrubland. High-mountain wet grasslands grow on peat soils and around springs fed by snowmelt, and include many endemic species. High-mountain grasslands are dominated by grasses and rosette plants, while high-mountain shrubland grows between 1,800 and 3,100 meters elevation, and is dominated by Juniperus communis and Genista versicolor.

The Sierra Nevada is one of the foremost plant biodiversity hotspots in the Western Mediterranean. 2100 species of vascular plants have been recorded in the Sierra Nevada, of which 80 are endemic, including about 40% of high-elevation species. Some species endemic to the Sierra Nevada and nearby Baetic mountains include Aquilegia nevadensis, Arenaria funiculata, Carex camposii, Lavandula lanata and Salvia candelabrum.

== Sport ==
- Sierra Nevada Ski Station

== In Media ==
The British Electronic-Duo The KLF filmed a portion of their unreleased 1989 Road Film "The White Room" around and on Sierra Nevada.

== Gallery ==
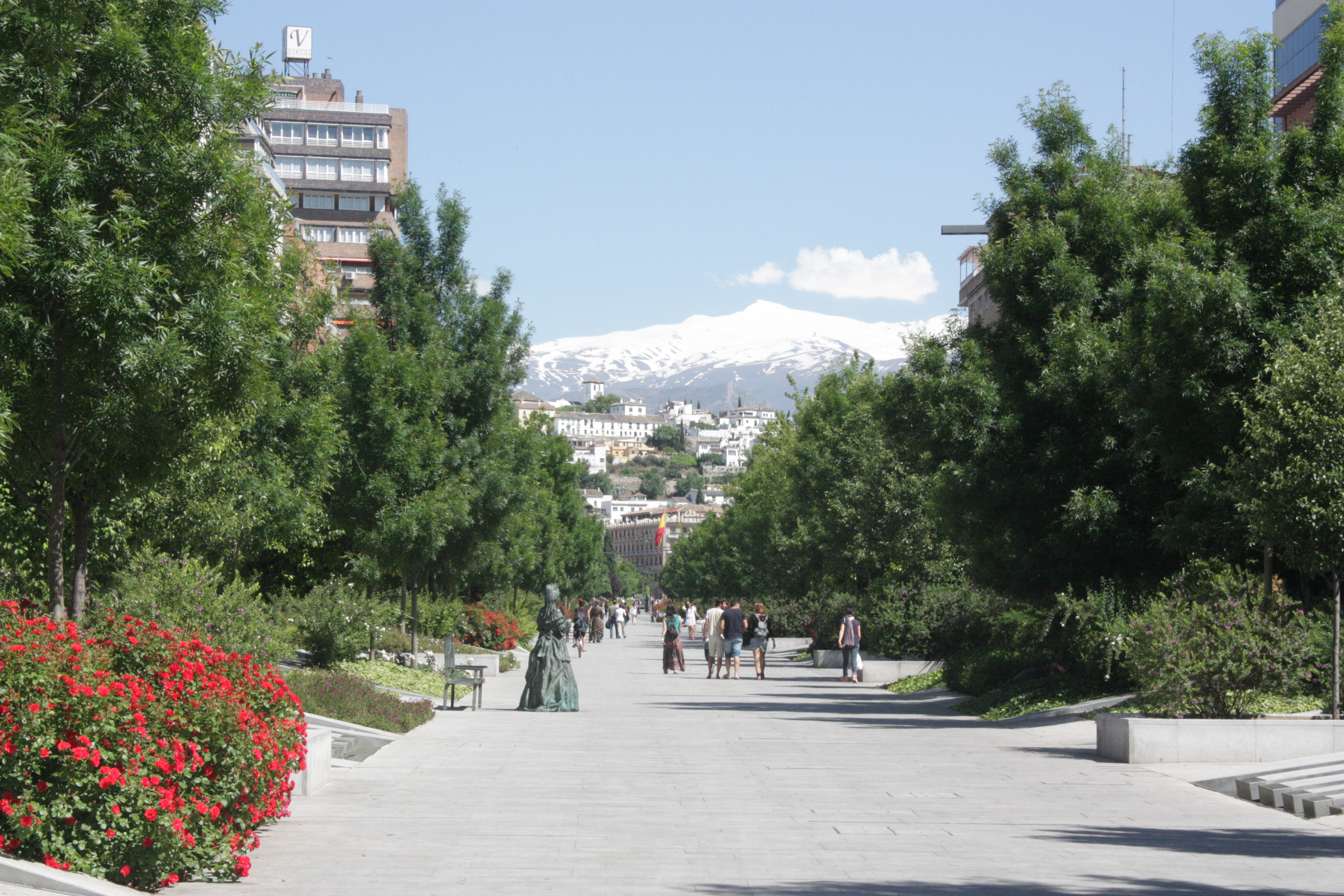
Sierra Nevada—view from Granada city

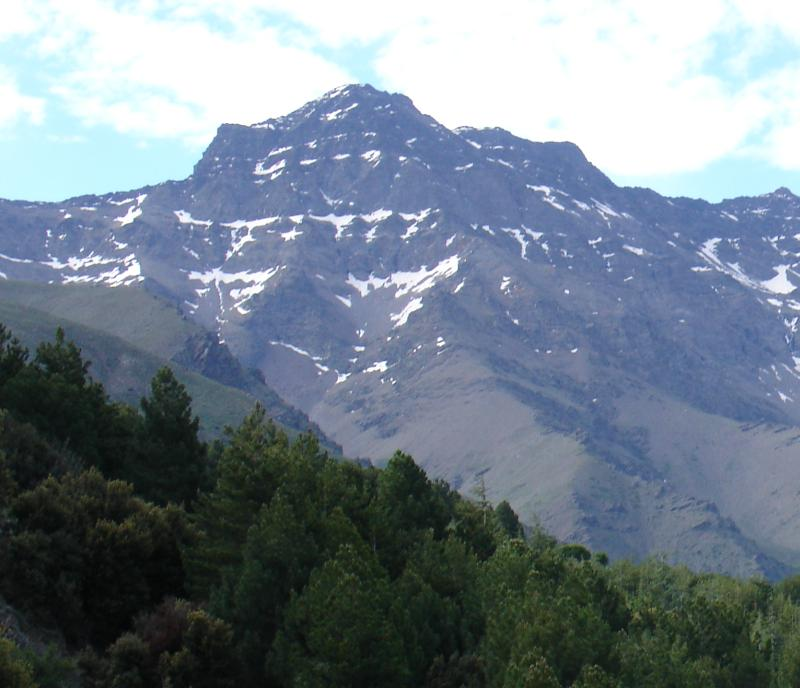
Alcazaba mountain

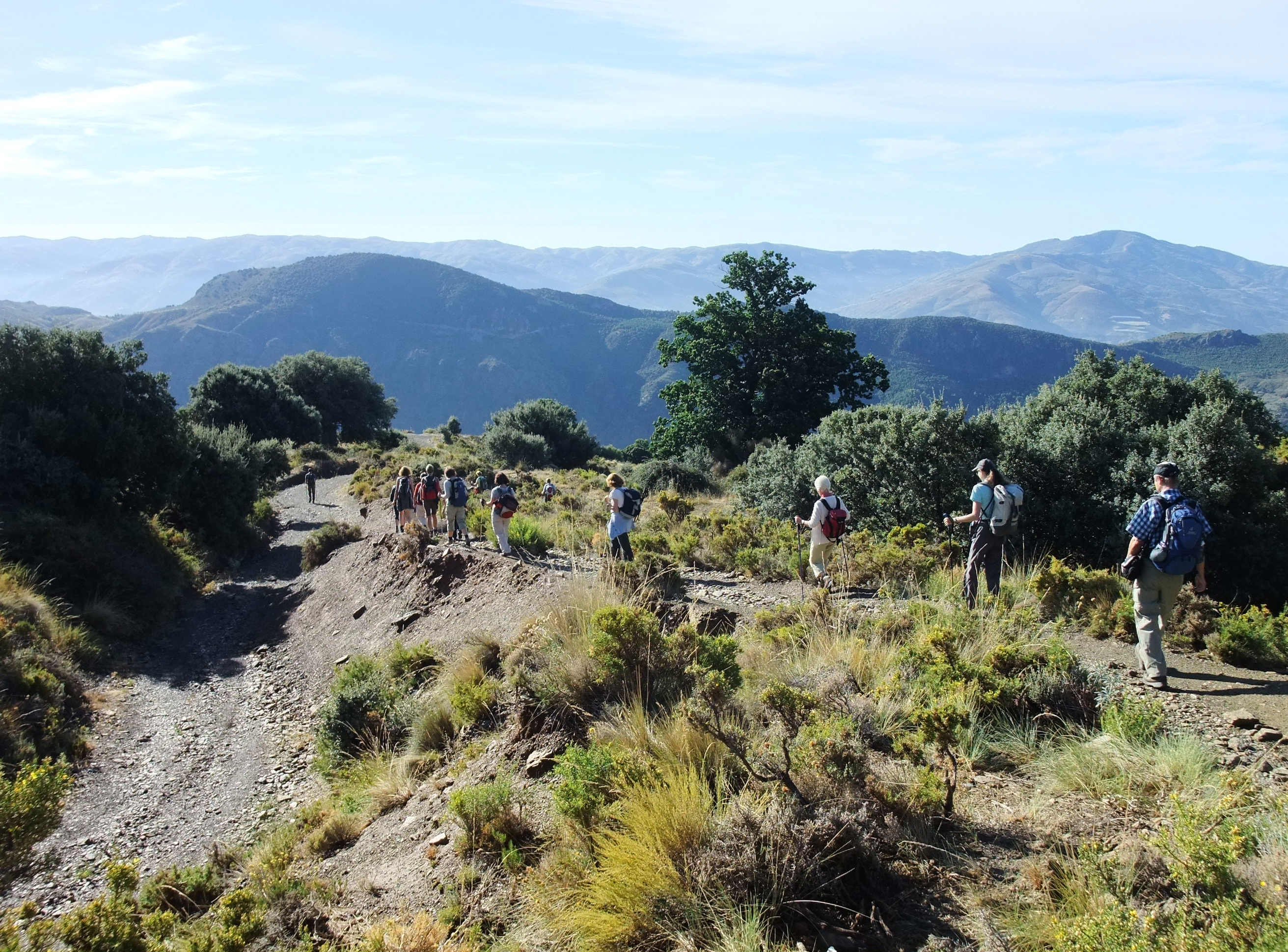
Landscape south of Pitres

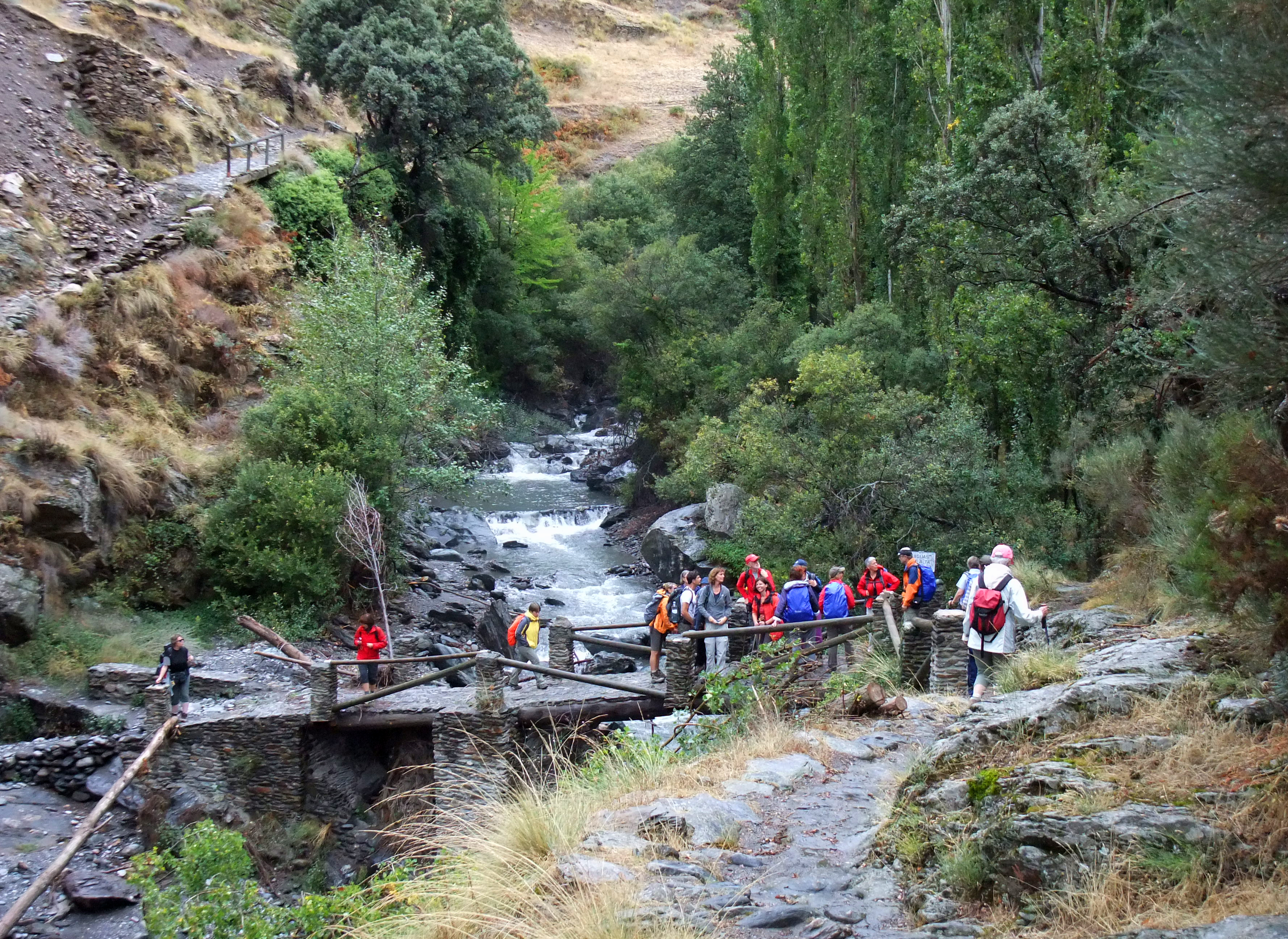
Stone bridge over Rio Poqueira, Sierra Nevada

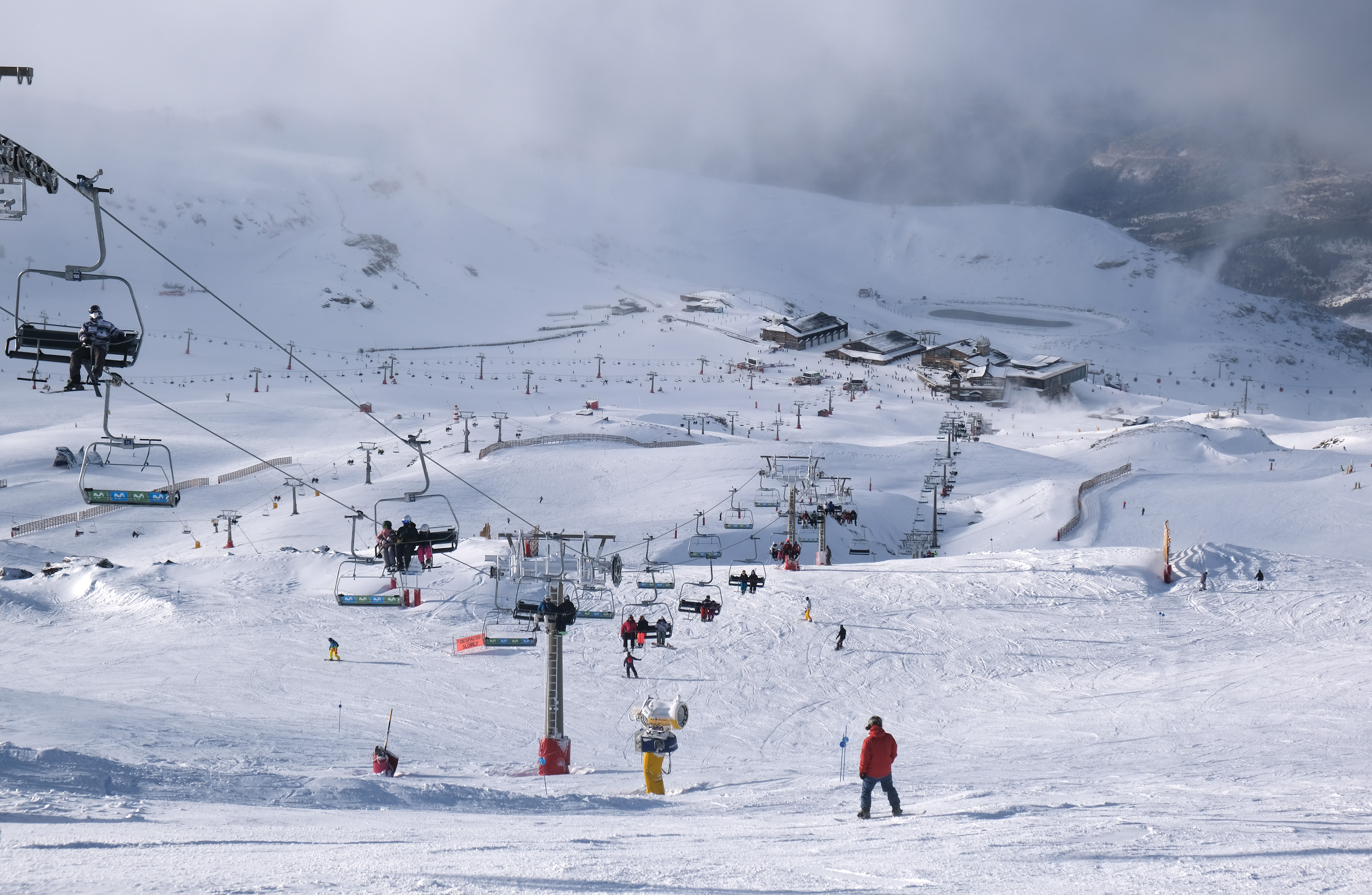
The Sierra Nevada Ski Station

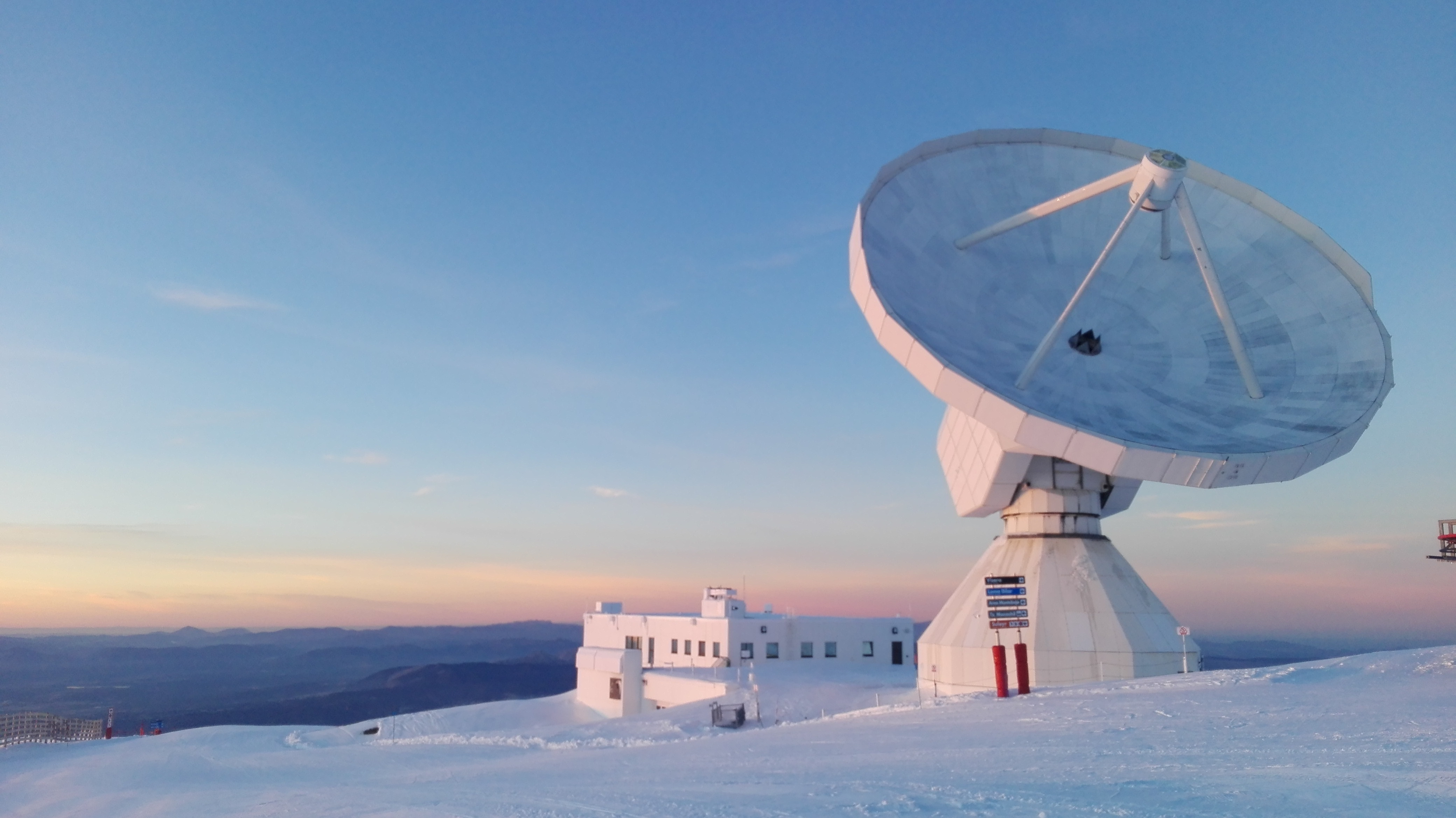
Sierra Nevada Radiotelescope

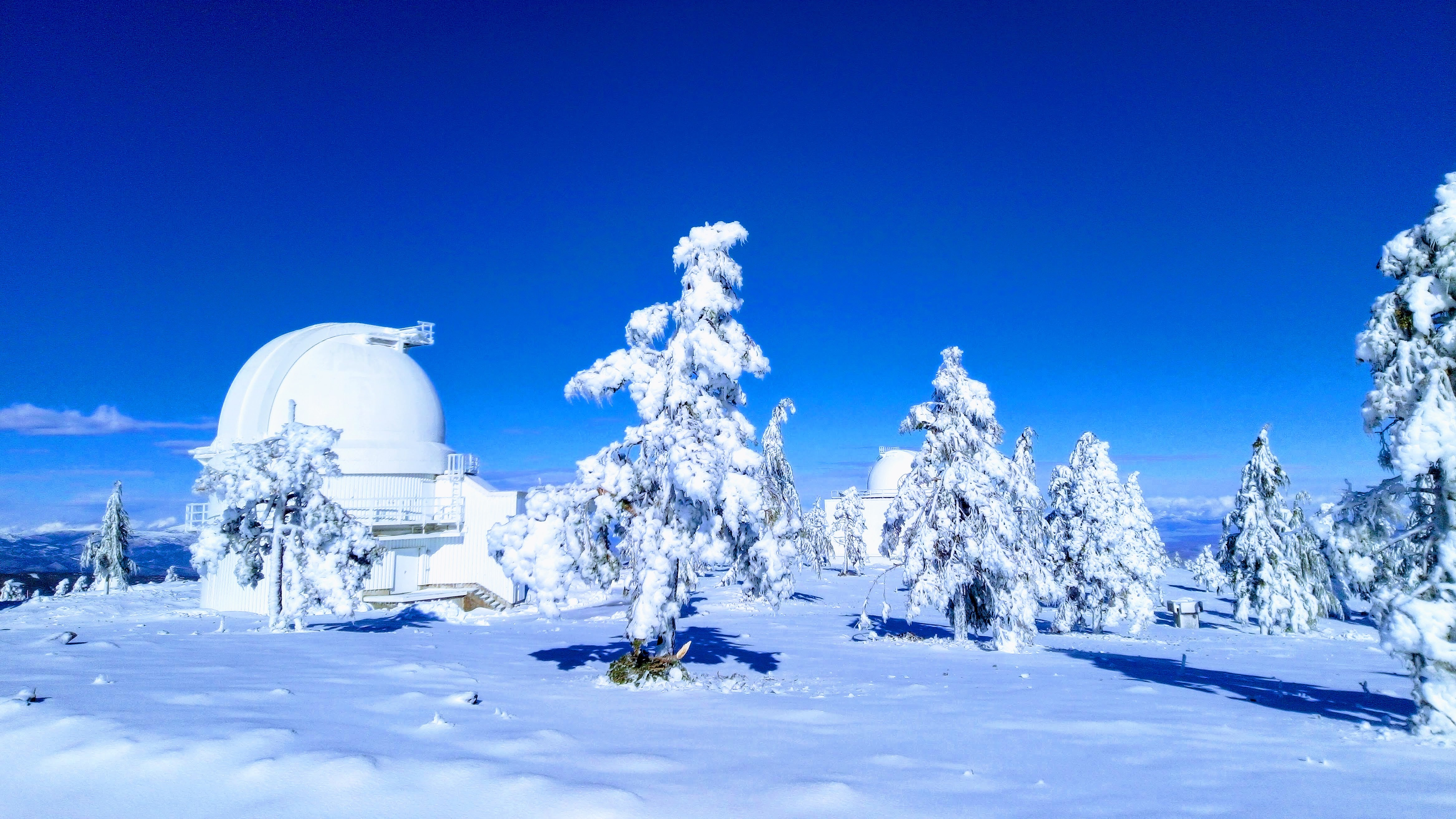
Calar Alto Observatory

== See also ==
- Alpujarras
- Baetic System
- Sierra Nevada National Park
