= Mulhacén =

Highest mountain in the Iberian Peninsula

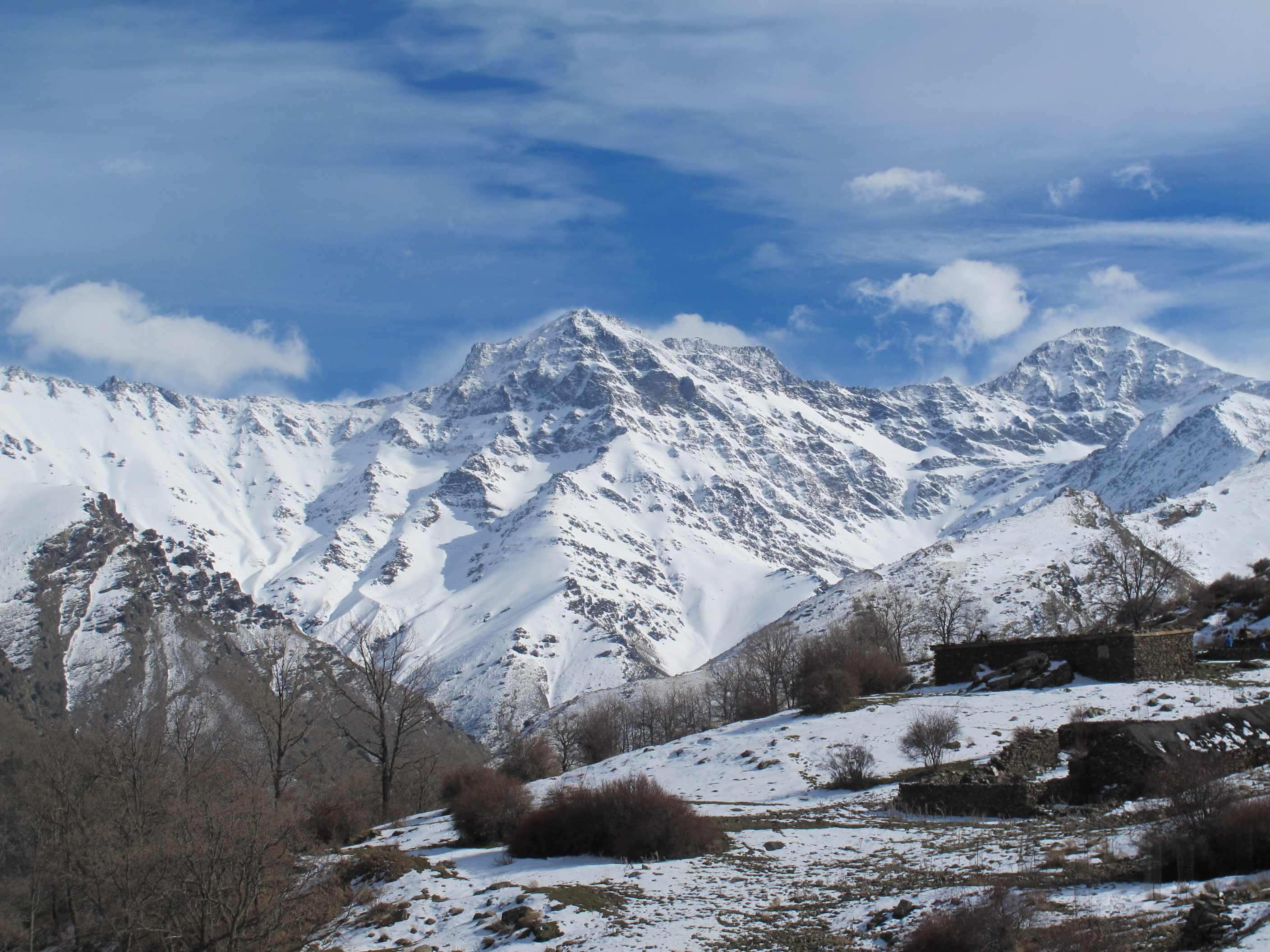

Highest point
- Elevation: 3,479 m (11,414 ft)
- Prominence: 3,285 m (10,778 ft); Ranked 64th
- Isolation: 527.9 km (328.0 mi) to Jbel Ayachi
- Listing: Ultra
- Coordinates: 37°03′12″N 3°18′41″W

Geography
- Location within Spain Location within Andalusia
- Country: Spain
- Community: Andalusia
- Province: Granada
- Parent range: Sierra Nevada

Climbing
- First ascent: Unknown (before 1500)
- Easiest route: Hike

Mulhacén ([mulaˈθen]), with an elevation of 3,479 metres (11,414 ft), is the highest mountain in peninsular Spain and in all of the Iberian Peninsula. It is part of the Sierra Nevada range in the Penibaetic System. It is named after Abu'l-Hasan Ali, known as Muley Hacén in Spanish, the penultimate Muslim ruler of Granada in the 15th century who, according to legend, was buried on the summit of the mountain. It is still known in present-day Arabic as Jabal Mawla el-Hassan (Mountain of Mawla el-Hassan).

Mulhacén is the highest peak in Southern Europe (Note: The Canary Islands and Greenland, which are politically attached to Europe, but which are geographically part of Africa and North America respectively, have higher peaks.) outside of the Alps. It is also the third-most prominent peak in Western Europe, after Mont Blanc and Mount Etna, and is ranked 64th in the world by prominence. The peak is not exceptionally dramatic in terms of steepness or local relief. The south flank of the mountain is gentle and presents no technical challenge, as is the case for the long west ridge. The shorter, somewhat steeper northeast ridge is slightly more technical. The north face of the mountain is much steeper and offers several routes involving moderately steep climbing on snow and ice (up to French grade AD) in the winter.

Mulhacén can be climbed in a single day from the villages of either Capileira or Trevélez, but it is more common to spend a night at the mountain refuge at Poqueira, or in the bare shelter at Caldera to the west. Those making the ascent from Trevélez can also bivouac at the tarns to the northeast of the peak.

== Accidents ==
On 5 March 2006, three British climbers from Teesside died on the mountain from suspected hypothermia. Initial reports quoting the Spanish Civil Guard stated that the three were ill-equipped for the extreme conditions. This claim was subsequently disputed both by the family and a colleague of one of the climbers, and by one of the rescuers. A plaque dedicated to them has been placed at the summit.
