= Condado de Huelva =

Spanish wine geographical indication

Coordinates: 42°28′52″N 1°39′2″E

Condado de Huelva DOP
- Wine region
- Condado de Huelva DOP in the province of Huelva in the region of Andalusia
- Official name: D.O.P. Condado de Huelva
- Type: Denominación de Origen Protegida (DOP)
- Year established: 1963
- Country: Spain
- No. of vineyards: 2,384 hectares (5,891 acres)
- No. of wineries: 21
- Wine produced: 77,431 hectolitres
- Comments: Data for 2016 / 2017

The 6 DO wine regions in Andalusia (Spain)

Condado de Huelva is a Spanish Denominación de Origen Protegida (DOP) for wines located in the south-east of the province of Huelva (Andalusia, Spain). The wines, known as the Wines of the Discovery of America, are produced there.

The winegrowing area that is currently covered by the Denominación de Origen Protegida Condado de Huelva and Vinagre del Condado de Huelva includes 18 municipalities, of which Bollullos Par del Condado, Almonte, Chucena, La Palma del Condado, Manzanilla, Moguer, Rociana del Condado, San Juan del Puerto and Villalba del Alcor are authorised for winegrowing by the DOP Regulatory Council.

The protected area is approximately 6,000 ha, with an average grape production of 40 million kg, equivalent to 320,000 hl of must. In the region, there are about 3,100 grape farmers. All grape producers are either independent or cooperative members.

== Surroundings ==
The grape-growing lands covered by the DO is mainly flat or slightly undulating. In general, the soils are neutral or slightly alkali and are of average fertility. Some areas are optimal for grape growing. The average height of the vineyards is 25 m above sea level, and the soils tend to be sandy with a high lime content.

The climate in the Condado de Huelva is ideal for grape growing: mild in Winter and Spring with long hot summers tempered by the influence of the Atlantic Ocean. The average temperature is around 18°C, a relative humidity of between 60% and 80%, and an average annual rainfall of around 700 mm.

== History ==
The first documented and trustworthy reference to grape growing in the area dates back to the 14th century. There are, however, legends referring to barter between the Tartessos and the Ancient Greeks, shipments of wine sent to Ancient Rome, and of the tolerance of the Muslims towards grape growing and winemaking.

The repopulation of Andalusia after the Reconquest in the 14th century would make the first cultivation of vines be in the Condado de Niebla, the origin of the current Condado. Don Juan Mestre, Master of the Order of Calatrava, was involved in the repopulation of Villalba de Alcor in 1327. Eight years later, he donated one hundred "aranzadas" of hillsides to Don Romero Díaz with the condition that in the space of one year, he would clear this land and plant it with vineyards. However, as the work proved to be too much, the deadline was extended and authorization was given for the land to be cultivated by colonists. At this point the wealth of the Condado began to grow.

During the 14th century, the importance of the villages in the Condado increased both socially and economically. Such was the quality and quantity of the wines produced that the city of Seville - which extended to the municipality of Manzanilla - was obliged to pass new protectionist laws to protect its own market. However, due to the prestige and quality of the wines from Bollullos, Villalba, Almonte and La Palma, they continued to be sold in the Sevillian market. The golden age continued during the 15th century. The areas under cultivation grew, aging techniques were improved, and Manzanilla wine overtook common bulk wine in volume. Exports to England and the Netherlands of all types of wine increased especially through the ports of Palos de la Frontera and Moguer. Without a doubt, after the wines, the vines themselves were also exported, as many of the Conquistadores that accompanied Cristopher Columbus on his voyages were from these villages.

== The Discovery of America Wines ==
There are historical documents which date the first shipment of wine from the Condado de Huelva to the West Indies in January 1502. This wine was worth 1,422 "maravedíes" and left Seville for La Española in the same fleet as Fray Nicolás de Ovando. This exporting tradition was to last for several centuries, reaching a peak in the 16th century.

The second half of the 18th century marked the start of the decline of wine trade to the West Indies from the port of Seville, due to the transfer of the Casa de Contratación to Cádiz. The wines of the Condado were now sent to the ports of Cádiz, Puerto Real, Puerto de Santa María and Sanlúcar, from where they were shipped to the Americas.

The end of the century saw the start of the arrival and settling down of many wine families from La Rioja, among them that of Juan Ramón Jiménez, who were to usher in a new period of prosperity which would last for most of the 19th century. At the end of this century, however, the phylloxera plague reached the Condado, along with the rest of Europe, and the area would remain depressed until the 1920s.

A recovery started once resistant rootstock began to be used but the wines of the area had lost their prestige of the previous centuries and had to make do supplying domestic demand until well into the 20th century.

Nevertheless, conscious of the need to produce quality wine and in an attempt to recover the reputation of former times, the Huelva Denominación de Origen was created on 10 May 1962, and in 1963 by order of the Spanish Ministry of Agriculture the Statutes of the Condado de Huelva D.O. were approved, with the aim of promoting the excellence of the Wines of the Discovery Of America.

Another step on the road to wine quality and tradition in the Condado de Huelva was the recent creation of the Vinagre del Condado de Huelva D.O., approved on 31 July 2002. On the same date the statutes of the 40-year-old Condado de Huelva D.O. were updated.

== Authorised Grape Varieties ==
The authorised grape varieties are:

- Red: Merlot, Syrah, Tempranillo, Cabernet Sauvignon, and Cabernet Franc
- White: Zalema, Palomino, Listán de Huelva, Garrido Fino, Moscatel de Alejandría, Colombard, Sauvignon Blanc, Chardonnay, and Pedro Ximénez

Of these varieties, Zalema is by far the most common one and represents 86% of the total planted.

With regard to the planting systems, the most common one is low vines with a maximum density of 2,500 vines/ha. For high vines trained along wires, the maximum authorised density is 3,000 vines/ha. For pruning methods in the Condado de Huelva, the most common one is the one known as "en vaso", and for the Palomino Fino and Listán de Huelva varieties, the system used is the one known as "vara y pulgar".
