= Repopulation of Andalusia =

The repopulation of Andalusia was a historical process of demographic replacement and social and territorial reorganization that took place between the 13th and 17th centuries. During this process, the Muslim population was expelled, displaced, or drastically reduced and largely replaced by Christian settlers from the northern territories of Spain, along with a Jewish minority who also came from other regions of the peninsula. This process followed the conquest and incorporation of the territories of Al-Andalus into the Crown of Castile during the final stages of the Reconquista.

Map of Andalusia and its municipalities in the 17th century.

Before the Castilian repopulation of Andalusia began, the region's Christian and Jewish communities, which had been progressively marginalized and persecuted, had been expelled or forcibly Islamized in the 12th century under the Muslim dynasties of the Almoravids and the Almohads (in two specific episodes: the Expulsion of Andalusi Christians in 1126 and the Expulsion of the Jews in 1146). The subsequent Christian conquest of Andalusia encouraged the settlement of people from other regions of Spain, among whom there may have been descendants of the ancient Christian and Jewish communities that had inhabited these territories before their expulsion.

The process took place in two major phases. The first began after King Ferdinand III conquered the kingdoms of Córdoba, Jaén and Seville, in Lower Andalusia. His campaigns were facilitated by the Christian victory over the Almohads at the Battle of Las Navas de Tolosa in 1212, during the reign of his grandfather Alfonso VIII of Castile. The second phase began after the conquest of Granada in 1492 by the Catholic Monarchs, more than two centuries later.

The expulsion of the Mudéjars (Muslims living under Christian rule) from Lower Andalusia following the Mudéjar revolt of 1264, and the expulsion of the Moriscos from the Kingdom of Granada—corresponding to the present-day provinces of Granada, Málaga and Almería—following the Rebellion of the Alpujarras in 1568, brought an end to the Andalusian population of Muslim origin in the region.

The displacement of Andalusia's earlier population was so extensive that historian Manuel González Jiménez described it as "the practical replacement of one population by another". In the rest of Spain, Morisco communities remained until the general Expulsion of the Moriscos in 1609.

== Historical background ==
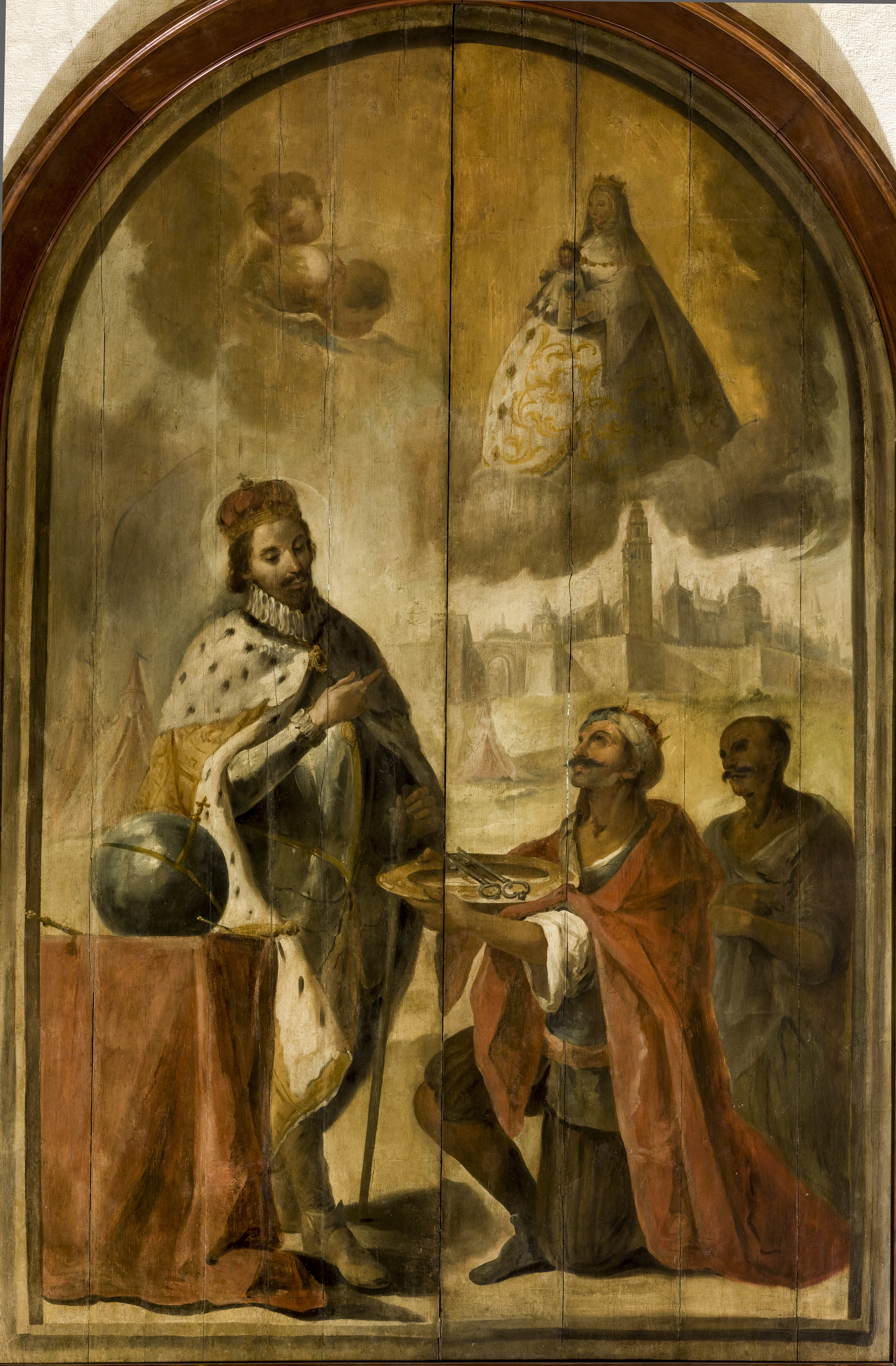
The surrender of Seville to King Saint Ferdinand of Castile.

The conquest of most of Andalusia took place during the 13th century, amid the decline of Almohad power following the Battle of Las Navas de Tolosa in 1212. Under Ferdinand III of Castile and Alfonso X, the Crown of Castile incorporated key cities, including Córdoba in 1236, Jaén in 1246 and Seville in 1248, as well as extensive areas of the Guadalquivir Valley.

These conquests brought about a major demographic upheaval. In territories captured after sieges, the Muslim population was expelled, while in other places it initially remained under Christian rule as a Mudéjar population, in accordance with the terms of surrender agreements. This coexistence largely ended following the Mudéjar revolt of 1264, which led to the expulsion or mass departure of Muslims from Lower Andalusia and the region of Murcia.

The Guadalquivir Valley became sparsely populated and difficult to inhabit as many Muslims moved to the neighbouring Muslim Kingdom of Granada. The area was gradually resettled by Christians from northern Iberia in a slow and prolonged process. This demographic and territorial transformation has been cited as one factor in the lengthy process that preceded the conquest of Granada and the completion of the Reconquista.

The main aim of the initial repopulation was to consolidate Christian control over the Guadalquivir Valley and the frontier areas bordering the Nasrid Kingdom of Granada, by establishing Christian settlements and redistributing land ownership.

== The repopulation process ==
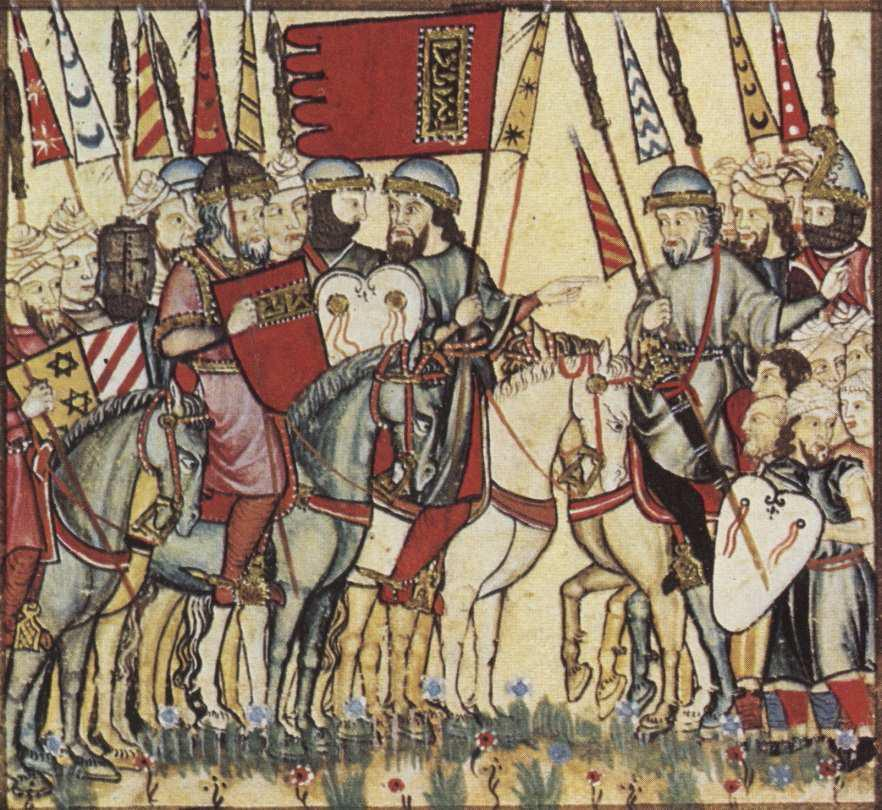
The Mudéjar revolt of 1264–1266.

Repopulation was organised and largely controlled by the Castilian monarchy. Its principal instrument was the repartimiento, a system through which land, houses and other real property were allocated to incoming Christian settlers.

Two main types of land grant were distinguished:

- Donadíos: large estates granted to members of the nobility, the Church and the military orders.
- Heredamientos: smaller landholdings granted to settlers who were required to reside locally, cultivate the land and undertake military and defensive duties.

Most settlers came from different territories within the Crown of Castile, although settlers from other Iberian kingdoms and western Europe also arrived.

== Society and settlement patterns ==
Repopulation brought about the establishment of a Castilian-style feudal society in Andalusia, although it developed distinctive regional characteristics. From the outset, society was predominantly composed of free landowners, without peasant serfdom, but was strongly hierarchical and militarised because of the region's frontier status.

Urban centres became important administrative, military and economic hubs. Rural settlement, by contrast, remained limited, particularly in areas near the frontier with Granada, where many former Islamic villages were abandoned. This situation encouraged the development of extensive animal husbandry and attracted the interest of the Honrado Concejo de la Mesta in Andalusia's pasturelands.

Agriculture was oriented primarily towards dryland cereal production, with two-field crop rotation and fallow predominating at the expense of other crops characteristic of Andalusi agriculture.

== Repopulation in the 14th and 15th centuries ==
Repopulation continued during the 14th and 15th centuries, although at a slower pace. Two main types of settlement activity developed:

- Frontier resettlement, promoted by the Crown through fiscal and legal privileges intended to attract settlers to towns facing the Nasrid Kingdom of Granada.
- Internal resettlement, promoted mainly by lay and ecclesiastical lords seeking to bring depopulated land into cultivation and strengthen their jurisdictional control over their estates.

The repopulation of Lower Andalusia consolidated Castilian rule over a strategically important territory and laid the demographic, institutional and cultural foundations of late medieval Andalusia. However, the process was uneven, and extensive areas remained sparsely populated for centuries. In the long term, it played a key role in shaping Andalusia's historical, social and territorial development within the Crown of Castile.

== Repopulation of the Kingdom of Granada ==
Map of the Kingdom of Granada in the 18th century.

Following the Granada War (1482–1492), a new phase of repopulation began in the former Nasrid kingdom. It was also organised through repartimientos and shared characteristics with the process carried out in the 13th century.

Repopulation of the Kingdom of Granada began in 1482 and intensified following the conquest of Ronda in 1485. It followed a model similar to that used in the Guadalquivir Valley in the 13th century. The Crown directed the operation, allocating land and property to Christian settlers through the repartimiento system according to their social status.

The settlers came mainly from territories belonging to the Crown of Castile, as well as from other Iberian kingdoms, particularly neighbouring regions such as the Kingdom of Jaén, Western Andalusia, the Kingdom of Murcia and Extremadura. To encourage settlement, the Catholic Monarchs granted temporary tax exemptions, which in practice continued throughout the 1490s.

Initially, repopulation was limited to territories that had resisted the conquest. In many cities and districts, including Granada, surrender agreements allowed the Muslim population to retain its property, religion and customs, or to emigrate freely until 1493. This arrangement initially permitted a Christian minority to coexist with a Mudéjar majority, but proved unstable.

=== Expulsion of the Moriscos from Granada ===
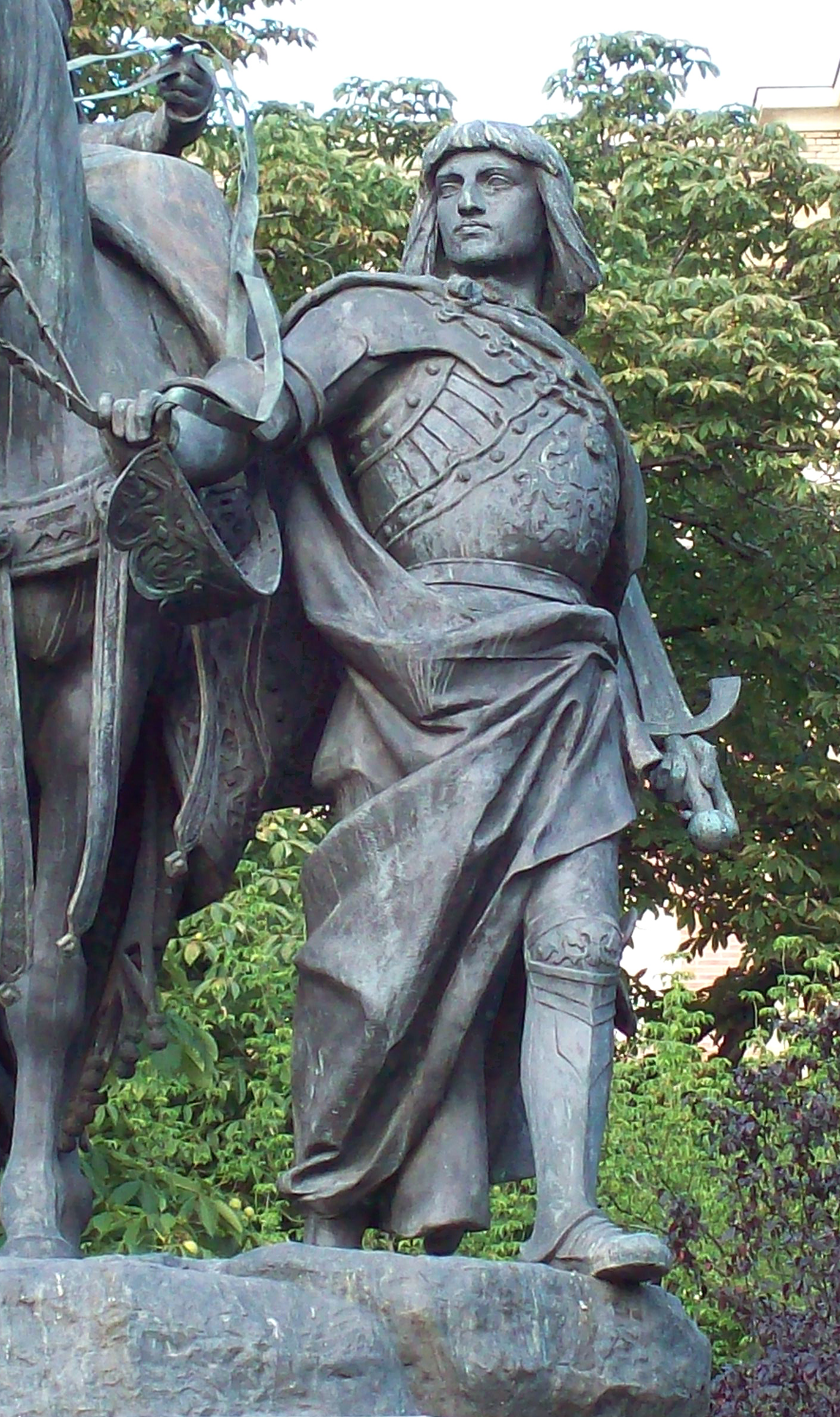
Monument representing the Gran Capitán.

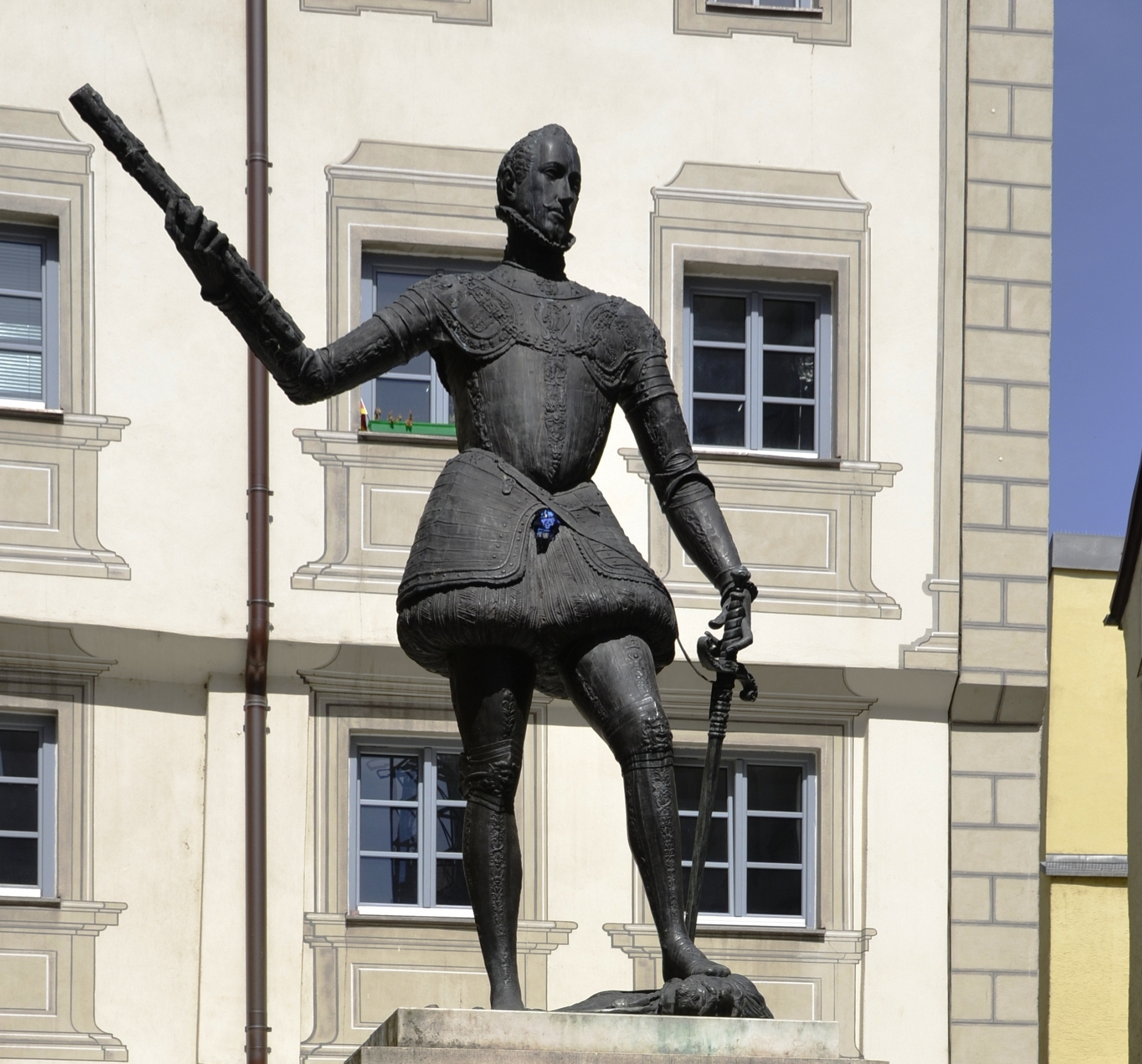
Monument to John of Austria.

Tensions led to a series of revolts, beginning with the Albaicín revolt of 1499, which spread to several mountainous areas and continued until 1501. After the revolt was suppressed by the military commander Gonzalo Fernández de Córdoba, known as the Gran Capitán, King Ferdinand the Catholic ordered ships to be made ready at the port of Estepona to transport Muslims who wished to preserve their religion by emigrating to North Africa. Those who wished to remain in Spain were required to convert to Christianity and became known as Moriscos. The difficulties of their assimilation culminated in another uprising, the Rebellion of the Alpujarras of 1568, after which the authorities decided to deport the Morisco population from the Kingdom of Granada.

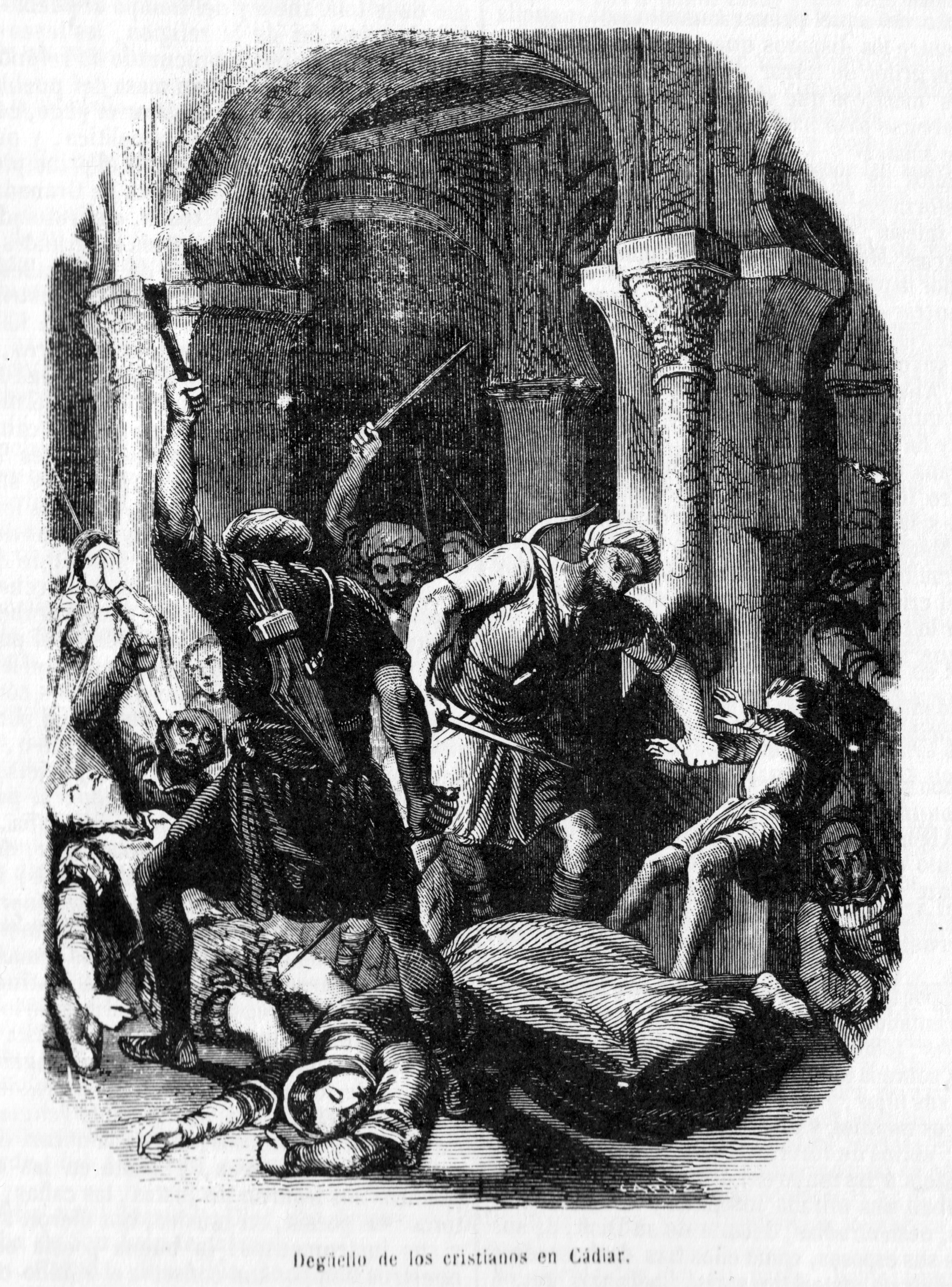
A 19th-century illustration depicting the killing of Christians by the monfíes of the Alpujarras.

Following the revolt, which was suppressed by Don John of Austria, almost all the Moriscos who remained in the Kingdom of Granada—more than 60,000 people—were forcibly dispersed throughout the Crown of Castile. The expulsion order applied to everyone, including those who had not taken part in the uprising.

According to the Venetian ambassador Leonardo Donato, a third of the Moriscos living in the region had also died during the Alpujarras War. Extensive areas of the present-day provinces of Almería, Granada and Málaga were left depopulated. Of the region's 400 villages, only 270 had been resettled half a century later.

Excerpt from a 1572 law that imposed the death penalty on Moriscos who returned to the Kingdom of Granada.

Historian Antonio Domínguez Ortiz argued that, despite the deep suspicion with which Old Christians regarded Moriscos and the rarity of intermarriage, the former Granada Moriscos, dispersed throughout Castile, might eventually have become integrated over successive generations. However, continued contacts between Moriscos from different parts of Spain, their alleged dealings with the French and Ottoman Turks and with Barbary pirates, and the rapid growth of the Morisco population in the Kingdom of Valencia, contributed to King Philip III's decision to decree their general expulsion in 1609, following the advice of the Duke of Lerma. The policy was intended, among other things, to prevent Moriscos from acting as a fifth column in the event of an attack by Ottoman or North African forces.

The Arabist Francisco Javier Simonet compared this expulsion to the Expulsion of Andalusi Christians in 1126, when Muslim rulers deported most of the Christians (Mozarabs) who still lived in Islamic Andalusia to North Africa.

== Survivals of the Andalusi past ==
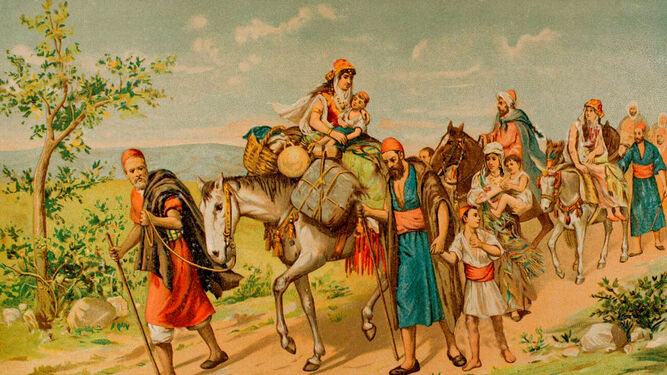
The expulsion of the Moriscos in 1609, in a drawing by Juan Alaminos López.

Although resettlement represented a profound break with the preceding Islamic society, some features of the Andalusi past survived. These included aspects of urban planning, such as irregular street layouts; certain hydraulic infrastructures; and the continued use of agricultural and industrial facilities, including flour mills and olive oil mills.

These survivals were nevertheless limited and did not alter the overall pattern of replacement of the Islamic social formation by a Christian society of Castilian origin. Referring to Seville, historian Julio González González, a pioneer in the study of Andalusian resettlement, described the transformation as "profound and radical". More explicitly, Miguel Ángel Ladero Quesada characterised it as "the uprooting of a social formation, the Islamic-Andalusi, and its replacement by another, the Christian-European, represented by the settlers".

== Bibliography ==
- Domínguez Ortiz, Antonio (1964). "Los moriscos granadinos antes de su definitiva expulsión" [The Moriscos of Granada before their final expulsion]. Miscelánea de estudios árabes y hebraicos (in Spanish). 12–13: 113–128.
- González Jiménez, Manuel (1997). "La repoblación de Andalucía (Siglos XIII-XV)" [The resettlement of Andalusia (13th–15th centuries)] (PDF). Relaciones (COLMICH, Zamora) (in Spanish). 18 (69). Zamora, Mexico: COLMICH, Zamora: 22–40. Archived from the original (PDF) on 20 June 2022.
- Guichot, Joaquín (1913). Historia general de Andalucía. Tomo VI [General history of Andalusia, volume VI] (in Spanish).
- Lafuente, Modesto (1862). Historia general de España, tomo VIII [General history of Spain, volume VIII] (in Spanish).
- Lapeyre, Henri (2011). Geografía de la España morisca [Geography of Morisco Spain] (in Spanish). Universitat de València.
- Montes Romero-Camacho, Isabel (2007). "Historia medieval: un único rey, una única ley" [Medieval history: one king, one law]. La Aventura de la Historia (in Spanish). No. Extra 5 (Andalusia special issue). p. 27. ISSN 1579-427X. 2. Las Navas de Tolosa: Los orígenes de Andalucía [2. Las Navas de Tolosa: The origins of Andalusia]
- Simonet, Francisco Javier (1897–1903). Historia de los mozárabes de España [History of the Mozarabs of Spain] (in Spanish). Madrid.
