= Aben Aboo =

Morisco leader during the Second Rebellion of the Alpujarras

Aben Aboo (also written Aben Abó or Abenabó; died 1571), also known as Diego López, was a Morisco leader during the final phase of the Second Rebellion of the Alpujarras in the Kingdom of Granada. After the assassination of his cousin Aben Humeya in 1569, he was proclaimed leader of the Morisco insurgency and adopted the regnal name Muley Abdalla (Muley Abdallah).

He led the Morisco resistance during the last stages of the revolt against the Spanish Crown, which ended with his death in 1571 and the collapse of organized insurgency in the Alpujarras.

== History ==
The Second Rebellion of the Alpujarras (1568–1571) was the largest Morisco uprising in sixteenth-century Spain. The revolt broke out in the mountainous Alpujarra region of the former Emirate of Granada following increasing pressure on Morisco communities, including prohibitions on language, dress, and cultural practices imposed by royal policy.

In 1568 the rebels proclaimed Aben Humeya as their king, presenting the revolt as both a political and religious struggle against royal authority. After his assassination in 1569, leadership passed to his relative Aben Aboo.

Following the death of Aben Humeya, Aben Aboo was recognized by the Morisco rebels as the new leader and assumed the title Muley Abdalla. His leadership coincided with the most destructive phase of the conflict, as royal forces intensified military operations under the command of John of Austria.

During this period the insurgency relied heavily on guerrilla warfare in the mountainous terrain of the Alpujarras. Morisco leaders also attempted to obtain assistance from Muslim powers across the Mediterranean, particularly from Ottoman Algeria, although such support remained limited.

Internal divisions among rebel factions and the growing strength of royal forces gradually weakened the resistance.

Aben Aboo was killed in 1571 by members of his own entourage during the final stage of the rebellion. His death effectively ended coordinated Morisco resistance in the Alpujarras, and the revolt soon collapsed under the pressure of royal military campaigns.

Much of the early narrative of the rebellion comes from contemporary or near-contemporary Spanish chroniclers such as Luis del Mármol Carvajal. Modern historians have re-examined these sources critically, comparing them with archival material in order to reconstruct the social and political dynamics of the Morisco revolt.

== See also ==
- Aben Humeya
- Second Rebellion of the Alpujarras
- Moriscos
