= Faraj ibn Faraj =

16th century Morisco chief during the Rebellion of the Alpujarras

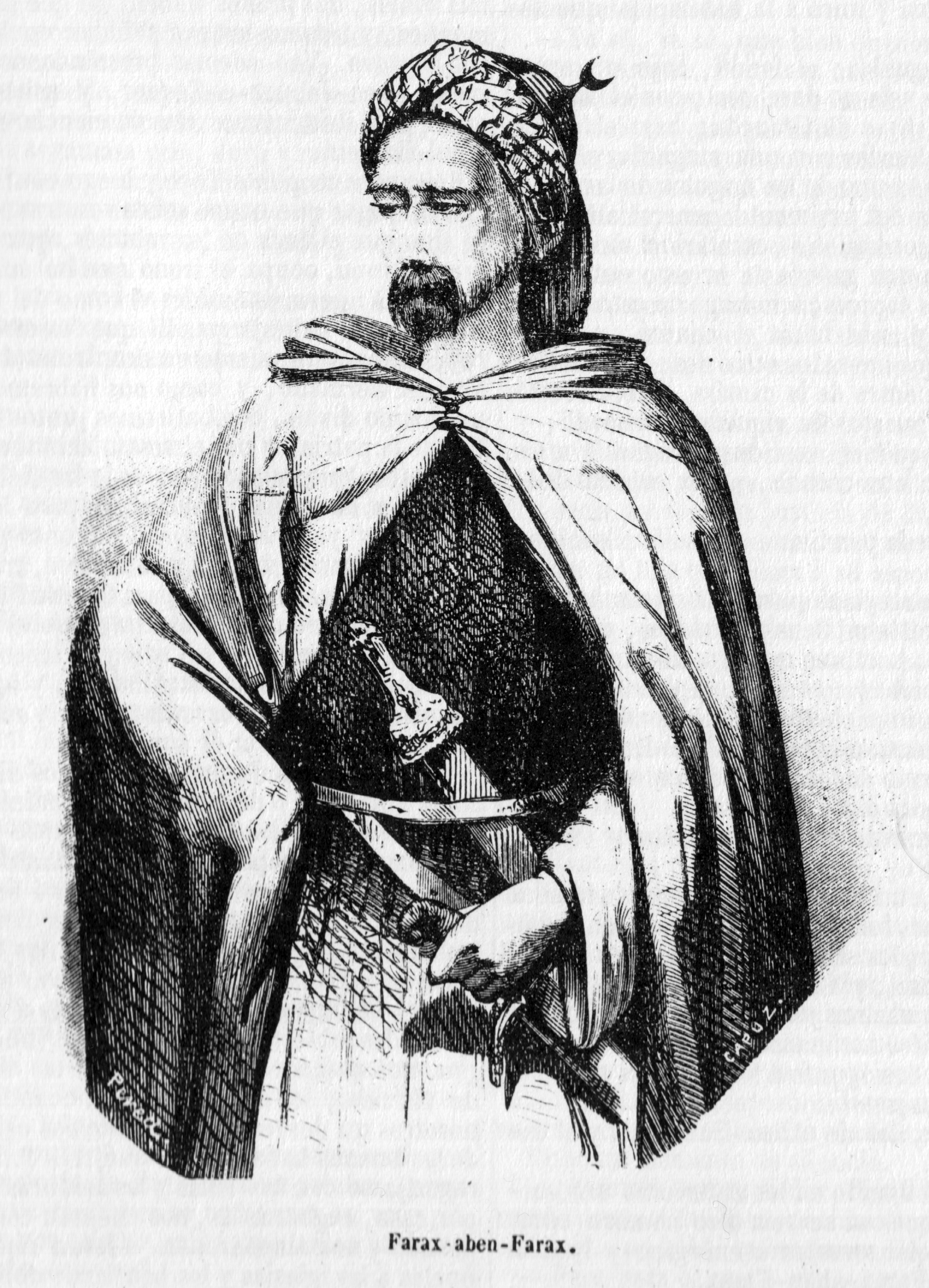
Portrait of Faraj ibn Faraj by Manuel Fernández y González, 1859.

Faraj ibn Faraj (Arabic: فرج بن فرج) was chief constable of Aben Humeya. He was one of the Moorish leaders of the Rebellion of the Alpujarras and chief of the still powerful Abencerrajes family. Before the rebellion, he worked as a rouge dyer in Granada; he had his workshop in Rabal Albaida. Together with Fernando el Zaguer, alcaide of Cádiar, Abén Aboo, and Miguel Rojas of Ugíjar, he led the rebellion of the Moors of the Alpujarras on Maundy Thursday 1568, but the insurrection was temporarily halted by the Marquis of Mondéjar and the Count of Tendilla, who managed to keep the Albaicín at bay for some time. Faraj managed to access the Albaicín, inciting the neighborhood to revolt with the help of Genoese, Turks, and Moors from North Africa, but his rebellion was aborted. He then headed to La Alpujarra, asserting his supposed rights to the Moorish throne, as he descended from the Abencerrajes, entering into conflict with Aben Humeya. He was famous for his cruelty in battles. The leader of the rebellion, Abn Humeya, appointed him chief constable of the kingdom. The day after his appointment, he attacked the town of Lanjarón and burned the church with many of its inhabitants inside. He died in confrontation with the troops of John of Austria after a clash with Íñigo López de Mendoza.
