= Zalema =

Variety of grape

- Grape (Vitis)
- Color of berry skin: Blanc
- Species: Vitis vinifera
- Also called: See list of synonyms
- Origin: Spain
- VIVC number: 13375

Zalema is a white Spanish wine grape variety planted mainly in Condado de Huelva. As a varietal, Zalema produces heavy, full bodied wines.

== Synonyms ==
The origin of the word is, according to the R.A.E., from the Spanish Arabic assalám 'alík, peace be with you, an expression of greeting. Zalema is also known under the synonyms Del Pipajo, Perruna, Torrontes de Motilla, Ignobilis, Rebazo, Salemo, Salerno, Zalemo, and Zalemo Rebazo.
