= Monfí =

The monfíes (Spanish pronunciation: [moɱˈfi.es], sing. monfí; Arabic: منفي trans. munfī, "exiled, outlawed") were moriscos who lived during the sixteenth and seventeenth centuries in the mountains around Granada.

The first monfíes were people driven to the mountains as a result of the disorder and repression associated with the conquest of Granada by the Catholic Monarchs in 1492. Their numbers grew in subsequent decades as the new Castilian authorities put more pressure on the Muslims of Granada to convert to Christianity. The monfíes, who were largely of rural origin, occasionally formed mountain communities in which they could practice their faith openly, in contrast to most moriscos, who were forced either to abandon their religion or practice it covertly. Their chief occupation was banditry against Christians.

The monfíes figured prominently in the Morisco Revolt of Aben Humeya.

== See also ==
- Al-Andalus, the part of the Iberian Peninsula under Islamic rule.
- Andalusian Arabic, the former language of Moriscoes.
- Conversos, the baptized Jews and Muslims of the Iberian Peninsula and their descendants.
- Moors, the Muslim inhabitants of the Iberian Peninsula and North Africa.
- Morisco Revolt
