= Expulsion of Andalusi Christians in 1126 =

The Expulsion of the Christians from Al-Andalus in 1126 was a medieval event in Spain that consisted of the mass deportation to North Africa of the native Christian population of Al-Andalus (the Mozarabs). It was ordered by Emir Ali ibn Yusuf, who ruled the Almoravid Empire.

In addition to being expelled from their homes, they were prohibited from migrating to the Christian kingdoms in the north, as many Mozarabic families had been doing for almost three centuries during the process of the Reconquista.

== Background ==
=== Social Context ===
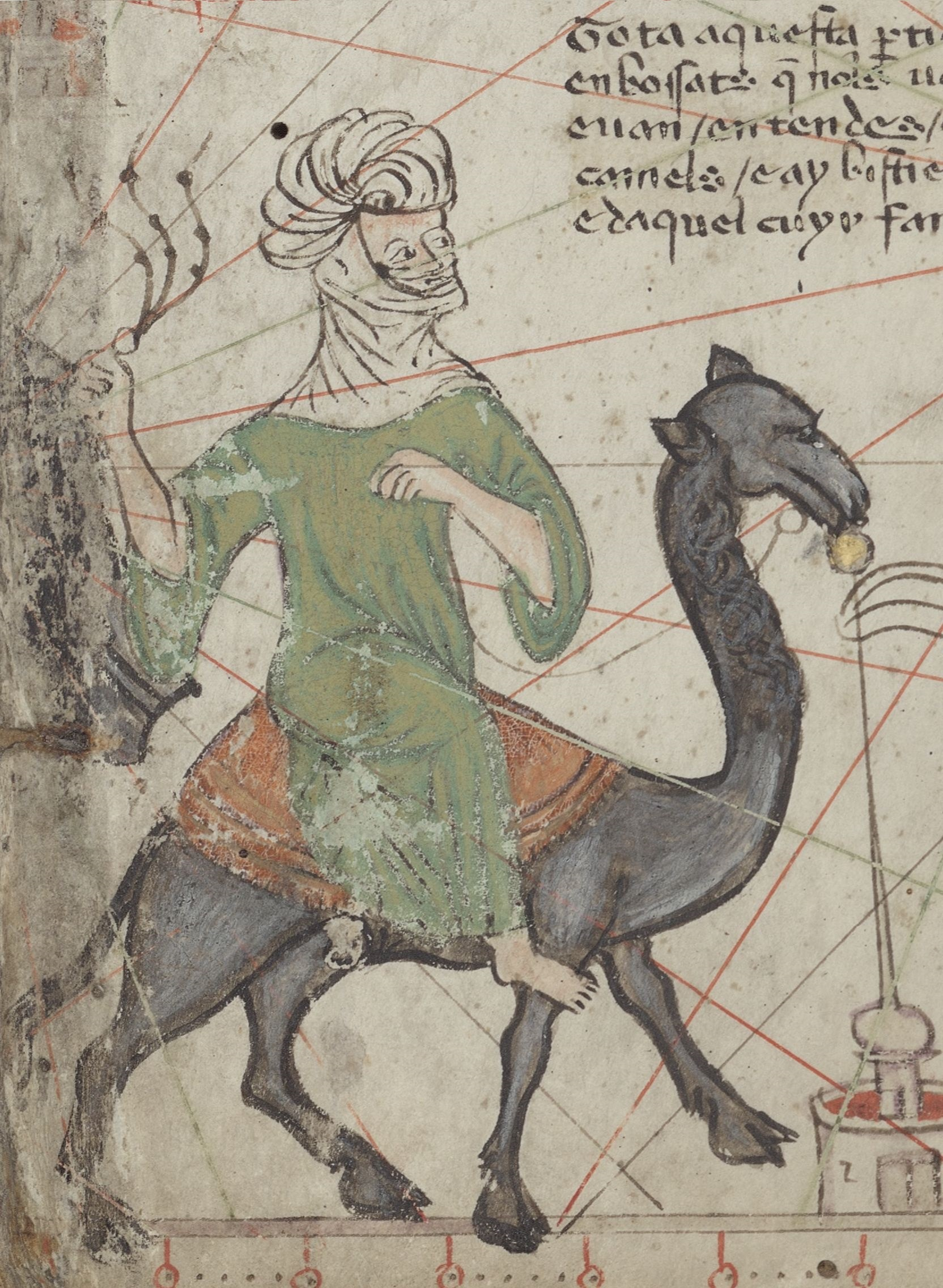
Depiction of an Almoravid emir in a 14th-century painting.

After the Umayyad conquest of Spain, the Muslim occupiers were a minority Arab-Berber elite ruling over a large mass of subjugated Christian inhabitants. The remoteness of the territory made it difficult to bring reinforcements to impose their religion. Thus, Muslim rulers established implicit pacts with Christian populations to avoid large-scale military confrontations with the native population (a "divide and conquer" policy). Under these terms, Iberian Christians were allowed to avoid conversion to Islam by agreeing to conditions negotiated by the Muslim occupiers. These conditions included granting a degree of religious tolerance to Catholics in exchange for paying heavy taxes (jizya) and recognizing the authority of the Islamic monarch, who, as their lord, would grant protection to his Christian vassals—similar to the vassal-lord relationship found in all medieval monarchies.

In practice, being a Christian in Al-Andalus meant living as a second-class citizen rather than in an ideal religious coexistence (which would later motivate the Reconquista). However, a status quo existed in which Muslims managed military defense and international representation, even if Christians' individual rights were not recognized. Christians were acknowledged as a distinct social group called Mozarabs. Nonetheless, this status could be revoked at any time, as emirs had the power to annul Christian privileges if they deemed that the vassal pact had been broken.

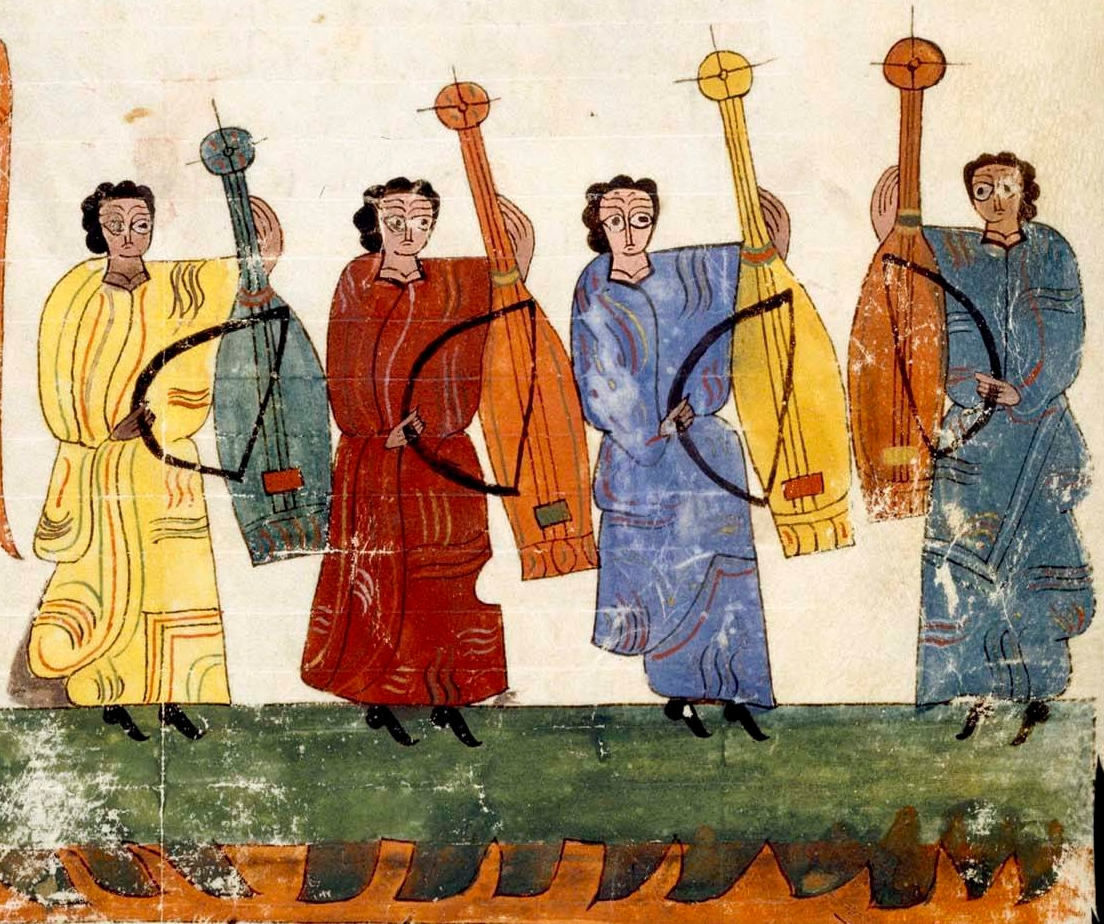
Mozarabic painting in a 10th-century manuscript.

Despite these conditions of coexistence, there were instances of mishandling and persecution against Christians almost from the beginning, as evidenced by the 9th-century martyrs of Córdoba or the persecution of 1099 in Granada, when Muslim emirs destroyed a Catholic church and severely mistreated the Mozarabic Christian community.

“And they [the Christians of Granada] had, outside the city, at two arrow shots (galwa: a unit of length, between 300 and 400 arms, translated as the range of an arrow shot with effort), in the direction of the Elvira Gate, on the road to QuIýar (present-day Güejar Sierra), a famous church claimed by one of the leaders of their religion and placed under the command of a Christian cavalry army (Rūm) by one of Granada's princes. It was unique in its construction and ornaments. Emir Yusuf b. Tashfin ordered its destruction after the legal scholars confirmed their desire for it and issued a fatwa to that effect. Ibn al-Sayrafi wrote: 'The people of the city went out to destroy it on Monday, the last day of Jumada in the year 492 / May 23, 1099. It was completely demolished, and everyone took what they could from its remains and sacred items. I have said. Its site is still known today, and its wall, still standing, testifies to the strength and solidity the temple once had. Part of it is the famous cemetery of Ibn Sahl b. Malik—may God have mercy on him. And when favorable winds blew for the enemy of God, the tyrant Ibn Rudmir, during the Almoravid era, before God shattered his arms in Fraga [in 1134], the tributary Christians of this province hoped for revenge and coveted the kingdom; then they turned to Ibn Rudmir (...)'.”

— Reinhart Dozy

=== Political-Military Context ===
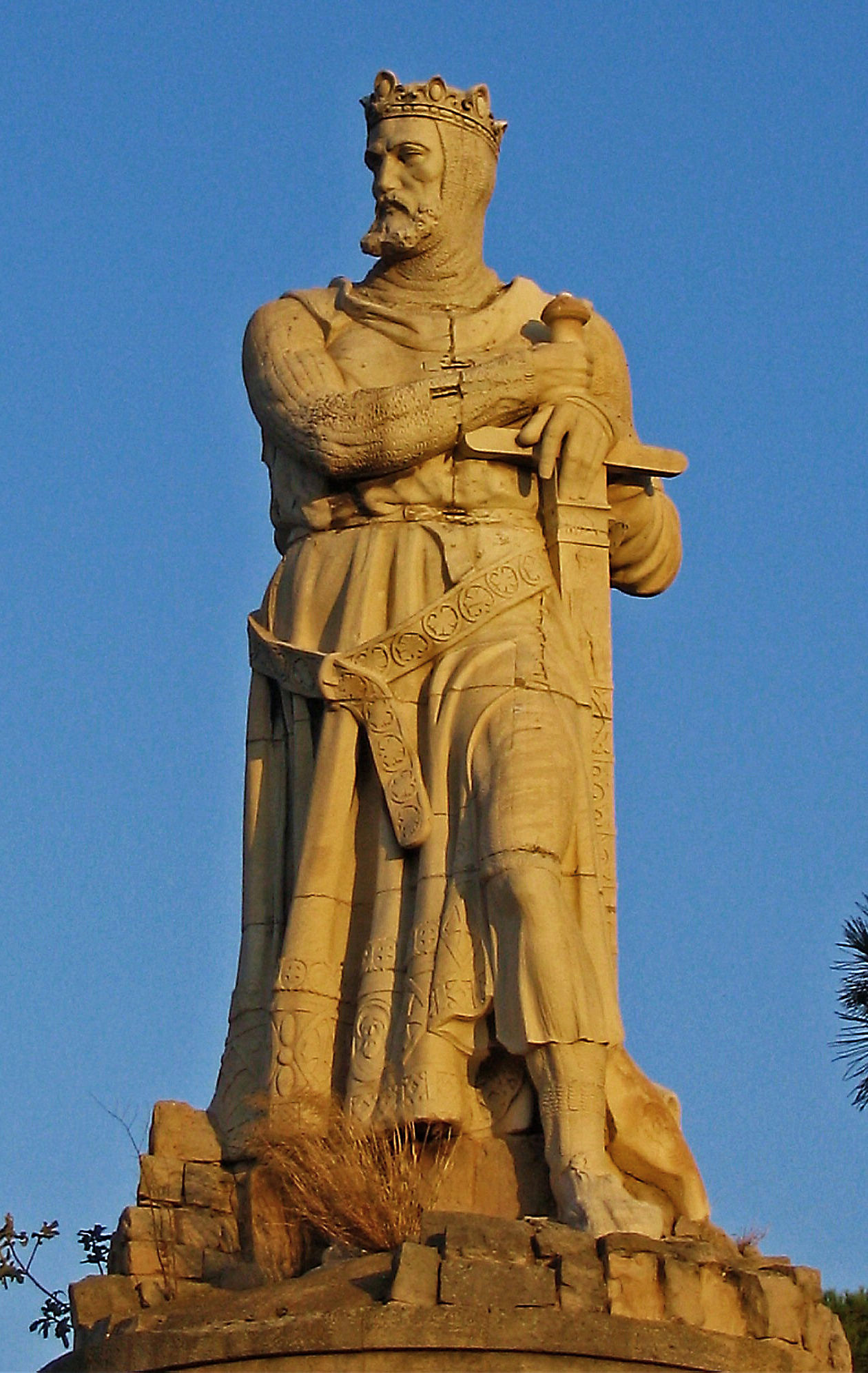
Statue of Alfonso the Battler.

In 1124, Alfonso the Battler (King of Aragon) received messages from some Mozarabic communities in Muslim Granada, led by Ibn al-Qalas, requesting his intervention due to the internal chaos among the Taifa kingdoms. They convinced the monarch that the fragility of the Andalusi realm (as they were planning to rebel against its governor, Abu Tahir Tamim ibn Yusuf) would make its conquest easy and its wealth attainable.

These hopes stemmed from Alfonso's prior military successes—besides defending his territory from Muslim incursions, he had conquered Zaragoza (1118), Tudela (1119), Calatayud (1120), and more, expanding through the Ebro Valley. This built great confidence in Alfonso, who, filled with warrior zeal, dreamed of completing the Reconquista and becoming emperor of all Spain, both Christian and Saracen.

So in September 1125, he set out with 4,000 knights from Aragon and Catalonia, and Mozarabs joined him as he advanced into Muslim territory. By January 1126, he had begun to besiege Granada. The local Mozarabic troops confessed they had staked everything on his campaign and knew that, if it failed, they would receive no forgiveness from Muslim authorities. The campaign did indeed fail, leading to Alfonso's retreat in June 1126—though not before saving around 10,000 Mozarabs who retreated with him and helped repopulate the Ebro Valley with Christians.

== Events ==
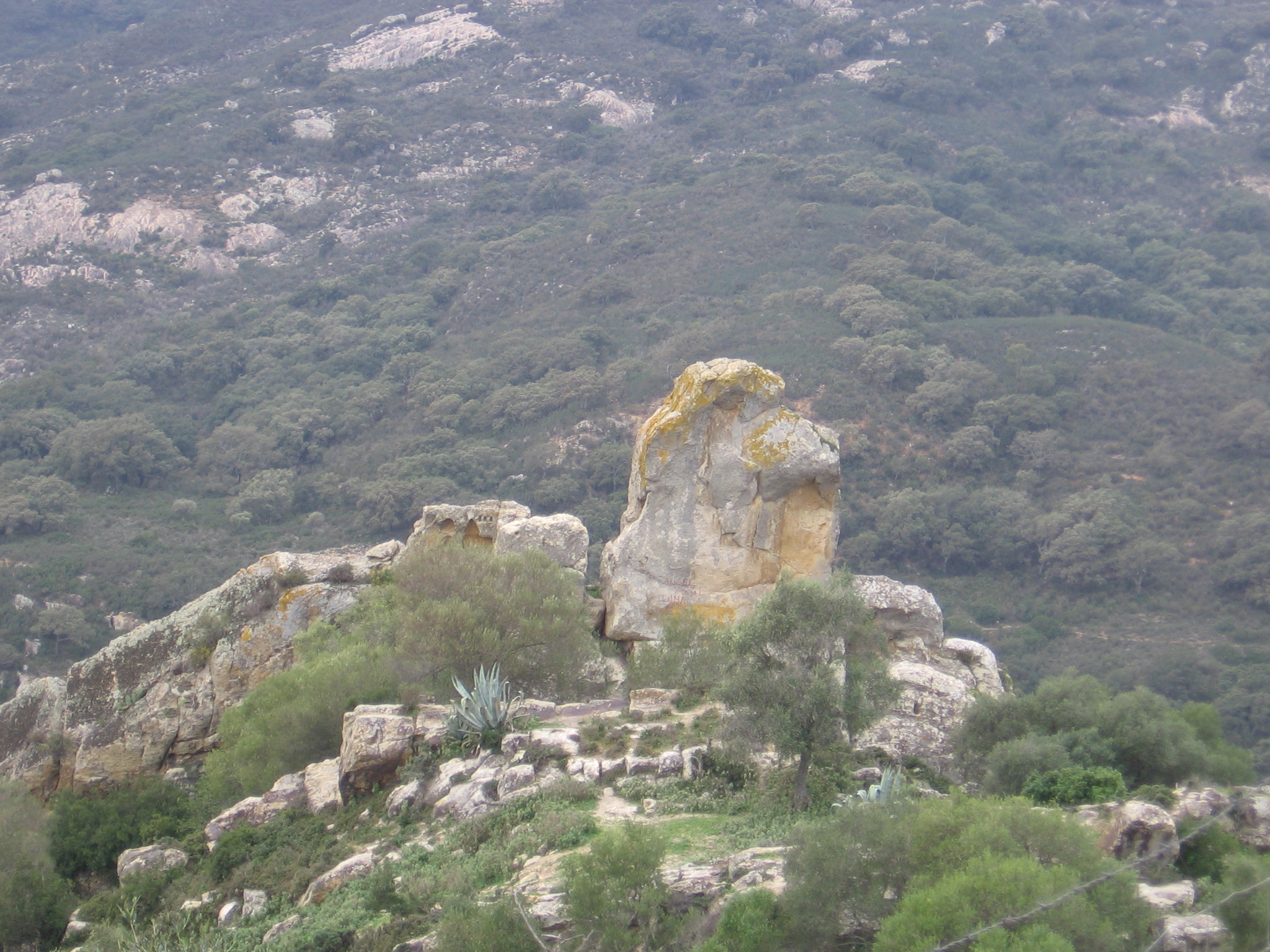
Ruins of a Mozarabic rock-hewn church in Jimena de la Frontera (Cádiz).

“If the situation of Andalusian Muslims was dire at the time, that of the Andalusian Christians was even worse.

The African Morabits showed them no leniency. The tolerance previously shown to Christians now seemed criminal and impious. To them, churches were the disgrace of the Peninsula, and they insisted to the monarch on the need to destroy them. Nearly as intolerant as they were, the monarch easily gave in. What did they do? It’s impossible to say; Muslim writers remain silent, and Andalusian Christians had no chroniclers. But we can assume the faqihs did not stop halfway; their hatred for Christians was too strong not to have incited them and persecuted them in every way.

For many years, the Christians suffered in silence. Finally, around 1125, at their limit, they pleaded with King Alfonso the Battler of Aragon—then the talk of Spain for his fame—to come liberate them from the unbearable yoke upon them. Alfonso answered their call and marched to Andalusia.”

— Reinhart Dozy

After Alfonso the Battler's expedition in 1125, the Moors of Al-Andalus were enraged with the Christians. Muslim authorities believed the Mozarabs, having supported the Aragonese invasion, had violated their vassal pact with the Muslim rulers, thus forfeiting their rights under the Islamic state.

The Qadi (governor and jurist) of Córdoba, Abū l-Walīd Muḥammad Ibn Rushd, traveled to Marrakesh (Al-Andalus was under Moroccan control at the time) to report to the Almoravid emir. He recommended drastic action.

Then, Ali ibn Yusuf—already considering jihad against Iberian Christians a priority—ordered the expulsion of Mozarabic Christians from his domains during Ramadan of 1126.

The order was executed by Ibn Rushd (grandfather of the famous philosopher Averroes), through a legal ruling (fatwa) that demanded the Christians be deported to North Africa. He justified this on the basis that the entire community had incited and supported the Aragonese expedition.

These Mozarabs, mostly from Granada, Córdoba, and Seville, left with their political and religious leaders and settled around Meknes and Salé. They lost many of their former rights and were mistreated during the journey, often forced into hard labor.

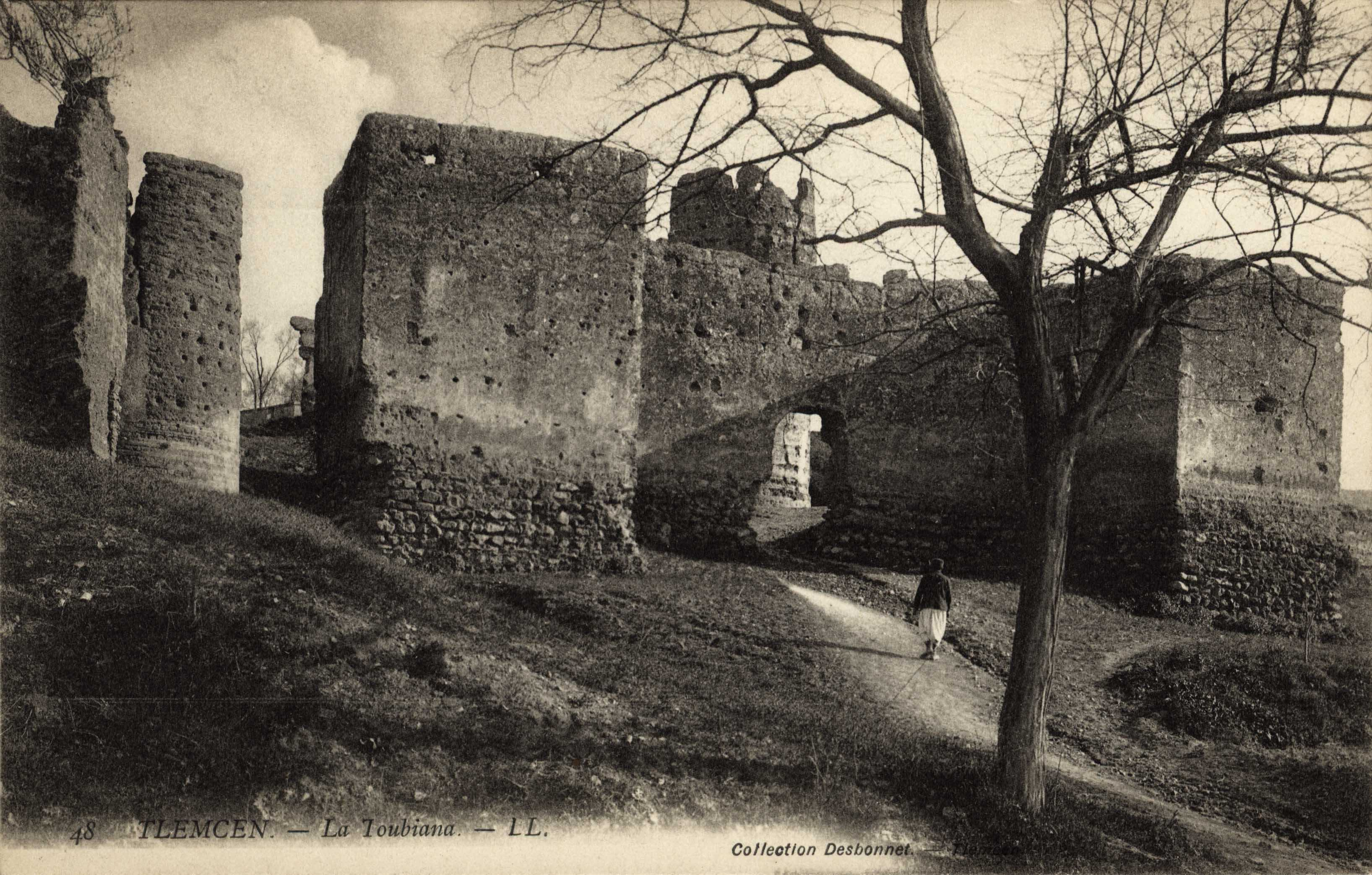
Ruins in Tlemcen (Algeria). In this city, a battle in 1143 between Almoravids and Almohads saw the participation of a Christian militia of 4,000 knights, made up of expelled Mozarabs, adventurers, and slaves from the Christian north.

Meanwhile, Ali ibn Yusuf hoped to transfer Mozarabic soldiers from Andalusia to help defend Morocco. He granted them the same protection (dhimma) they had lost in Spain—but only applied in Africa. He even authorized Catholic priests to build a church in Marrakesh, where they continued their religious duties. However, in exchange, the entire community was required to enroll in the military register (diwan), serving as the emir's personal guard and defending the Almoravids from the Almohads.

== Consequences ==
Although further deportations took place in 1138 and 1170, the 1126 expulsion effectively wiped out the Mozarabic community in Granada, Córdoba, and Seville for the rest of the century. Public Christian worship ceased among those who remained in Al-Andalus. Many tried to avoid deportation by converting to Islam or fleeing to the northern Christian kingdoms, though Muslim forces tried to capture them.

Those who remained were dispossessed, publicly humiliated, chained, or even martyred for their faith. Still, as of 1138, important Mozarabic communities survived in rural areas and smaller cities.

With the arrival of the Almohads and the expulsion of Jews from Al-Andalus in 1146, massacres and enslavements of remaining Mozarabs also took place. A chronicler wrote:

“The people that the common folk call muzmotos [referring to the Almohads] came from Africa… and killed the Christians known as Mozarabs and the Jews who had lived there since ancient times. They took their women, houses, and wealth.”

By 1162, they were nearly extinct, facing increased repression during Muslim dynastic struggles. The remaining former Mozarabs (now crypto-Christians) earned the hostility of the authorities.

Furthermore, Christian properties were confiscated by Muslims (unless a Mozarab from Africa could prove ownership and was allowed to sell them), and churches were converted into mosques.

“The answer [is as follows]: The waqf (endowments) of the dhimmis have no sanctity (hurma). If the donor is alive and wishes to recover or sell them, he may do so freely. If the waqf is old and in dhimmi territory, nothing will prevent such action. If the Muslim authority sees fit, after the dhimmis have been expelled from their church, to convert it into a mosque, this is the best course. Muslims who replace the dhimmis need a mosque, and the imam should build one for them—preferably converting the church. That and its endowments become public property after the Christians lose ownership. They cannot claim it anymore, unless the original donor is alive to reclaim or sell it. If not, they may only use it while residing there. If they abandon it, it becomes Muslim property by default. The conversion of a church into a mosque, along with its associated goods and services, is justified by the offense it causes the infidels: their house of impiety and idolatry becomes a place where God is worshipped and Islamic law is upheld.”

— Fatwa of Qadi 'Iyad

Among those who stayed in North Africa, cultural activities thrived within the Christian community. Arabic translations of the Gospels were made, and a community of Christian soldiers in service of the Moroccan Muslims grew stronger. These soldiers continued serving under the Almohad Empire and later the Marinid Sultanate.

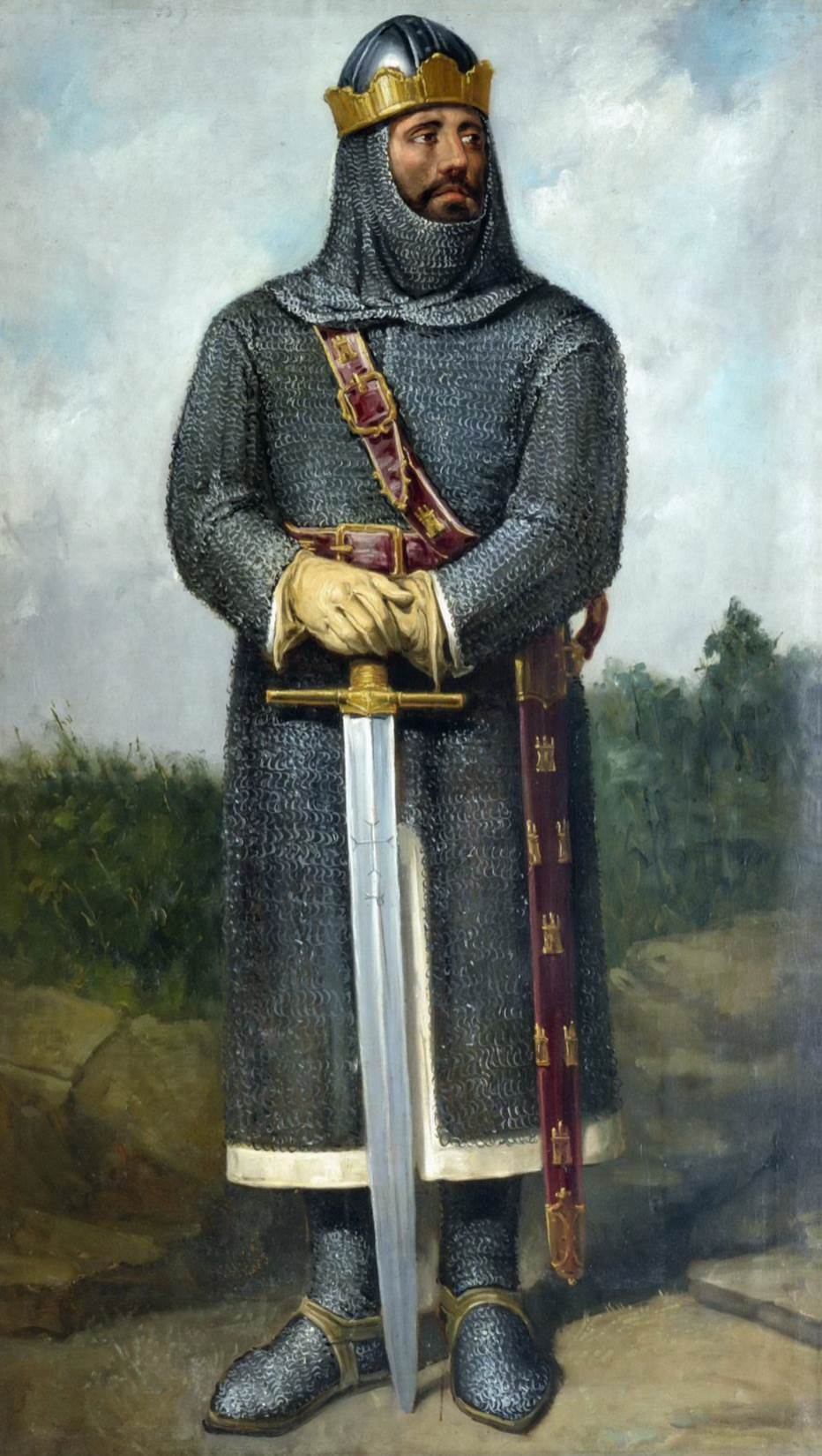
Alfonso VII the Emperor, King of Castile and León.

Thousands of exiled Mozarabs returned to Spain two decades later, settling in Christian Toledo. According to Francisco Javier Simonet:

“Around the year 1150, many thousands of these Christians—Mozarabs and freed captives—who had served the Almoravids in Africa, seeing their crumbling empire could no longer be sustained, returned to Spain with their families, priests, and bishops. Tired of fighting for the Moors, they went to Toledo, where Emperor Alfonso VII is presumed to have welcomed them favorably. The Latin Chronicle of this monarch praises these Christians who, amid infidels and continuous war, led wholly military lives yet faithfully preserved their faith, worship, and Church. Still, many Christians, mostly Spaniards, remained in Africa…”

— Francisco Javier Simonet

Mozarab militias remained active in North Africa until around 1380, when King Juan I of Castile retrieved them and offered them land in his kingdom. They returned to Seville with the authorization of the then-Emir of Morocco.
