= Listán de Huelva =

Variety of grape

Listán de Huelva is a white wine grape grown mainly in the province of Huelva, in the region of Andalusia, Spain.
