= Manzanilla, Spain =

Manzanilla
- Municipality
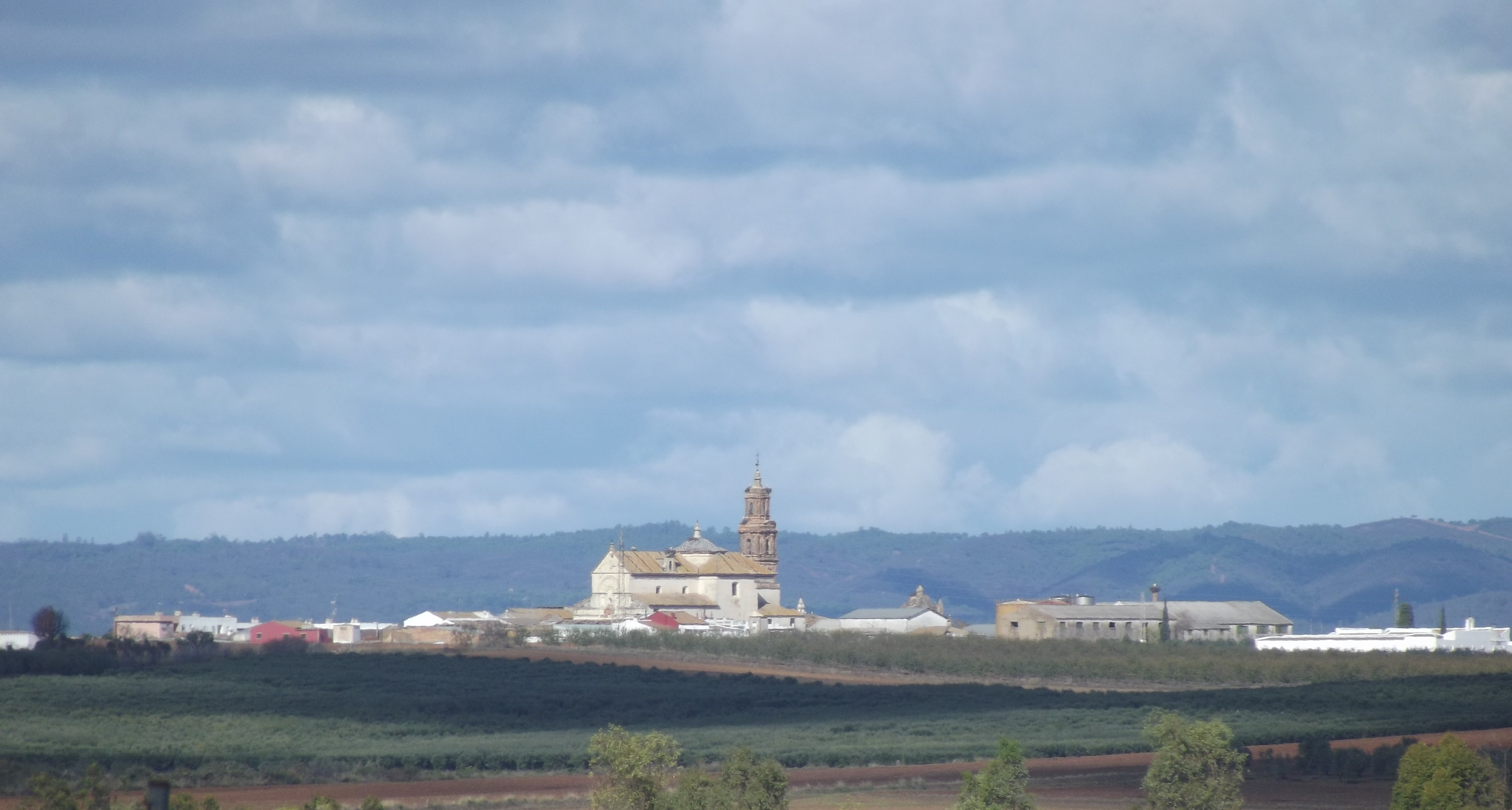
- View of Manzanilla from the South

- Flag Coat of arms

- Location of Manzanilla in Spain
- Coordinates: 37°23′N 6°25′W
- Country: Spain
- Autonomous community: Andalusia
- Province: Huelva

Area
  - Total: 40 km^{2} (15 sq mi)
- Elevation: 164 m (538 ft)

Population (2025-01-01)
  - Total: 2,214
  - Density: 55/km^{2} (140/sq mi)
- Time zone: UTC+1 (CET)
  - Summer (DST): UTC+2 (CEST)
- Website: http://www.ayuntamientodemanzanilla.es/es/

Manzanilla is a town and municipality located in the province of Huelva, Spain. According to the 2025 municipal register, it has a population of 2,214 inhabitants.

== See also ==
- List of municipalities in Huelva
