= Rebellion of the Alpujarras (1568–1571) =

Morisco revolt in Granada against Castile

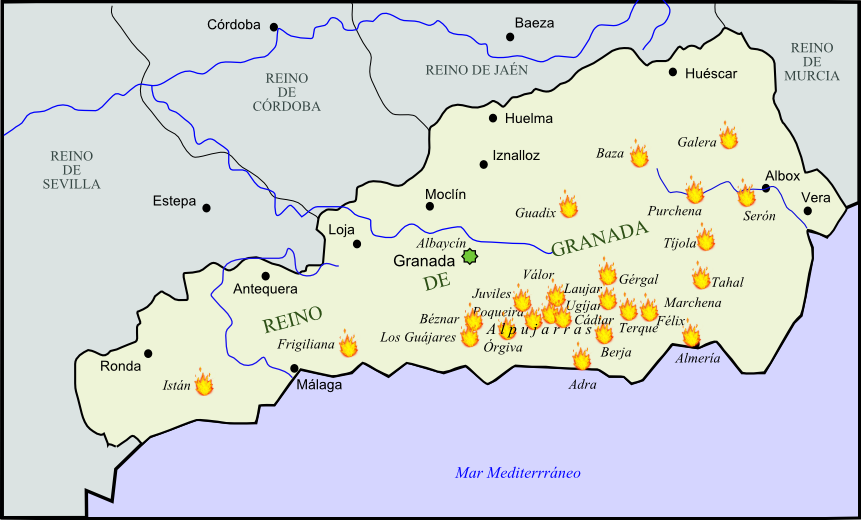
- Principal centres of the Morisco Revolt
Date	24 December 1568 – March 1571
Location	The Alpujarras, Kingdom of Granada, Crown of Castile
Result	Spanish victory

Belligerents
Spain	Moriscos rebels Regency of Algiers

Commanders and leaders
(Spain) John of Austria (Spain) Marquis of Mondéjar (Spain) Marquis of Los Vélez (Spain) Duke of Sessa (Spain) Luis Quijada	Aben Humeya X Aben Aboo X Faraj ibn Faraj † (Regency of Algiers) Occhiali

Strength
2,200 (initially); 20,000 (1570)	Unknown; Christian estimate from French and Genoan ambassadors in court of Madrid: 4,000 (initially); 25,000 (1570)

Casualties and losses
3,000-6,000 killed	Unknown

The second rebellion of the Alpujarras (Arabic: ثورة البشرات الثانية; 1568–1571), sometimes called the War of the Alpujarras or the Morisco Revolt, was triggered by Philip II of Spain's Pragmatic Sanction of 1567 and was the second Morisco revolt against the Castilian Crown in the mountainous Alpujarra region and on the Granada Altiplano region, northeast of the city of Granada. The rebels were Moriscos, the nominally Catholic descendants of the Mudéjares (Muslims under Castilian rule) following the first rebellion of the Alpujarras.

By 1250, the Reconquest of Spain by the Catholic powers had left only the Emirate of Granada, in southern Spain. In 1492, Granada city fell to the Catholic Monarchs—Isabella I of Castile and Ferdinand II of Aragon—and under the terms of capitulation the whole Muslim-majority region came under Christian rule.

The Muslim inhabitants of the city, however, soon revolted against Christian rule in 1499, followed by the mountain villages: this revolt was suppressed by 1501. The Muslims under Christian rule (until then known as Mudejares) were then obliged to convert to Christianity, becoming a nominally Catholic population known as "Moriscos".

Discontent among the new "Moriscos" led to a second rebellion, led by a Morisco known as Aben Humeya, starting in December 1568 and lasting till March 1571. This violent conflict took place mainly in the mountainous Alpujarra region, on the southern slopes of the Sierra Nevada between the city of Granada and the Mediterranean coast, and is often known as the War of the Alpujarras. (Note: The plural "Alpujarras" is often used, because the area now lies in two Spanish provinces, Granada and Almeria, but there is probably an earlier origin. Alpujarra has multiple proposed Arabic etymologies, the most accepted being "Al-Bugsharra" (land of pastures). A pre-Celtic origin, Al, meaning "a high mountain", as elsewhere in Europe, has also been proposed.)

The rebellion reportedly took on a fanatical character, with the torturing and murder of priests and sacristans, and the destruction and profanation of churches. In this the bands of monfíes -outlaws who had left the villages and roamed in the mountains and joined the rebellion- played a large part.

Most of the Morisco population was then expelled from the Kingdom of Granada and was dispersed throughout the Kingdom of Castille (modern-day Castile, Extremadura, and Andalusia). As this left many smaller settlements in Granada almost empty, Catholic settlers were brought in from other parts of the country to repopulate them.

== Background ==
=== Fall of Granada and the 1499–1501 Muslim revolts ===
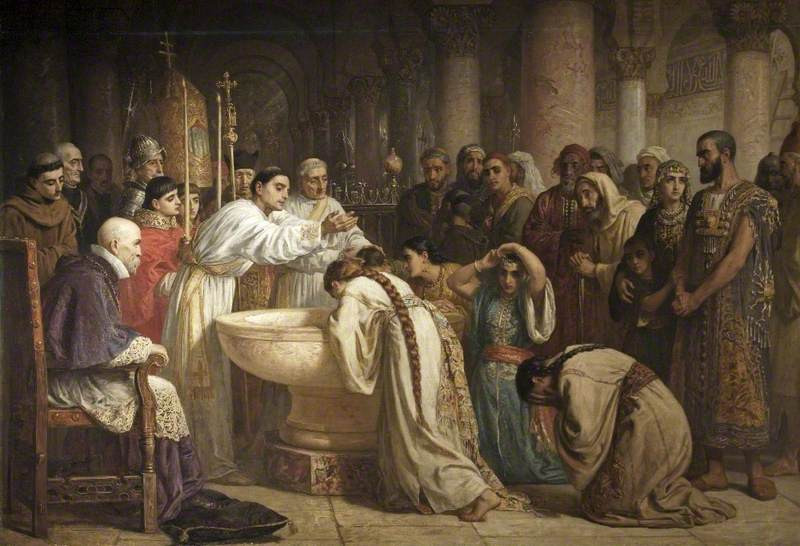
Forced conversion under Francisco Jiménez de Cisneros was one of the main causes of the rebellions.

The Kingdom of Granada was the last Muslim-ruled state in Spain. After a long siege, the city of Granada fell to the Catholic Monarchs, Ferdinand and Isabel, in 1492. The Muslim population was initially tolerated under the terms of the Treaty of Granada: they were allowed to stay in their dwellings, to be judged according to their own laws, and would not be obliged to convert to Christianity.

However, they did come under pressure to convert, and growing discontent led to an uprising in 1499 in Granada city, quickly put down, and in the following year two more serious revolts in the mountain villages of the Alpujarra—the region below the Sierra Nevada. Ferdinand himself led an army into the area. There were also revolts in the western parts of the Kingdom. Suppression by the Catholic forces was severe, with the most violent episode occurring in Laujar de Andarax, where two hundred Muslims were burnt in the local mosque.

This revolt enabled the Catholics to claim that the Muslims had violated the terms of the Treaty of Granada, which were therefore withdrawn. Throughout the region, Muslims were now forced to choose between conversion to Christianity or exile. The vast majority chose conversion and became known as "Moriscos" or "New Christians", though many continued to speak Andalusian Arabic and to maintain their Moorish customs.

=== Causes of the second rebellion ===
In 1526, Charles V (Charles I of Spain)—issued an Edict under which laws against heresy (e.g. Muslim practices by "New Christians") would be strictly enforced; among other restrictions, it forbade the use of Arabic and the wearing of Moorish dress. The Moriscos managed to get this suspended for forty years by the payment of a large sum (80,000 ducados).

Since now all remaining Moors were officially Christian ("Moriscos"), mosques could be destroyed or turned into churches. There was little or no follow-up in terms of explaining Christianity: indeed, the priests themselves were mostly too ignorant to do so. On the other hand, they punished Moriscos who failed to participate in Sunday Mass; Moriscos had to learn—in Latin—the Lord's Prayer, the Ave Maria, the Credo, and the Ten Commandments; children had to be baptised and marriage had to be under Christian rites. Inevitably, tension built up.

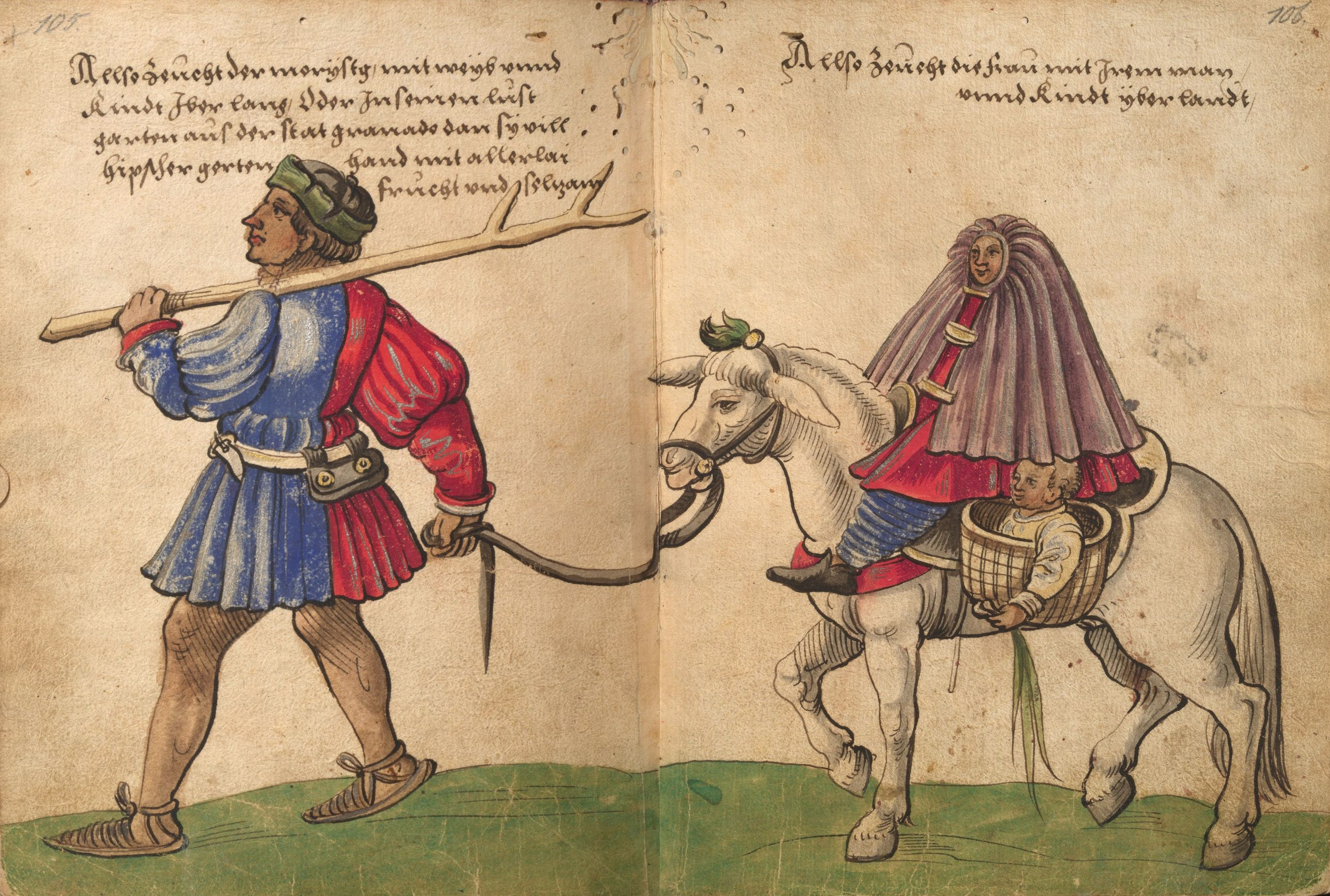
A Morisco family walking in the country, by Christoph Weiditz, 1529.

The archbishop of Granada, convinced that the Moriscos were maintaining their customs and traditions and would never become real Christians, called in 1565 a synod of the bishops of the kingdom of Granada. It was agreed that the policy of persuasion should be replaced by one of repression, and that the measures of 1526 should now be applied. This meant prohibition of all the distinctive Morisco practices: language, clothing, public baths, religious ceremonies, etc. Moreover, in each place where the Moriscos lived at least a dozen "Old Christians" (i.e. not those who had been supposedly converted) should be installed; Morisco houses should be inspected on Fridays, Saturdays, and feast-days to ensure that they were not practicing Quranic rites; the heads of household should be closely watched to ensure that they were setting a good example; their sons should be taken to Old Castile at the cost of their parents, to be brought up learning Christian customs and forgetting those of their origins.

Philip II, who had become King in 1556, gave his approval: the result was the Pragmática Sanción of 1 January 1567. The Moriscos tried to negotiate its suspension, as in 1526, but this King was inflexible. A Morisco leader, Francisco Núñez Muley, made a statement protesting against the injustices committed against the Moriscos: "Day by day our situation worsens, we are maltreated in every way; and this is done by judges and officials… How can people be deprived of their own language, with which they were born and brought up? In Egypt, Syria, Malta and elsewhere there are people like us who speak, read and write in Arabic, and they are Christians like us." The American historian Henry Charles Lea wrote: "The Moriscos had come to the parting of the ways; there was no middle course and they had the naked alternative of submission or rebellion."

As the failure of their appeals became evident, the Moriscos of Granada began to prepare for rebellion, holding secret meetings in the Moorish quarter of Granada, the Albaicín. The authorities arrested Moriscos who they thought might be conspiring; they also made plans to expel Moriscos from the Kingdom and replace them with "Old Christians" (i.e. not recent converts). After a year of fruitless negotiations, in 1568 the Morisco leaders decided to take up arms.

== Rebellion of 1568–71 (War of the Alpujarras) ==
In the months following publication of the Pragmatica on 1 January 1567, the Moriscos began to prepare their rebellion. Weapons, flour, oil, and other provisions were stored in caves which were inaccessible and safe, enough for six years.

The principal leaders, including some from the Alpujarra, held meetings in private houses in the Albaicín, and from there issued their orders.

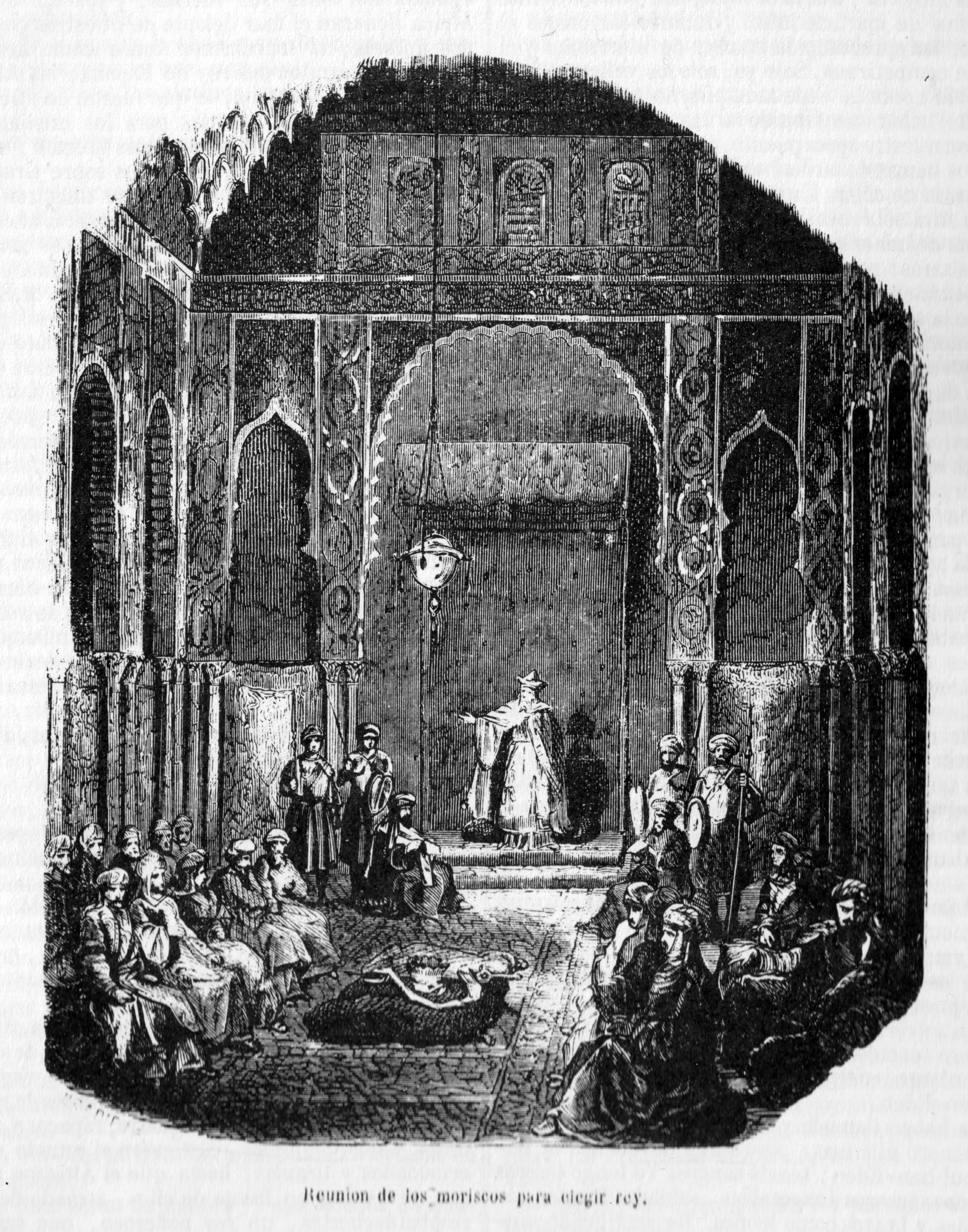
The acclamation of Aben Humeya as king of the Moriscos

At a meeting on 17 September 1568 it was proposed that they should elect a chieftain to lead the revolt. The rebellion started on Christmas Eve in the village of Béznar in the Lecrin valley, when Hernando de Córdoba y Valór was named King: in a solemn ceremony, they clothed him in purple according to the old ritual for the kings of Granada, and many rich Moriscos attended, wearing black garments. He was chosen because he descended from the lineage of the caliphs of Córdoba, the Omeyas, and he therefore took the Moorish name Aben Humeya (or "Omeya"). Numerous other places in the tahas (districts) of Órgiva, Poqueira, Juviles, and other Morisco villages in the Alpujarra followed suit.

The first action by the rebels was in Granada city: it was led by Aben Humeya's "grand vizir", Farax Aben Farax, who on that same night of 24–25 December entered the Albaicín (the Moorish quarter) with a group of monfíes – outlaws who for one reason or another had left the villages and roamed in the mountains. His aim was to persuade the Morisco inhabitants to join the revolt, but he had little success – only a few hundred followed him. This failure in the capital had a decisive effect on the course of the campaign throughout the Kingdom of Granada.

The rebellion reportedly took on a fanatic character, with the torturing and murder of priests and sacristans, the destruction and profanation of churches. In this the bands of monfies played a large part. When a rumor spread in 1568 that the Ottomans had finally come to liberate them, Muslims near Granada, “believing that the days under Christian rule were over, went berserk. Priests all over the countryside were attacked, mutilated, or murdered; some were burned alive; one was sewed inside a pig and barbequed; the pretty Christian girls were assiduously raped, some sent off to join the harems of Moroccan and Algerian potentates.”

=== First phase ===
The Spanish campaign was led by the Marqués de Mondéjar in the west of the Alpujarra and the Marqués de Los Vélez in the east. Mondéjar, coming from Granada in January 1569, had quick success, over terrain which should have favoured the defenders. He overcame the first natural obstacle – a bridge at Tablate, which the Moors had partially destroyed – and reached Órgiva in time to rescue Christians held captive in the tower.

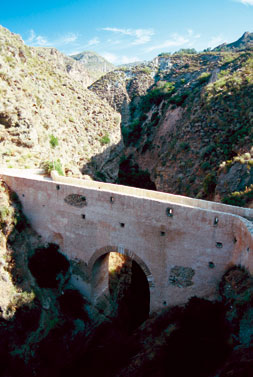
Tablate bridge

The first major battle was fought in a river valley east of Órgiva, where the Moors were defeated. An advance detachment then contrived to cross a narrow ravine (picture) and climb a steep mountainside to reach the village of Bubión, in the Poqueira valley, where Aben Humeya had made his headquarters and the Moors had stored equipment and valuables. They were soon joined by the Marqués and the bulk of his army, taking a longer but safer route.

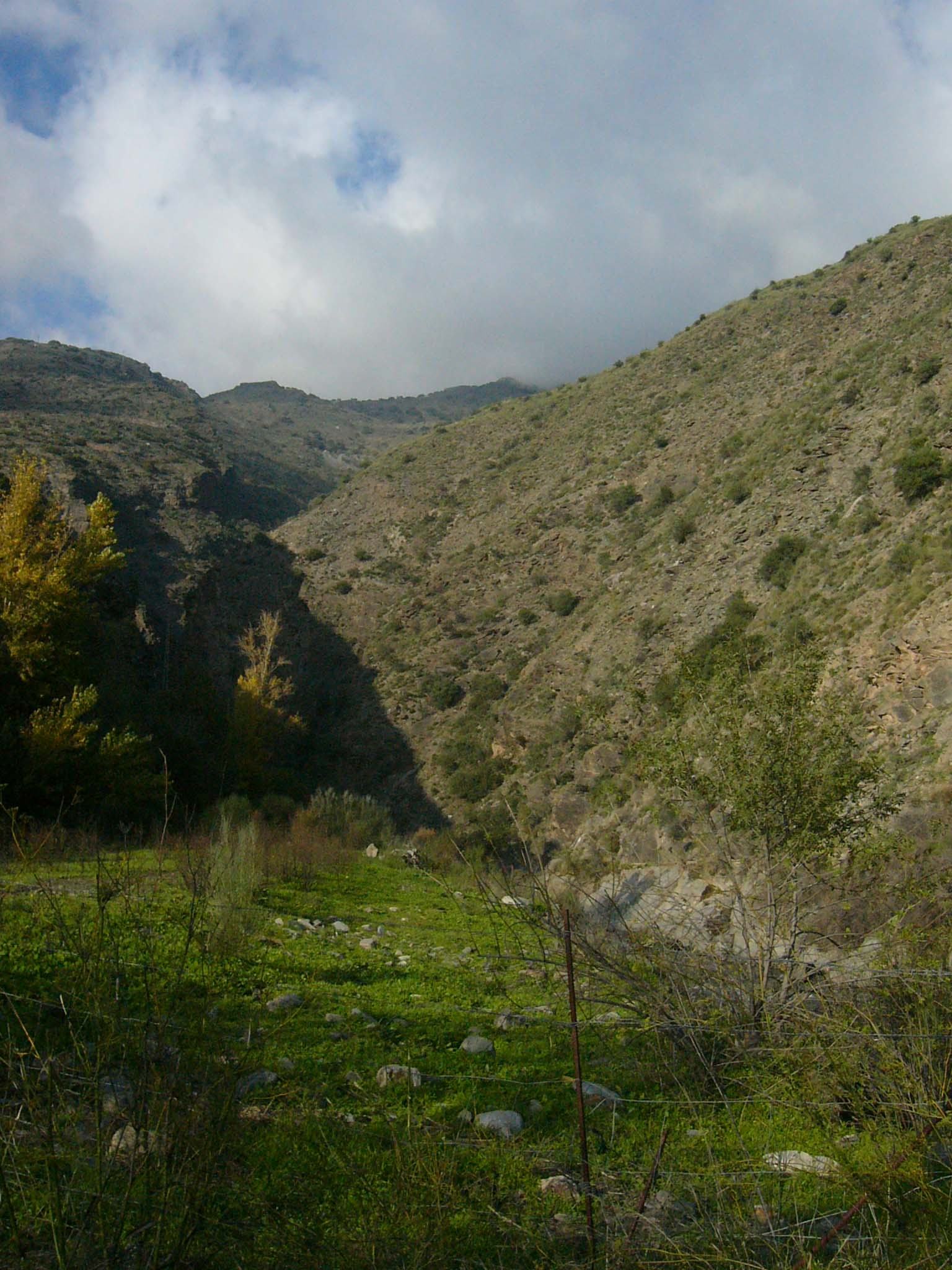
Approach to the Poqueira valley

In the next few days the army crossed the mountains and descended on Pórtugos and Pitres, again freeing Christian captives in the churches. From there the way was open to the villages further east.

The American historian Henry Charles Lea wrote of Mondéjar's "short but brilliant campaign... Through heavy snows and intense cold and over almost inaccessible mountains he fought battle after battle, giving the enemy no respite and following up every advantage gained. The Moriscos speedily lost heart and sought terms of surrender… By the middle of February [1569] the rebellion was practically suppressed. Aben Humeya was a wanderer, hiding in caves by day and seeking shelter by night in houses which had letters of surety."

Indeed, at Pórtugos some Moorish leaders had attempted to negotiate surrender terms with Mondéjar, who replied that he would intercede with King Philip, but that in the meantime the punishment of rebels must continue. If he did report to the King, this did him no good as it reinforced charges against him of undue clemency. In fact, the Christian campaign was compromised by a long-standing enmity between the two commanders, and this was fomented by the Chancery in Granada, which on several occasions sent complaints about Mondéjar to King Philip. (Note: The Marquis of Mondéjar (Iñigo López de Mendoza y Mendoza) lived from 1512 till 1580 and was the third in the Mondéjar line. In 1560 he was ambassador to the Pope in Rome. He was capitan-general of Granada, and thus commanded the Spanish troops at the beginning of the Alpujarran war. After being dismissed from this command, he became viceroy in Valencia, then in Naples.)

The subsequent campaign was marked by excesses committed by the troops: this was not a disciplined army but consisted largely of untrained volunteers, who were not paid but counted on the loot they could gather. The chronicler Pérez de Hita wrote that half of them were "the worst scoundrels in the world, motivated only by the desire to steal, sack and destroy the Morisco villages."

There were also many acts of vengeance by Moriscos against "Old Christians". Some priests were flayed alive, being reminded of their severity towards those who did not attend mass, to women who would not uncover their faces, and generally to those who continued practicing their old rites. Churches were systematically set on fire and looted; likewise the houses of the priests and those of Christians in general.

Both sides sold as slaves many of their captives. The Moriscos sold Christians to merchants from North Africa, in exchange for weapons. For their part, those whom the Christian soldiers captured, especially women, were regarded as war booty, and they were entitled to keep the takings for themselves as the Crown renounced the fifth part of the proceeds normally due. Chiefs and officers also took prisoners for themselves, including children. The Crown itself did benefit from the sale of slaves, as in the case of many of the Moors from Juviles who were sold at the market in Granada for the benefit of the King.

=== Second phase ===
This lasted from March 1569 until January 1570. Now the initiative lay with the Morisco rebels, who had gained support as towns in the plain and elsewhere joined the revolt. Thus their number rose from 4,000 in 1569 to 25,000 in 1570, including some Berbers and Turks. Their tactic was to ambush their opponents, avoiding combat on open ground, relying on their knowledge of the intricate terrain of the sierras and occupying the heights from which they could launch audacious attacks.

The Spanish navy was called upon to bring reinforcements to the army, and to protect the Granada coast against Ottoman reinforcements from North Africa.

=== Third phase ===
This began in 1570, after King Philip had relieved the Marqués of Mondéjar of his command and appointed in his place his own half-brother, Don John of Austria, to take overall command, and the Marquis of Los Vélez to pursue operations in the eastern part of the kingdom.

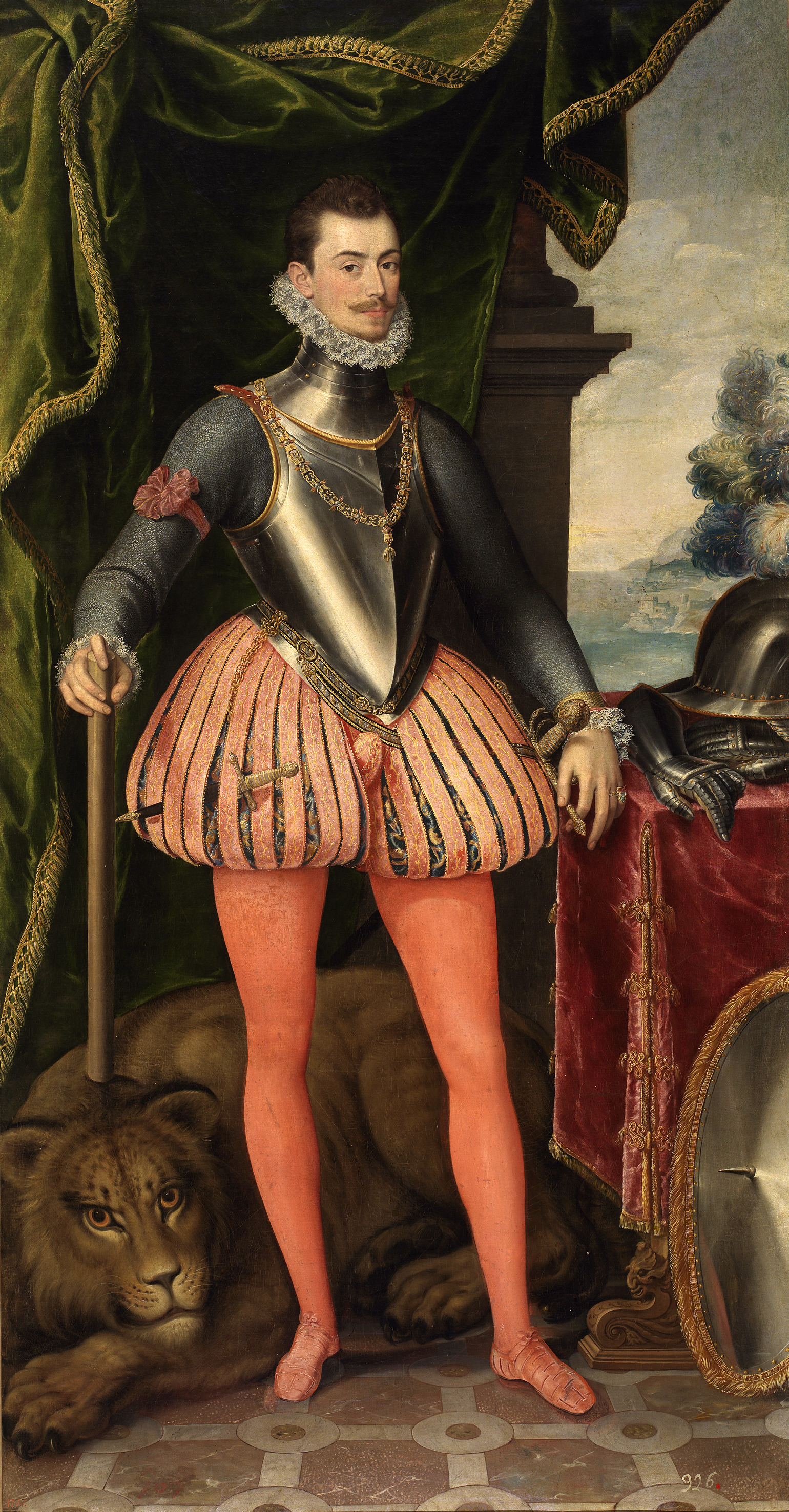
Don Juan de Austria, by Juan Pantoja de la Cruz.

Lea describes Vélez as "ambitious, arrogant and opinionated… He thrust himself into the war and mismanaged it at every turn, but he was a favorite of the king, who supported him through it all… Great preparations were made to give Don John a force which befitted his dignity and should speedily crush all resistance. The towns and cities were summoned to furnish their quotas and the Spanish ambassador at Rome was ordered to bring the Italian galleys to Spain, to aid the home squadron in guarding the coast and intercepting succors from Africa, and also to convey the tercio of Naples" (a battalion of about three thousand regular troops).

This was a big mobilisation to deal with a revolt by a mountain people, with no military training nor organisation, and ill-equipped with weaponry. But King Philip was obsessed by his troubles abroad and clearly felt he had to eliminate this problem on his doorstep. An Ottoman fleet was raiding the Spanish coasts and it had captured the Balearic Islands in 1558. In the Spanish Netherlands, the preaching of Calvinist leaders had led to riots in 1566 and to open warfare in 1568: Philip did not want trouble in his own backyard. Moreover, like Catholic leaders everywhere in Europe, he was determined to stamp out "heresy" of all kinds – and the Moors had by now been formally classified as heretics.

Don John arrived at Granada in April 1569. Returning to Lea's account: "Conflicting opinions led to prolonged discussions during which nothing was done; the campaign went to pieces; the pacified Moriscos, reduced to despair by the withdrawal of Mondéjar, sent back their safeguards and withdrew their oaths of allegiance and with them went many places that had previously remained loyal… Granada was virtually besieged, for the Moriscos ravaged the Vega [the plain] up to the gates… The rebellion, which had hitherto been confined to the Alpujarras and Sierra Nevada, spread on the one side to the mountain of Almería and on the other to those of Málaga. The whole land was aflame and it looked as though the power of Spain was inadequate to extinguish the conflagration."

In an attack on Albuñuelas, the Spanish troops killed all the men who did not escape and brought back fifteen hundred women and children who were divided among the soldiers as slaves. In October that year the king proclaimed "a war of fire and blood" (una guerra a fuego y a sangre) – no longer just a matter of punishing a rebellion. He also gave free rein (campo franco) to the soldiers to take whatever plunder they could find, whether slaves, cattle, or property.

In January 1570 Don John launched his new campaign with a force of 12,000 men; another contingent led by the Duke of Sessa had 8,000 foot and 350 horse. There was renewed fighting in the Pitres-Poqueira area in April 1570. As the campaign went on and villages were captured, the Catholic forces were much reduced by desertions.

On 10 February, after a two-month siege, Don Juan conquered Galera and ordered its destruction; in March he took Serón; and at the end of April he headed for the Alpujarra, setting up his headquarters at Padules. There he was joined by a second army under the Duke of Sessa, which had left Granada in February and had crossed the Alpujarra from west to east. At the same time, a third army had come from Antequera to reach the sierra of Bentomiz, another focus of the rebellion, at the beginning of March.

=== Fourth phase ===
This lasted from April 1570 until the spring of 1571. Catholic forces were greatly reinforced with infantry and cavalry. Led by Don John and the Duke of Sessa they launched a new campaign, invading the Alpujarra, destroying houses and crops, putting men to the sword and taking prisoner all the women, children, and elderly people whom they found in their path. "Spain had strained every nerve and had raised an overwhelming force to accomplish what Mondéjar had done with a few thousand men a twelve months earlier."

In May, King Aben Aboo at last accepted surrender terms, under which those who gave themselves up and handed over their weapons would have their lives spared. But when some Berbers appeared with stories of large reinforcements on their way, Aben Aboo decided to fight on. The reports here are muddled: some say that three galleys which had just arrived from Algiers with arms, munitions, and food turned back because they heard Aboo was surrendering. However this may be, no such help reached the rebels, but the Catholics were given an excuse to resume hostilities: "The sierra, in September 1570, was attacked simultaneously from both ends with a war of ruthless devastation, destroying all harvests, killing the men and bringing in women and children by the thousand as slaves. What few prisoners were taken were executed or sent to the galleys."

This advance by the royal troops opened a breach between those of the Moriscos who wanted to continue the fight and those who argued for seeking terms of surrender. In May, following a meeting at Andarax, many rebels fled to North Africa. Soon afterwards, the leader of those who favoured surrender, Hernando El Habaqui, was executed on the order of Aben Aboo.

Although from October 1570 many Moriscos gave themselves up, several thousand went on fighting. Most of them took shelter in caves, but many of these died from suffocation when the Christian troops lit fires at the entrances.

In 1571 John of Austria finally succeeded in suppressing the rebellion in the Alpujarra. The last rebels, after losing the fortress of Juviles, were killed in their caves: among them Aben Aboo who was stabbed to death by his own followers in a cave near Bérchules. Resistance then collapsed.

Diego Hurtado de Mendoza – the more enlightened of the contemporary Spanish sources – made a bitter comment: "Day by day we fought our enemies, in the cold or the heat, hungry, lacking munitions, suffering continual injuries and deaths until we could confront our enemies: a warlike tribe, well-armed and confident in terrain which favoured them. Finally they were driven from their houses and possessions; men and women were chained together; captured children were sold to the highest bidder or carried away to distant places… It was a dubious victory, with such consequences that one might doubt whether those whom God wished to punish were ourselves or the enemy."

== Extent of the rebellion ==
When the rebellion began, the Kingdom of Granada counted barely 150,000 inhabitants, most of them Moriscos. The exact number who rebelled is unknown, but the ambassadors of France and of the Republic of Genoa at the Madrid court estimated that there were 4,000 rebels in January 1569 and 25,000 by the spring of 1570, of whom some 4,000 were Turks or Berbers from North Africa who had come to support the rebellion.

On the other side, the royal army had at the beginning 2,000 foot-soldiers and 200 cavalry under the command of the Marqués de Mondéjar. The number increased substantially when Don John took charge: in the siege of Galera he had 12,000 men, while the Duke of Sessa at the same time commanded between 8,000 and 10,000 men.

From its start in the Alpujarra, the rebellion spread to the plains and to other mountainous regions on the edges of the Kingdom. A particularly dramatic conflict took place on the ridge (peñón) above Frigiliana, in the Axarquia, where entire families of Moriscos from all around had gathered: the siege lasted from June 1569 till September, when Spanish reinforcements were brought in by sea. Moriscos living in the towns—including the capital, Almería, Málaga, Guadix, Baza, and Motril—and their surrounding areas did not take part in the uprising, although they sympathised with it.

This distinct attitude of the towns can be explained by the presence of a greater number of "Old Christians" and better integration of the Moriscos in these communities. On the other hand, in the Alpujarra and other regions, where the rebellion caught on, there were villages where the only "Old Christian" was the parish priest.

== Dispersal and resettlement ==
After the suppression of the revolt, a significant portion of the Morisco population was expelled from the former Kingdom of Granada. First rounded up and held in churches, then in harsh winter conditions, with little food, they were taken on foot in groups, escorted by soldiers; many died on the way. Many went to Cordova, others to Toledo and as far as Leon. Those from the Almería region were taken in galleys to Seville. The total number expelled has been estimated at some 80,000, or roughly half of Granada's Moriscos.

The deportations meant a big fall in population, which took decades to offset; they also caused a collapse of the economy, given that the Moriscos were its main motor. Moreover, many fields lay uncultivated, orchards and workshops had been destroyed during the fighting.

The Spanish administration laid down already in 1571 the basis for repopulation. The land left free by the expulsion of the Moriscos would be shared out; settlers would be supported until their land began to bear fruit. Common land would be maintained; the acequias (irrigation channels) and reservoirs would be repaired; the springs would be for general use; pastures would be provided for the livestock; various fiscal advantages were promised. The settlers were assured of bread and flour, seed for their crops, clothing, material for cultivating their land, and oxen, horses, and mules. There were various tax concessions.

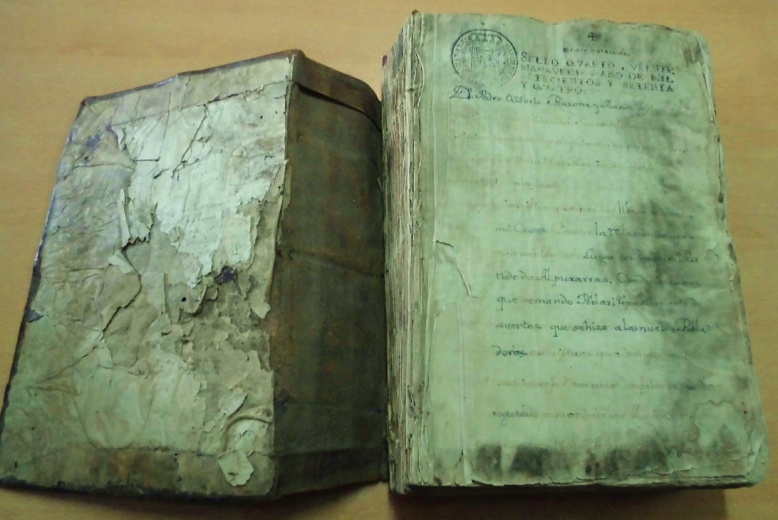
The Libro de apeos, kept in the Bubión town hall.

Typical Alpujarran village. It has expanded slightly since Moorish times, but retains its main original features: narrow streets, flat roofs, "bowler-hat" chimneys. The church is in the place of the former mosque.

The authorities in Granada sent officials in search of candidates from as far away as Galicia and Asturias and the mountain areas of Burgos and León. The process was difficult, slow, and expensive. The greater number were from western Andalucía, but they came also from Galicia, Castile, Valencia, and Murcia.

A property register (Libro de Apeos) for the villages of the Poqueira valley—typical of the Alpujarra in general—provides abundant information. (Note: The Libro de Apeos is almost illegible (see picture) and we are indebted for this information to a former mayor of Bubión, Juan Pérez Ramón. There is much more in his book Bubión en el centro de Poqueira (2012), but this was only distributed locally.) It tells us that there were 23 settlers in Bubión plus 5 in Alguastar (later merged with Bubión), 29 in Capileira, 13 in Pampaneira. Of those in Bubión, nine came from Galicia; five were already living in the village, including three widows, two members of the clergy and the first mayor (Cristóbal de Cañabate, a Morisco whose conversion had apparently been reckoned as sincere). The Libro de Apeos gave all the names, some of which are still to be found.

Land began to be distributed in September 1571: most settlers received specified quantities of irrigated land, vineyards, silkworm eggs, and fruit, nut, and chestnut trees. Grain and olive mills were to remain as public property for six years. Three grain mills in working order and four in need of repair were attributed to two inhabitants of Pampaneira. These grants were formally announced at a gathering in the plaza of Bubión on 28 June 1573, and the settlers could then start marking out and working on their lands.

Their life was not easy. Houses were in a bad state, irrigation channels (acequias) had been damaged, livestock had mostly disappeared (none are mentioned among the apeos). Those who had come from other regions had no experience of farming in the mountains; many gave up. By 1574 59 families were left in the Poqueira out of the original 70.

The resettlement programme never restored the Alpujarra population to anything like its former numbers. Before the Reconquista the Alpujarra probably had a population of about forty thousand, mainly Moors with a few "Old Christians". The war of 1568–71 and the subsequent expulsion left only a handful of converted Moors ("New Christians"): these were estimated to number just over two hundred families in the whole of the Alpujarra, just seven in the Poqueira.

The number of Christian settlers who actually stayed in the Alpujarra was approximately seven thousand. Many of these were single or came with only a small family, whereas the Moorish families had averaged five or six persons, making a population of some forty thousand before the rebellion. Gradually the settler families expanded, bringing the population to a peak of twelve thousand by the census of 1591. But then there was an outbreak of plague, infestation of locusts from Africa, and successive years of drought with much-reduced harvests. The population fell drastically and recovered slowly.

Some villages were abandoned. In the Poqueira, the tiny hamlet of Alguástar, mentioned above, was depopulated by the end of the 16th century (probably by the plague). Generally, the settlers kept the houses much as they found them and when they built they copied the same flat-roof style. Mosques were destroyed or turned into churches; towers replaced minarets.

Between 1609 and 1614, the Spanish Crown undertook the expulsion of the Moriscos from all over Spain. About half of Granada's Moriscos remained in the region after the dispersal; only 2,000 were expelled from the city of Granada, many remaining mixed with and protected by old Christians who were less hostile towards them than in other regions of Spain (notably in the Kingdom of Valencia).
