= Válor =

- town
- Flag Coat of arms

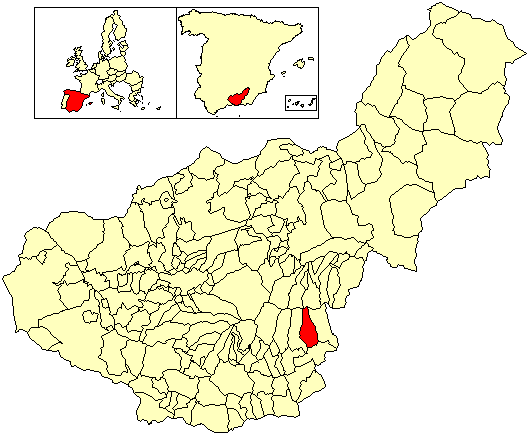
- Location of Válor
- Coordinates: 36.997206°N 3.081493°W
- Country: Spain
- Province: Granada
- Municipality: Válor

Area
  - Total: 59 km^{2} (23 sq mi)
- Elevation: 909 m (2,982 ft)

Population (2025-01-01)
  - Total: 658
  - Density: 11/km^{2} (29/sq mi)
- Time zone: UTC+1 (CET)
  - Summer (DST): UTC+2 (CEST)

Válor is a municipality located in the province of Granada, Spain. According to the 2005 census (INE), the town (pueblo) has a population of 736 inhabitants.

It is famous for its yearly Moors and Christians performance held on 15 September as part of the festival to the patron saint, the Holy Christ of the Ivy (Santo Cristo de la Yedra) an impressive statue of Christ on His Cross brought out in procession through the pueblo on 14 September. The Moors and Christians performance, which is said to re-enact the Moriscos revolt is staged on the main square next to the Church building and includes dialogues between the main protagonists leading both armies (King, general and ambassador on horseback and the spy/jester on foot), and episodes of fighting between the foot soldiers who fire blanks with their shotguns and flintlock rifles. The existing script of the play was written in the 1860s by the woman poet from Granada Enriqueta Lozano.

The traditional way of life of the local society was very vividly described by Gerald Brenan. Brenan lived through the 1920s in the village of Yegen, close to Válor. Like in other pueblos of the region, local society was divided by social and political conflicts after 1931—opposing groups of rural socialist workers to the local political bosses (caciques) and their henchmen. During the Spanish Civil War, it was briefly controlled by the rebels then taken by a column of militiamen coming from the coast. It remained in the Republican zone until the end of the war. Like in most places through the region, repression was severe after Francisco Franco's victory and most people associated with the Left were eliminated (some were executed) or forced to leave the region.

Until the 1970s, the local economy was based on the traditional Andalusian cultures (cereals, olive trees, vineyards) on small plots of land difficult to exploit because of the mountainous terrain. Traditionally most agricultural laborers were forced to do seasonal work in the plains of Andalusia at harvest time.

== See also ==
- List of municipalities in Granada
