= Aben Humeya =

Morisco leader

King of the Moriscos, Mujahideen Aben Humeya
- Fernando de Válor y Córdoba
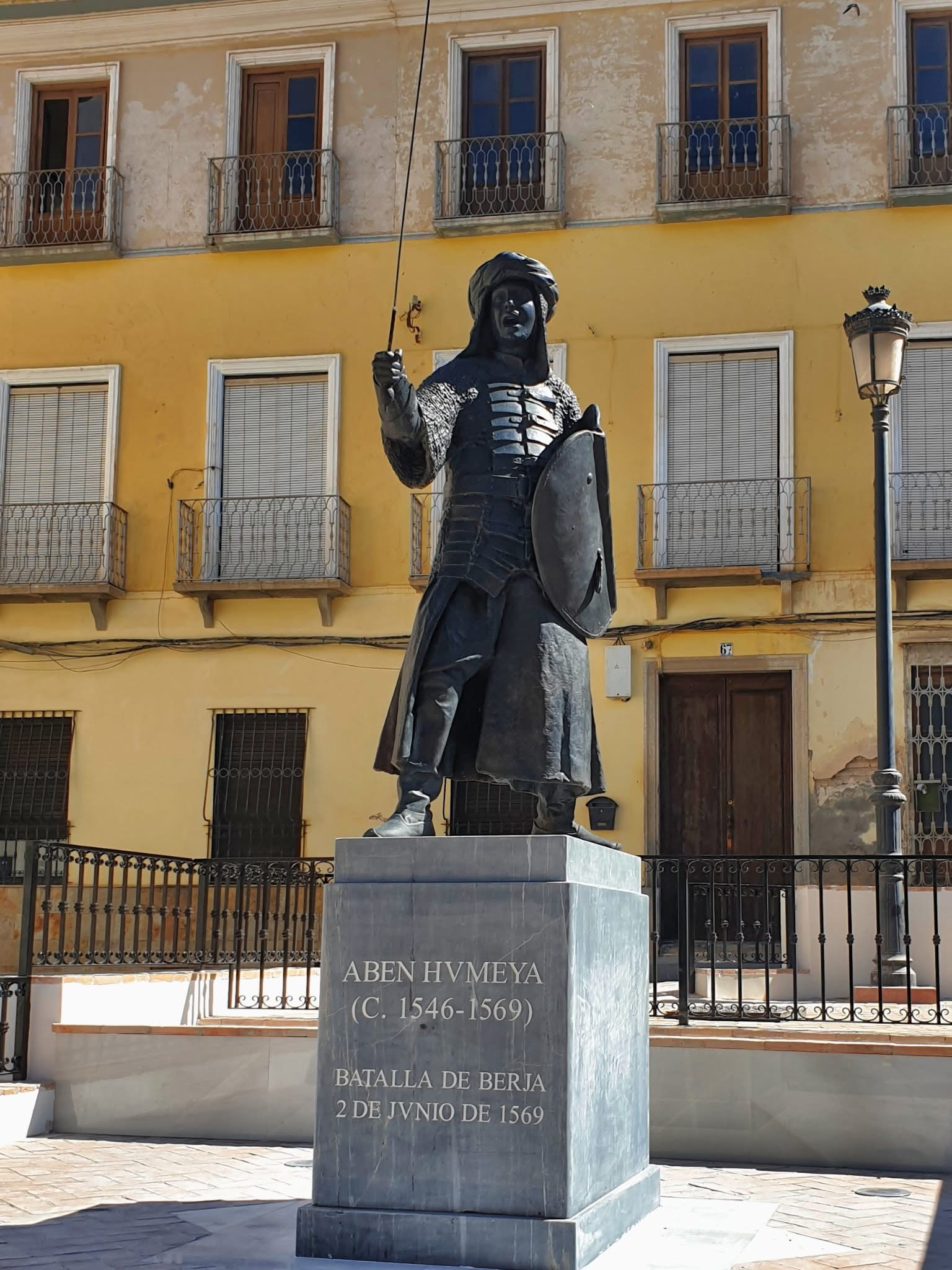
- Statue of Aben Humeya (Ibn Umayya), Berja, Spain
- Born: c. 1546; Válor, Crown of Castile (Formerly Emirate of Granada)
- Died: 20 October 1569; Crown of Castile (Alpujarras)
- Military career
- Allegiance: Emirate of Granada (Morisco rebels)
- Branch: Morisco resistance forces
- Service years: 1568–1569
- Rank: Self-proclaimed King of the Moriscos
- Commands: Morisco rebels in the Alpujarras
- Conflicts: Rebellion of the Alpujarras (1568–1571) †

Muhammad ibn Umayyah (Arabic: محمد بن أمية) better known by the hispanicized version of his name, Aben Humeya (born Fernando de Válor y Córdoba, c. 1546 – 20 October 1569), was a Morisco leader proclaimed King of the Moriscos by the insurgents in 1568, he organized guerrilla resistance in the mountainous region of the Alpujarras. He commanded the Morisco Revolt against Philip II of Spain in the Alpujarras region, within Granada.

== Biography ==
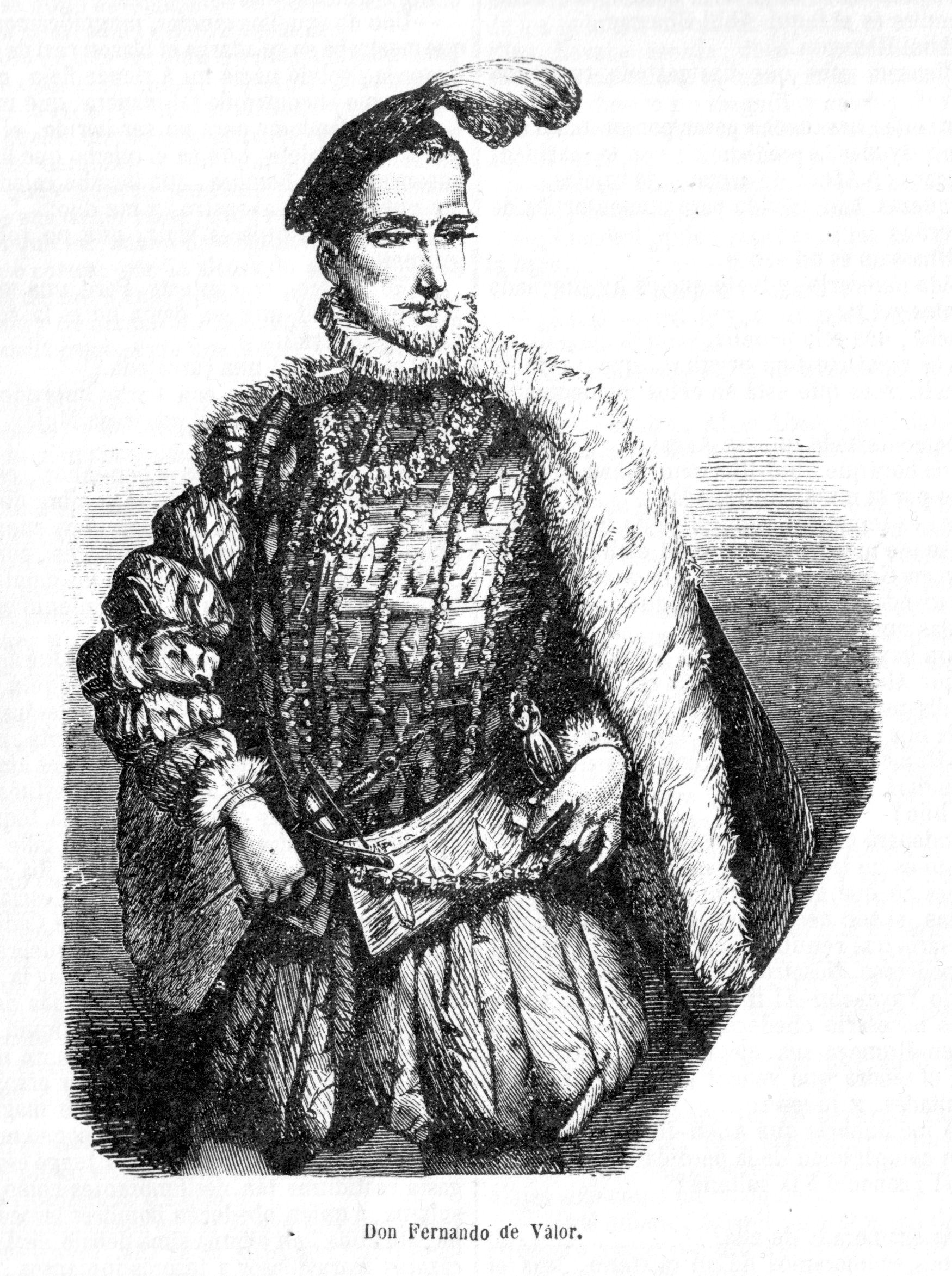
Depiction of Fernando de Válor (Aben Humeya) as Christian

The Hernandos and Valor family tree

=== Early life ===
Aben Humeya was born Fernando de Válor into a Morisco family on around 1546 in the village of Válor, located in the Alpujarras region of the former Kingdom of Granada, then part of the Crown of Castile. Aben Humeya claimed to be of noble lineage, descended from the Arab-Islamic Umayyad dynasty. The name Aben Humeya is the Hispanicized version of the Arabic name Ibn Umayya, meaning "Son of Umayya" meant to hint descent from the Umayyads.

Prior to the commencement of the Morisco revolt, Aben Humeya had been a town councilor within the region of Granada, and had been under house arrest for pulling out a dagger in the city council.

=== Rebellion of the Alpujarras ===
It is alleged that to provoke a rebellion which would give him a proper reason to expel the Moriscos of southern Spain, Philip II of Spain broke his promises previously made in treaties made with the Muslims and issued an edict requiring Moriscos to give up their Arabic names, their traditional Moorish dress, and even prohibited the speaking of Arabic. They were also told that they would have to give up their children to be educated by Christian priests. The American historian Henry Charles Lea wrote: "The Moriscos had come to the parting of the ways; there was no middle course and they had the naked alternative of submission or rebellion."

The increasing persecution of the remaining Morisco population of the former Emirate of Granada, led to the outbreak of armed rebellion. The revolt was planned by Ferag ben Ferag, descended from the royal house of Granada and Diego López Ben Aboo. They carefully ascertained the dispositions of the inhabitants of the Alpujarras, where the best stand could be made against the royal forces, solicited aid from the kings of Morocco, and persuaded the local bandits to embrace their cause.

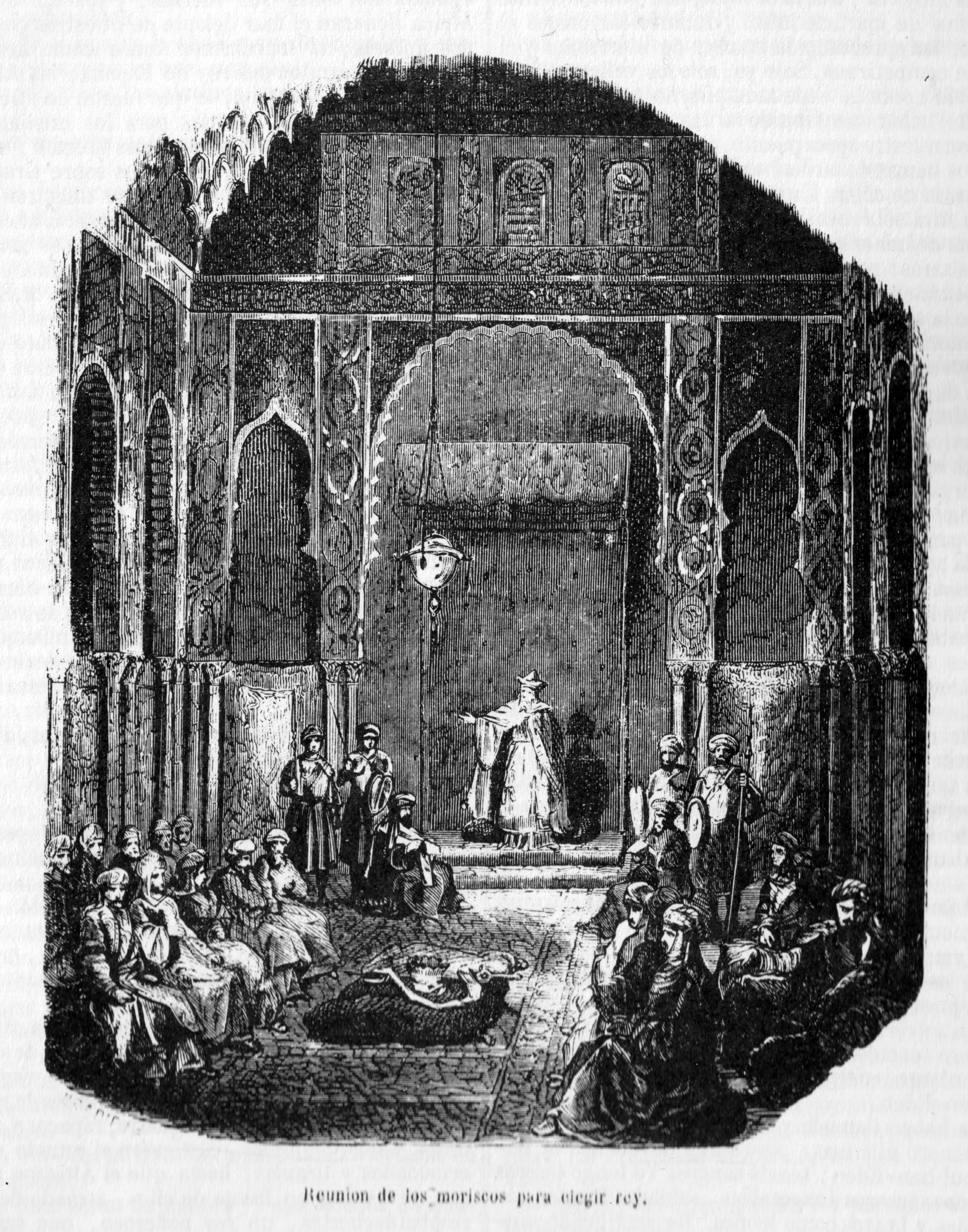
The acclamation of Aben Humeya as king of the Moriscos

On Christmas Eve of 1568, representatives of the Crypto-Muslims from Granada, specifically the Alpujarras, and from elsewhere clandestinely assembled at the Vale de Lecrin to acclaim de Valor as their king whom they renamed Aben Humeya, and apostatized. Aben Humeya also took four wives, hailing from many areas, in order to strengthen the political alliances on which he relied.

The insurrection led by Aben Humeya took the form of guerrilla warfare against the Castilian forces in the Alpujarra mountains. Initially numbering only about 4,000 men, the rebel forces quickly grew to about 25,000.

=== Downfall and murder ===
Diego Alguacil, a prominent Muslim from Ugíjar, was said to have harbored resentment against Aben Humeya for having forcibly abducted a widowed cousin and making her his mistress, when with her social status he should have taken her as his wife. Alguacil eventually married her in Tétouan six years later. In order to avenge his cousin's honor, Alguacil began plotting Humeya's downfall.

Aben Humeya had also long distrusted his Turkish and African allies, whom he removed from his camp to the frontier in Almeria and placed under the command of his cousin, Aben Aboo.

Alguacil began to play on the tensions that Humeya had reportedly had with the Turkish contingent of his army for quite some time. He went to the Turks and claimed that "he had supplied Hashish to Aben Humeya in order that it be given to the Turkish captains so that they would be sedated and later, killed that night". The Turks refused the offer, explaining that the Turkish Caliphate had sent them "not to become kings but to assist the king of the Moors." The captains suggested that the best course was, after securing approval from Algiers, to put power in the hands of a local man of noble descent in whom one might have confidence, someone who would serve the interests of the Muslims.

On 20 October 1569 Aben Humeya was strangled to death in a coup engineered by the Turkish military experts. Aben Aboo was proclaimed as Chief of the Moriscos under the name Mulley Abdalla. Aben Aboo was also eventually killed by his own men.

The deaths of Aben Humeya and Aben Aboo coupled with the arrival of 20,000 soldiers under the command of John of Austria, Philip's illegitimate half-brother, to quash the rebellion, brought an end to over two years of vicious guerilla warfare in the Alpujarras. Almost the entire population of the Alpujarras was then deported to Castille or Kingdom of Seville and some 270 villages and hamlets were repopulated with settlers brought in from Northern Spain. The remaining villages were abandoned. This led to the destruction of the silk industry over the course of several centuries.

King Philip II had ordered the dispersal of 80,000 Moriscos of the Kingdom of Granada to other parts of Castile, expecting that this would fragment the Morisco community and accelerate their assimilation into the Christian population, although actually also had some influence on the local Moriscos who had until then become more assimilated. This eventually culminated with the overall Expulsion of the Moriscos.

== See also ==
- Morisco
- Rebellion of the Alpujarras (1568–1571)
- Granada
