= List of mountains in Spain =

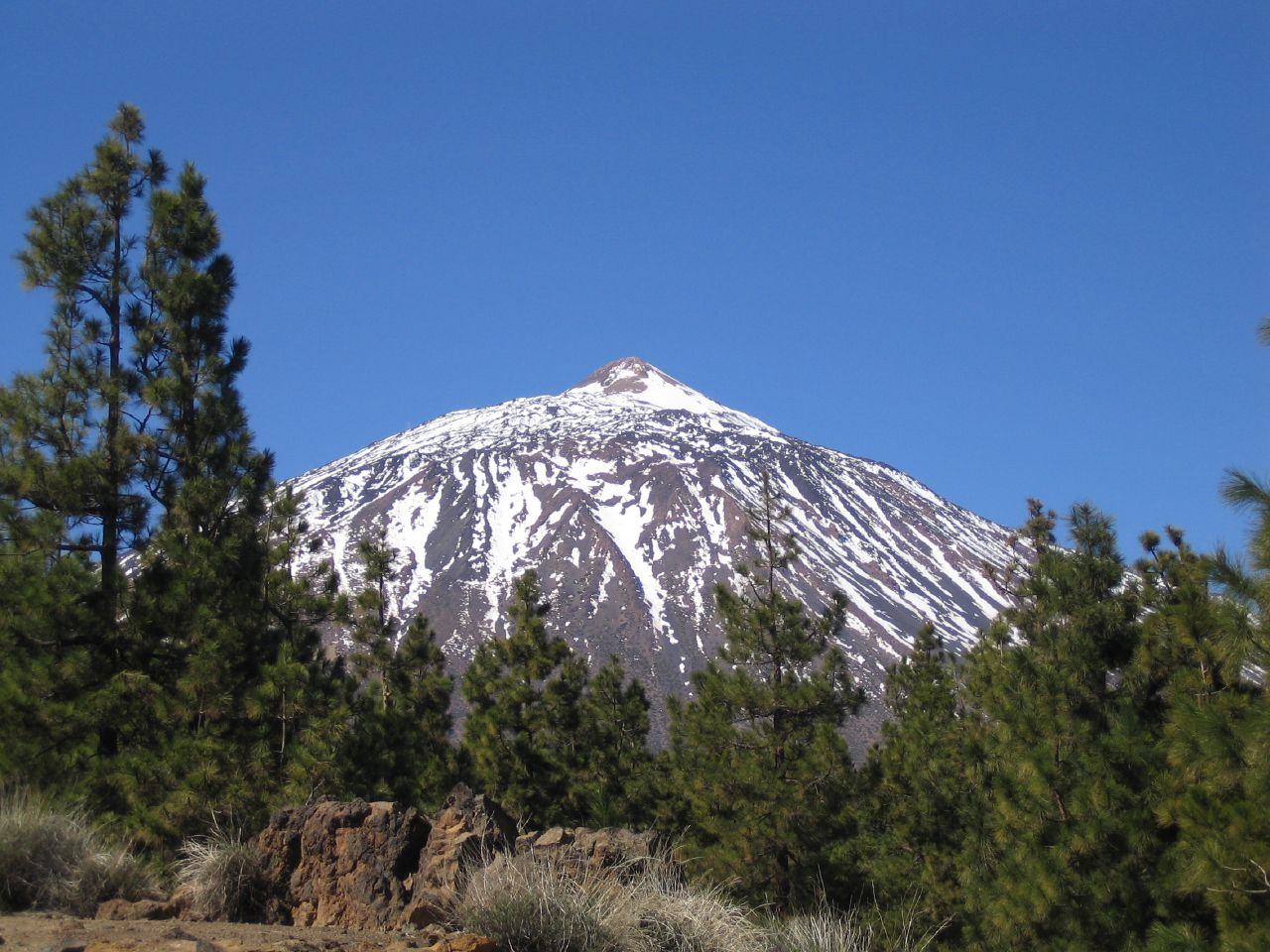
Teide, at 3715 m is the highest peak of Spain.

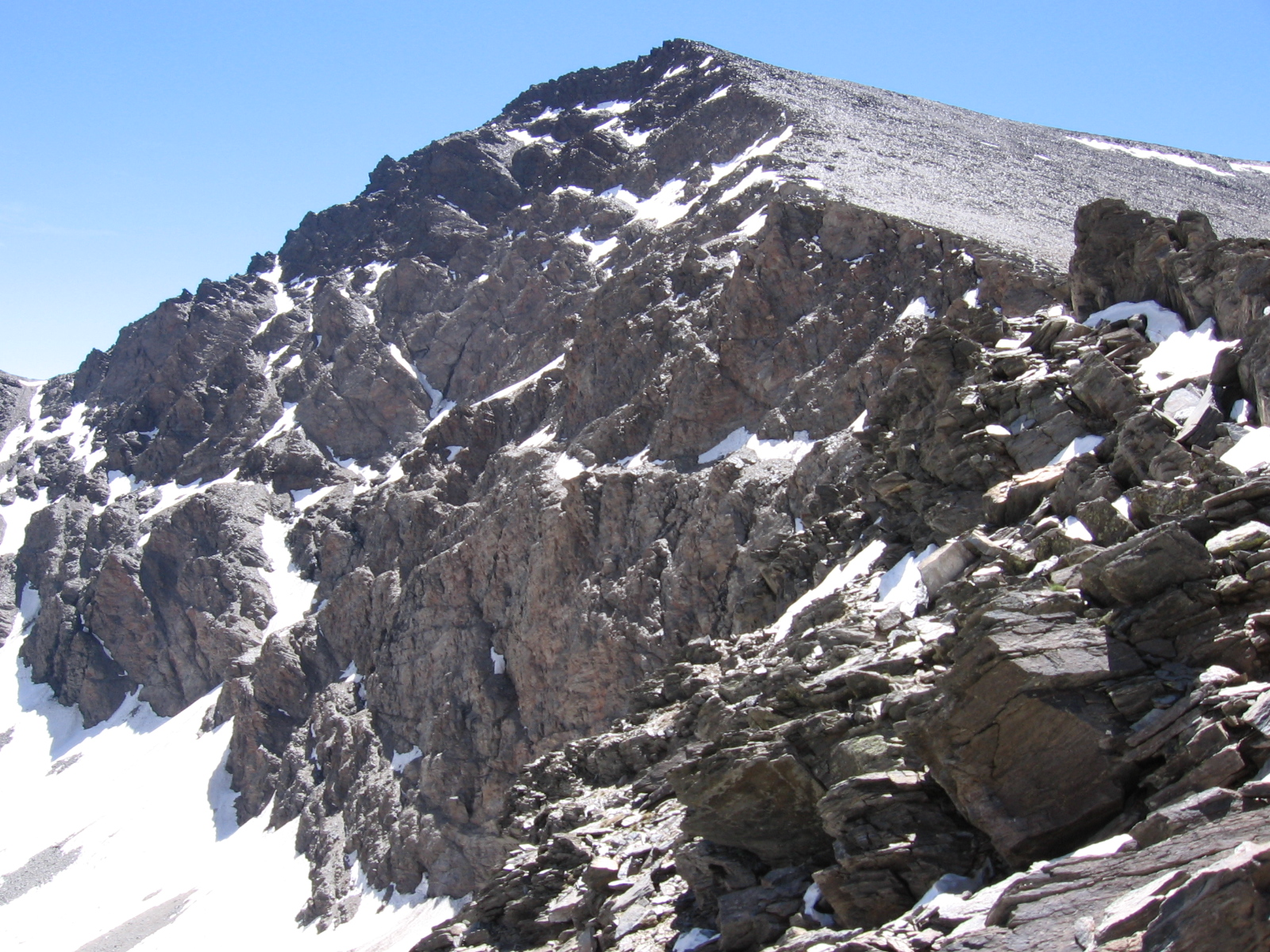
Mulhacén, at 3478,6 m is the highest mountain of the Iberian Peninsula.

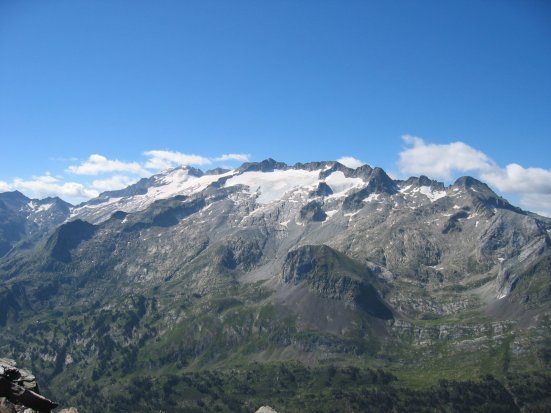
Pico Aneto, 3404 m, the highest of Pyrenees

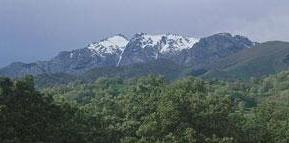
Pico Almanzor, at 2592 m is the highest of Sistema Central.

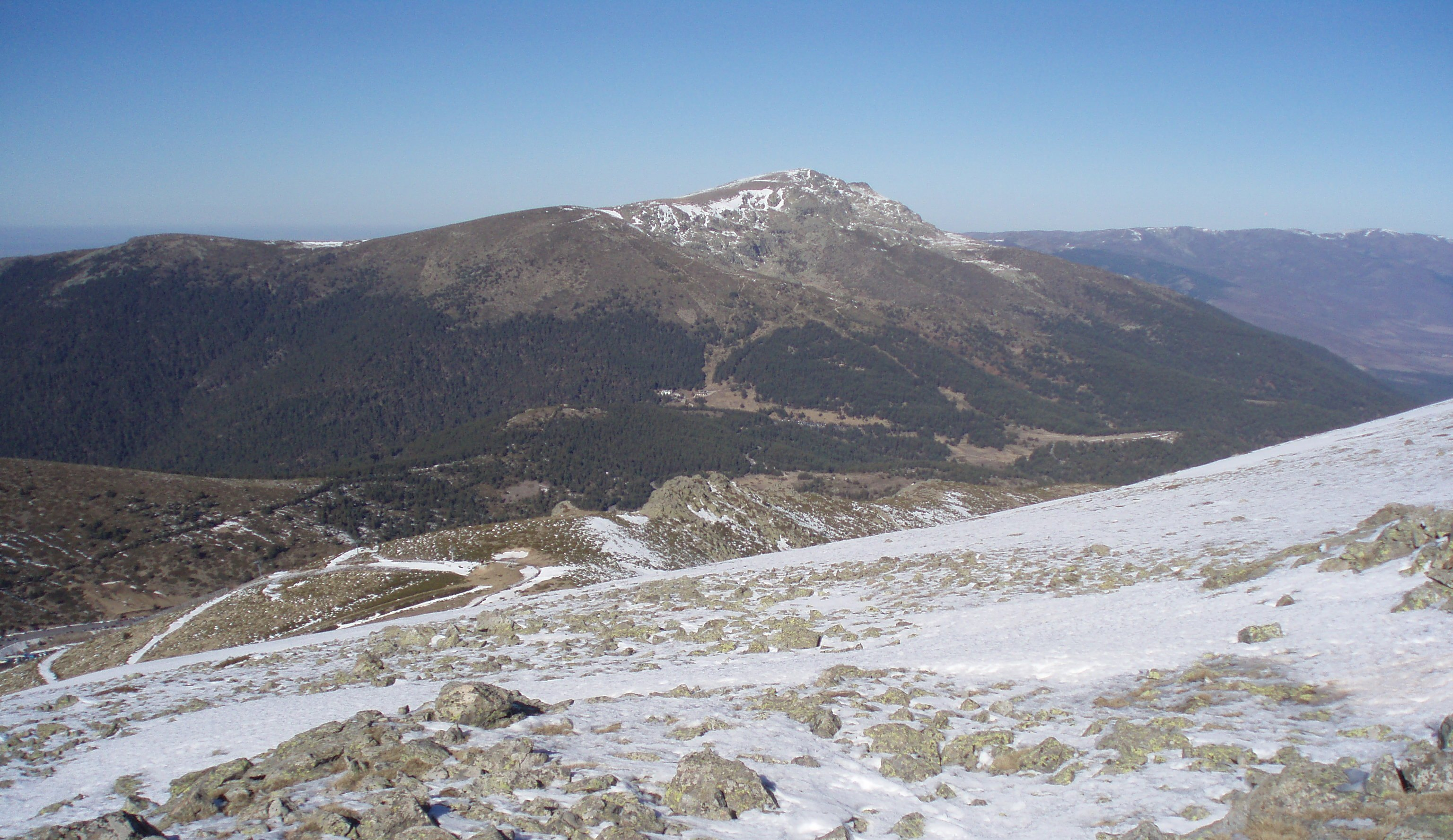
Pico de Peñalara, 2428 m, the highest of Sierra de Guadarrama

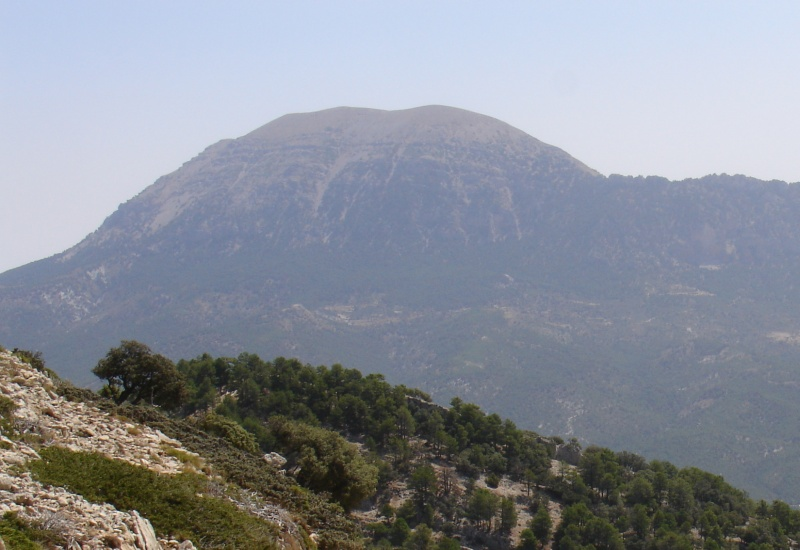
La Sagra, at 2383 m is the highest mountain of the Prebaetic System.

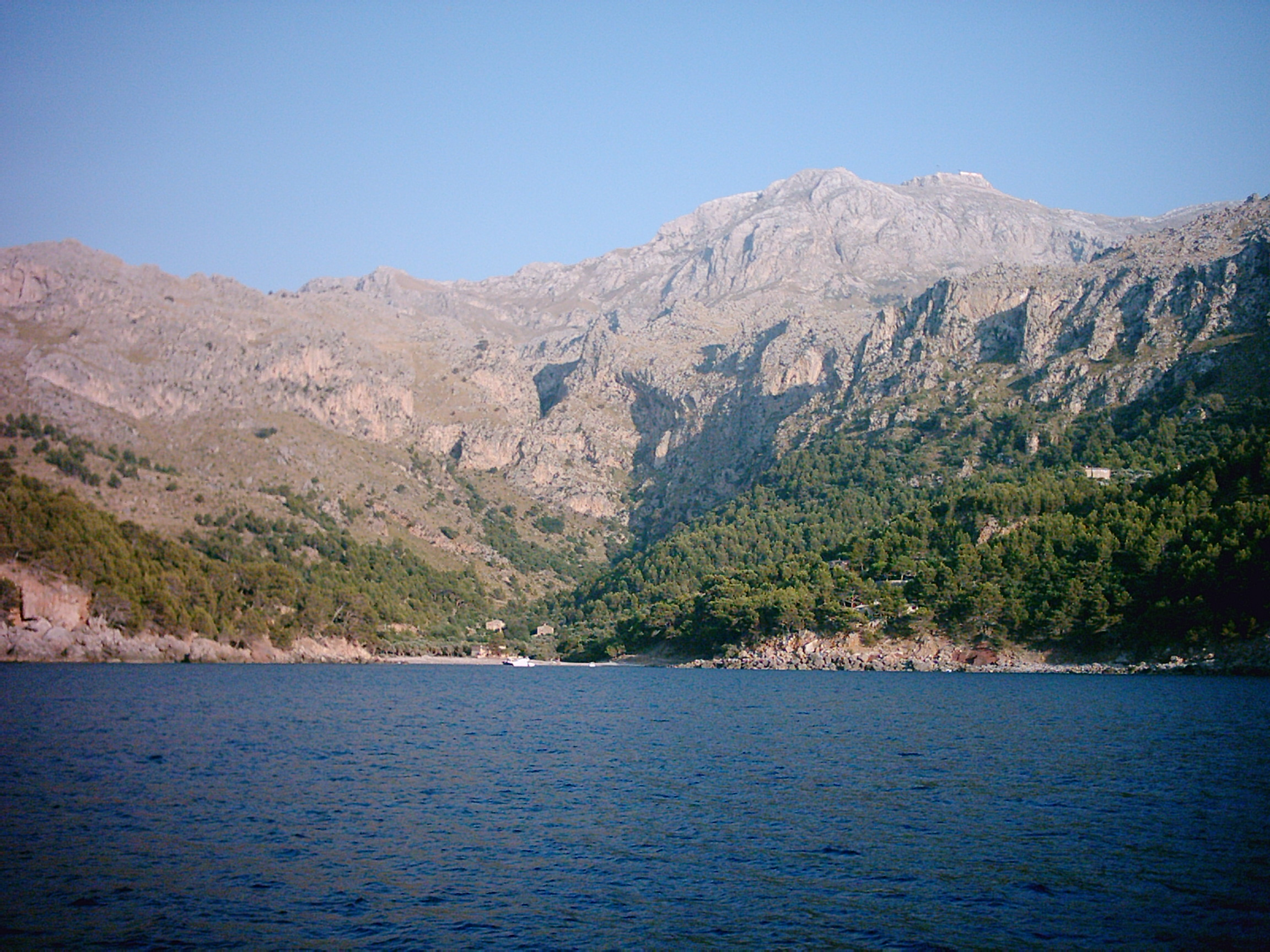
Puig Major, 1445 m, the highest of Balearic Islands

This is a list of Spanish mountains (with associated ranges) with their elevation taken from the Instituto Nacional de Estadística de España data. Where available is also reported the mountains' prominence.

List of mountains in Spain
Name	Range	Altitude		Prominence		Province
Name	Range	m	ft	m	ft	Province
Teide	Canary Islands (Tenerife)	3,715	12,188	3,715	12,188	Santa Cruz de Tenerife
Mulhacén	Cordillera Penibética (Sierra Nevada)	3,479	11,414	3,285	10,778	Granada
Pico Aneto	Pyrenees (Macizo de la Maladeta)	3,404	11,168	2,812	9,226	Huesca
Veleta	Cordillera Penibética (Sierra Nevada)	3,398	11,148	315	1,033	Granada
Posets o Llardana	Pyrenees (Macizo de Posets)	3,375	11,073	1,142	3,747	Huesca
Alcazaba	Cordillera Penibética (Sierra Nevada)	3,371	11,060	176	577	Granada
Monte Perdido	Pyrenees (Macizo del Monte Perdido)	3,355	11,007	999	3,278	Huesca
Pico Maldito	Pyrenees (Macizo de la Maladeta)	3,350	10,990	20	66	Huesca
Pico Espadas	Pyrenees (Macizo de Posets)	3,332	10,932	107	351	Huesca
Cilindro de Marboré	Pyrenees (Macizo del Monte Perdido)	3,328	10,919	251	823	Huesca
Cerro de los Machos	Cordillera Penibética, Sierra Nevada	3,327	10,915			Granada
Pico del Salón	Cordillera Penibética, Sierra Nevada	3,325	10,909			Granada
Pico del Campanario	Cordillera Penibética, Sierra Nevada	3,318	10,886			Granada
Pico Maladeta	Pyrenees (Macizo de la Maladeta)	3,308	10,853	210	690	Huesca
Pico del Zacatín	Cordillera Penibética, Sierra Nevada	3,307	10,850			Granada
Vignemale	Pyrenees (Macizo de Viñamala)	3,298	10,820	1,029	3,376	Huesca
Pico Tempestades	Pyrenees (Macizo de la Maladeta)	3,290	10,790	88	289	Huesca
Soum de Ramond o Pico Añisclo	Pyrenees (Macizo del Monte Perdido)	3,290	10,790	88	289	Huesca
Pico Marboré	Pyrenees (Macizo del Monte Perdido)	3,259	10,692			Huesca
Puntal de la Caldera (es)	Cordillera Penibética Sierra Nevada	3,226	10,584			Granada
Pico Perdiguero	Pyrenees	3,221	10,568	638	2,093	Huesca
Pico Russell	Pyrenees (Macizo de la Maladeta)	3,205	10,515			Huesca
Loma Pelada (es)	Cordillera Penibética, Sierra Nevada	3,185	10,449			Granada
Horcajo de Trevélez	Cordillera Penibética Sierra Nevada	3,182	10,440			Granada
Pico del Cuervo	Cordillera Penibética Sierra Nevada	3,152	10,341			Granada
Puntal de Vacares	Cordillera Penibética, Sierra Nevada	3,149	10,331			Granada
Balaitus	Pyrenees (Macizo de Balaitus)	3,146	10,322	850	2,790	Huesca
Pica d'Estats	Pyrenees (Macizo de la Pica d'Estats)	3,143	10,312	1,281	4,203	Lleida
Pico Viejo	Canary Islands (Tenerife)	3,135	10,285			Santa Cruz de Tenerife
La Munia	Pyrenees	3,134	10,282	683	2,241	Huesca
Pic Verdaguer	Pyrenees (Montcalm Massif)	3,129	10,266			Lleida
Punta Gabarró	Pyrenees (Montcalm Massif)	3,105	10,187			Lleida
Picón de Jeres	Cordillera Penibética, Sierra Nevada	3,086	10,125			Granada
Puntal del Goterón	Cordillera Penibética Sierra Nevada	3,075	10,089			Granada
Astazu	Pyrenees (Monte Perdido)	3,071	10,075			Huesca
Argualas	Pyrenees (Macizo de Panticosa)	3,046	9,993	71	233	Huesca
Aragüells	Pyrenees (Macizo de la Maladeta)	3,037	9,964			Huesca
Comaloforno	Pyrenees (Besiberri Massif)	3,029	9,938	50	160	Lleida
Pico del Caballo	Cordillera Penibética, Sierra Nevada	3,011	9,879			Granada
Robiñera	Pyrenees	3,003	9,852	181	594	Huesca
Cotiella	Pyrenees	2,912	9,554	1,182	3,878	Huesca
Puigmal	Pyrenees	2,910	9,550	1,331	4,367	Girona
Peña Collarada	Pyrenees	2,883	9,459	803	2,635	Huesca
Montaña Blanca	Canary Islands (Tenerife)	2,750	9,020			Santa Cruz de Tenerife
Alto de Guajara	Canary Islands (Tenerife)	2,718	8,917			Santa Cruz de Tenerife
Torre Cerredo	Cordillera Cantábrica (Picos de Europa)	2,650	8,690	1,931	6,335	Asturias and León
Vulturó	Serra del Cadí (Pre-Pyrenees)	2,648	8,688	871	2,858	Lleida
Aspe	Pyrenees	2,645	8,678	501	1,644	Huesca
Torre del Llambrión	Cordillera Cantábrica (Picos de Europa)	2,642	8,668	302	991	León
Torre del Tiro Tirso	Cordillera Cantábrica (Picos de Europa)	2,641	8,665			León
Torre sin Nombre	Cordillera Cantábrica (Picos de Europa)	2,638	8,655			Asturias
Torre Blanca	Cordillera Cantábrica (Picos de Europa)	2,619	8,593	30	98	Cantabria and León
Peña Vieja	Cordillera Cantábrica (Picos de Europa)	2,617	8,586	277	909	Cantabria
Torre de la Palanca	Cordillera Cantábrica (Picos de Europa)	2,614	8,576			León
Chullo	Cordillera Penibética (Sierra Nevada)	2,611	8,566	566	1,857	Granada and Almería
Costa Cabirolera	Catalan Prepyrinees (Serra del Cadí)	2,605	8,547			Barcelona
Torre Santa	Cordillera Cantábrica (Picos de Europa)	2,598	8,524	1,135	3,724	León
Almanzor	Sistema Central (Sierra de Gredos)	2,592	8,504	1,690	5,540	Ávila
Roque de la Grieta (es)	Canary Islands (Tenerife)	2,576	8,451			Santa Cruz de Tenerife
Torre del Cadí	Pyrenees (Serra del Cadí)	2,567	8,422	79	259	Lleida
Pico La Galana	Sistema Central (Sierra de Gredos)	2,568	8,425	85	279	Ávila
Peña Prieta	Fuentes Carrionas (Cordillera Cantábrica)	2,538	8,327	929	3,048	Palencia and Cantabria
Montaña de Pasajirón	Canary Islands (Tenerife)	2,527	8,291			Santa Cruz de Tenerife
Curavacas	Fuentes Carrionas (Cordillera Cantábrica)	2,520	8,270	472	1,549	Palencia
Picu Urriellu o Naranjo de Bulnes	Cordillera Cantábrica (Picos de Europa)	2,519	8,264	205	673	Asturias
Montaña Rajada	Canary Islands (Tenerife)	2,509	8,232			Santa Cruz de Tenerife
Pedraforca	Pyrinees (Serra del Cadí)	2,497	8,192	631	2,070	Barcelona
Turbón	Pyrenees (Ribagorza)	2,492	8,176	1,447	4,747	Huesca
Espigüete	Fuentes Carrionas (Cordillera Cantábrica)	2,450	8,040			Palencia and León
Peñalara	Sistema Central (Sierra de Guadarrama)	2,428	7,966	1,113	3,652	Madrid and Segovia
Canchal de la Ceja	Sistema Central (Sierra de Béjar)	2,428	7,966			Salamanca
Mesa de los Tres Reyes	Pyrenees	2,428	7,966	392	1,286	Navarra
Roque de los Muchachos	Canary Islands (La Palma)	2,426	7,959	2,426	7,959	Santa Cruz de Tenerife
Cabeza Nevada	Sistema Central (Sierra de Gredos)	2,426	7,959	97	318	Ávila
Calvitero	Sistema Central (Sierra de Béjar)	2,425	7,956	76	249	Salamanca
Peña Ubiña	Cordillera Cantábrica (Macizo de Ubiña)	2,417	7,930			León and Asturias
Picos del Fontán	Cordillera Cantábrica (Macizo de Ubiña)	2,414	7,920			Asturias
Sombrero de Chasna	Canary Islands (Tenerife)	2,411	7,910			Santa Cruz de Tenerife
Abreu	Canary Islands (Tenerife)	2,402	7,881			Tenerife
La Covacha	Sistema Central (Sierra de Gredos)	2,399	7,871	387	1,270	Ávila
Torre Bermeja	Cordillera Cantábrica (Picos de Europa)	2,393	7,851			León
Izaña	Canary Islands (Tenerife)	2,386	7,828			Santa Cruz de Tenerife
La Sagra	Prebaetic System	2,383	7,818	1,408	4,619	Granada
Cabezas de Hierro	Sistema Central (Sierra de Guadarrama)	2,381	7,812	551	1,808	Madrid
Pico de las Cabras	Canary Islands (Tenerife)	2,363	7,753			Santa Cruz de Tenerife
La Mira	Sistema Central (Sierra de Gredos)	2,343	7,687	348	1,142	Ávila
Montaña del Cerrillar	Canary Islands (Tenerife)	2,342	7,684			Santa Cruz de Tenerife
Pico Murcia	Fuentes Carrionas (Cordillera Cantábrica)	2,341	7,680			León and Palencia
Mesa del Obispo	Canary Islands (Tenerife)	2,337	7,667			Santa Cruz de Tenerife
Moncayo	Sistema Ibérico	2,313	7,589	1,298	4,259	Soria and Zaragoza
Colmenas	Canary Islands (Tenerife)	2,308	7,572			Tenerife
Serrota	Sistema Central (La Serrota)	2,294	7,526	722	2,369	Ávila
Pico del Lobo	Sistema Central (Sierra de Ayllón)	2,273	7,457	826	2,710	Guadalajara and Segovia
Calar de Santa Bárbara	Cordillera Penibética (Sierra de Baza)	2,269	7,444			Granada
Montaña de Igueque	Canary Islands (Tenerife)	2,267	7,438			Santa Cruz de Tenerife
Montaña del Cedro	Canary Islands (Tenerife)	2,265	7,431			Santa Cruz de Tenerife
San Lorenzo	Sistema Ibérico (Sierra de la Demanda)	2,262	7,421	1,118	3,668	La Rioja
Montaña de los Corrales	Canary Islands (Tenerife)	2,257	7,405			Santa Cruz de Tenerife
Morrón de la Lagunilla	Cordillera Penibética (Sierra de Gádor)	2,249	7,379	1,303	4,275	Almería
Morrón de Visorio	Cordillera Penibética (Sierra de Gádor)	2,246	7,369			Almería
Roques de García	Canary Islands (Tenerife)	2,245	7,365			Santa Cruz de Tenerife
Montaña de la Negrita	Canary Islands (Tenerife)	2,241	7,352			Santa Cruz de Tenerife
Coriscao	Cordillera Cantábrica	2,234	7,329			Cantabria and León
Montaña Reventada	Canary Islands (Tenerife)	2,230	7,320			Santa Cruz de Tenerife
Urbión	Sistema Ibérico (Sierra de Urbión)	2,228	7,310	987	3,238	Soria
La Maliciosa	Sistema Central (Sierra de Guadarrama)	2,227	7,306	153	502	Madrid
Caramujo	Canary Islands (Tenerife)	2,225	7,300			Santa Cruz de Tenerife
Montaña de los Tomillos	Canary Islands (Tenerife)	2,222	7,290			Santa Cruz de Tenerife
Cuchillón - El Pando	Cordillera Cantábrica (Sierra de Híjar)	2,222–2,178	7,290–7,146	120	390	Cantabria
El Nevero	Sistema Central (Sierra de Guadarrama)	2,209	7,247	281	922	Madrid and Segovia
La Pinareja	Sistema Central (Sierra de Guadarrama)	2,197	7,208	401	1,316	Segovia
Peña Orniz	Cordillera Cantábrica	2,194	7,198			León and Asturias
Peña Ubiña Pequeña	Cordillera Cantábrica	2,193	7,195			León
Montaña del Roque	Canary Islands (Tenerife)	2,192	7,192			Santa Cruz de Tenerife
Cerro del Cabezo	Sistema Central (Sierra de Gredos)	2,190	7,190			Ávila
Teleno	Montes de León	2,188	7,178			León
Montigüero	Cordillera Cantábrica	2,188	7,178			León
Monte Brañacaballo	Cordillera Cantábrica	2,182	7,159			León and Asturias
Risco de la Fortaleza	Canary Islands (Tenerife)	2,172	7,126			Santa Cruz de Tenerife
Calar Alto	Cordillera Penibética (Sierra de los Filabres)	2,168	7,113			Almería
Mágina	Cordillera Subbética (Sierra Mágina)	2,164	7,100			Jaén
Peña Polinosa	Cordillera Cantábrica	2,160	7,090			León
Pico Zapatero	Sistema Central (Sierra de la Paramera)	2,160	7,090	652	2,139	Ávila
Pico Huevo de Faro	Cordillera Cantábrica	2,155	7,070			León
Pico Morronegro	Cordillera Cantábrica	2,152	7,060			León
Peñón de Polarda	Cordillera Penibética (Sierra Nevada)	2,150	7,050			Almería
Montaña Las Lajas	Canary Islands (Tenerife)	2,148	7,047			Santa Cruz de Tenerife
Cebollera	Sistema Ibérico	2,147	7,044	114	374	La Rioja and Soria
Siete Picos	Sistema Central (Sierra de Guadarrama)	2,136	7,008	278	912	Madrid and Segovia
Cabeza de la Yegua	Montes de León(Sierra del Teleno)	2,135	7,005			León
San Millán	Sistema Ibérico (Sierra de la Demanda)	2,132	6,995			Burgos
Peña Cebollera	Sistema Central (Sierra de Ayllón)	2,128	6,982			Guadalajara, Madrid and Segovia
Peña Trevinca	Macizo Galaico-Leonés Montes de León (Sierra de la Cabrera)	2,127	6,978	881	2,890	León, Orense and Zamora
Cornón	Cordillera Cantábrica (Sierra del Cordel)	2,125	6,972			Cantabria
Vizcodillo	Montes de León (Sierra de la Cabrera)	2,121	6,959			León and Zamora
La Najarra	Sistema Central (Sierra de Guadarrama)	2,122	6,962	132	433	Madrid
Catoute	Cordillera Cantábrica	2,117	6,946			León
Alto de Peña Negra	Montes de León (Sierra de la Cabrera)	2,116	6,942			León and Zamora
Peñas de Faro	Cordillera Cantábrica	2,112	6,929			León
Las Empanadas	Prebaetic System (Sierras de Cazorla and Segura)	2,106	6,909	394	1,293	Granada and Jaén
Tambarón	Cordillera Cantábrica (Sierra de Gistredo)	2,102	6,896			León
Reajo Alto	Sistema Central (Sierra de Guadarrama)	2,102	6,896	324	1,063	Madrid and Segovia
Montaña Mostaza	Canary Islands (Tenerife)	2,100	6,900			Santa Cruz de Tenerife
Las Cabras	Cordillera Subbética (Sierra de Alcaraz)	2,084	6,837			Albacete
Tetica de Bacares	Cordillera Penibética (Sierra de Baza and Filabres)	2,083	6,834			Almería
Nevadín	Cordillera Cantábrica	2,082	6,831			León
Ayosa	Canary Islands (Tenerife)	2,078	6,818			Santa Cruz de Tenerife
La Maroma	Cordillera Penibética (Sierra de Tejeda)	2,068	6,785			Málaga
Pico de Guara	Pyrenees (Sierra de Guara)	2,066	6,778			Huesca
Montaña de la Crucita	Canary Islands (Tenerife)	2,057	6,749			Santa Cruz de Tenerife
Pico Ocejón	Sistema Central (Sierra del Ocejón)	2,049	6,722	540	1,770	Guadalajara
Cerro Poyo	Cordillera Subbética	2,045	6,709			Almería
El Taga	Pyrenees (Sierra de Conivella)	2,035	6,677			Girona
Peñarroya	Sistema Ibérico (Sierra de Gúdar)	2,028	6,654	1,013	3,323	Teruel
Peña Requejines	Cordillera Cantábrica	2,026	6,647			León
Cabañas	Prebaetic System (Sierra del Pozo)	2,026	6,647			Jaén
Picu el Chagunón	Cordillera Cantábrica	2,025	6,644			León
Pico Cho Marcial	Canary Islands (Tenerife)	2,023	6,637			Santa Cruz de Tenerife
Torozo	Sistema Central (Sierra de Gredos)	2,022	6,634			Ávila
Peña la Rapaína	Cordillera Cantábrica	2,020	6,630			León and Asturias
Javalambre	Sistema Ibérico (Sierra de Javalambre)	2,020	6,630	796	2,612	Teruel
Los Obispos	Prebaetic System (Macizo de Revolcadores)	2,015	6,611			Murcia
Pinajarro	Sistema Central (Sierra de Gredos)	2,012	6,601			Cáceres
Pico Pandián	Cordillera Cantábrica, (Montaña de Riaño), Sierra de Hormas	2,009	6,591	484	1,588	León
Peña Vendimia	Cordillera Cantábrica	2,009	6,591			León
Pico Polvoreda o Pico Correcillas	Cordillera Cantábrica	2,007	6,585			León
Peña del Viento	Cordillera Cantábrica	2,000	6,600			León and Asturias
Revolcadores	Prebaetic System (Macizo de Revolcadores)	1,999	6,558			Murcia
Las Banderillas	Prebaetic System (Sierra de Segura)	1,993	6,539			Jaén
Peña Las Pintas	Cordillera Cantábrica (Montaña de Riaño)	1,985	6,512	668	2,192	León
Montaña Joco	Canary Islands (Tenerife)	1,965	6,447			Santa Cruz de Tenerife
Pico Yordas	Cordillera Cantábrica, (Montaña de Riaño)	1,967	6,453	591	1,939	León
Pico Sáncenas	Cordillera Cantábrica	1,962	6,437			León
Morro de la Agujereada	Canary Islands (Gran Canaria)	1,949	6,394	1,949	6,394	Las Palmas
Montaña Samara	Canary Islands (Tenerife)	1,939	6,362			Santa Cruz de Tenerife
Pico Caimodorro	Sistema Ibérico (Montes Universales)	1,935	6,348			Teruel
Pico Mustallar	Cordillera Cantábrica	1,935	6,348			León
Mencilla	Sistema Ibérico (Sierra de Mencilla)	1,932	6,339			Burgos
Peña Valdorria	Cordillera Cantábrica	1,924	6,312			León
Roque Redondo	Canary Islands (Gran Canaria)	1,920	6,300			Las Palmas
Torrecilla	Cordillera Penibética (Sierra de las Nieves)	1,919	6,296	1,472	4,829	Málaga
Cueva Valiente	Sistema Central (Sierra de Guadarrama)	1,903	6,243	392	1,286	Segovia
Peña Filera	Cordillera Cantábrica	1,873	6,145			León
Peña la Viesca	Cordillera Cantábrica	1,867	6,125			León
Alto Rey	Sistema Central (Sierra de Alto Rey)	1,848	6,063	480	1,570	Guadalajara
Cerro Calderón o Alto de las Barracas	Sistema Iberico (Sierra de Javalambre)	1,838	6,030			Valencia
Mondalindo	Sistema Central (Sierra de Guadarrama)	1,833	6,014	351	1,152	Madrid
Navachica	Penibaetic System (Sierra de Almijara)	1,831	6,007	597	1,959	Málaga
Roque Nublo	Canary Islands (Gran Canaria)	1,813	5,948			Las Palmas
Peñagolosa	Sistema Ibérico (Macizo de Peñagolosa)	1,813	5,948			Castellón
El Yelmo	Cordillera Subbética (Sierra de Segura)	1,809	5,935			Jaén
Cabeza de Manzaneda	Macizo Galaico (Sierra de Queixa)	1,781	5,843			Orense
Alto Cabrera	Sistema Ibérico (Sierra de Javalambre)	1,761	5,778			Valencia
Montaña Chirigel	Canary Islands (Tenerife)	1,745	5,725			Santa Cruz de Tenerife
Cerro de Gorría	Sistema Central (Sierra de Ávila)	1,723	5,653	326	1,070	Ávila
Peña de Francia	Cordillera Central (Sierra de Francia)	1,723	5,653			Salamanca
Castro Valnera	Cordillera Cantábrica (Sierra de Valnera)	1,718	5,636	866	2,841	Burgos and Cantabria
Pico Padrón	Sierra de Alcaraz	1,711	5,614			Albacete
Turó de l'Home	Serralada Prelitoral (Montseny)	1,706	5,597	1,121	3,678	Barcelona
Seixo	Macizo Galaico (Sierra de Queixa)	1,706	5,597			Orense
Matagalls	Catalan Pre-Coastal Range	1,694	5,558			Barcelona
Pico Gilbo	Cordillera Cantábrica, (Montaña de Riaño)	1,679	5,509	488	1,601	León
Torreón	Cordillera Penibética (Sierra de Grazalema)	1,654	5,427			Cádiz
Alto de la Hambrienta	Sistema Ibérico (Sierra de Gúdar)	1,632	5,354			Castellón
San Mamede	Macizo Galaico	1,618	5,308	294	965	Orense
Agrillar	Sistema Ibérico (Sierra del Toro)	1,616	5,302			Castellón
Pía Pájaro	Macizo Galaico (Sierra del Caurel)	1,601	5,253			Lugo
Pusilibro	Pyrenees (Sierra de Loarre)	1,597	5,240			Huesca
Las Villuercas	Montes de Toledo	1,595	5,233	956	3,136	Cáceres
Salada	Sistema Ibérico (Sierra del Toro)	1,586	5,203	119	390	Castellón
Espuña	Cordillera Bética (Sierra Espuña)	1,583	5,194	843	2,766	Murcia
El Cerrajón de Murtas	Cordillera Penibética (Sierra de la Contraviesa)	1,577	5,174			Granada
La Tiñosa	Cordillera Subbéticas (La Tiñosa)	1,570	5,150			Priego de Córdoba
Chinyero	Canary Islands (Tenerife)	1,560	5,120			Santa Cruz de Tenerife
Aitana	Prebaetic System (Sierra de Aitana)	1,558	5,112			Alicante
Cruz de los Tres Reinos	Sistema Ibérico (Sierra de Albarracín)	1,555	5,102			Valencia, Teruel and Cuenca
Aitxuri	Basque Mountains	1,551	5,089	943	3,094	Guipúzcoa
Aizkorri	Basque Mountains	1,528	5,013			Province of Guipúzcoa
Gratal	Pyrenees (Sierra de Gratal)	1,542	5,059			Huesca
Cabeza Gorda	Sistema Central (Serranía de Vallejera)	1,523	4,997			Salamanca
Malpaso	Canary Islands (El Hierro)	1,500	4,900	1,500	4,900	Santa Cruz de Tenerife
Jálama	Sistema Central (Sierra de Gata)	1,492	4,895	601	1,972	Cáceres and Salamanca
Garajonay	Canary Islands (La Gomera)	1,487	4,879	1,487	4,879	Santa Cruz de Tenerife
Monte Gorbea	Basque Mountains	1,482	4,862			Álava and Vizcaya
Los Reales	Sierra Bermeja	1,449	4,754			Málaga
Rocigalgo	Montes de Toledo	1,448	4,751			Toledo
Mont Caro	Ports de Tortosa-Beseit	1,447	4,747			Province of Tarragona
Pico Jano	Cantabrian Mountains	1,446	4,744	350	1,150	Province of Santander
Puig Major	Serra de Tramuntana (Mallorca)	1,445	4,741	1,445	4,741	Balearic Islands
Pico Humión	Montes Obarenes	1,435	4,708	715	2,346	Burgos
Pico Ranera	Sierra de Mira	1,430	4,690			Cuenca
Corral de Cantos	Montes de Toledo	1,419	4,656			Toledo
Puig Campana	Prebaetic System	1,410	4,630	517	1,696	Alicante
Montcabrer	Prebaetic System (Sierra de Mariola)	1,389	4,557			Alicante
Pico Colativí	Cordillera Penibética (Sierra Alhamilla)	1,387	4,551			Almería
Plà de la Casa	Prebaetic System (La Serrella)	1,379	4,524			Alicante
Pico de Cruces	Sistema Central (Sierra de San Vicente (Sistema Central))	1,373	4,505	592	1,942	Toledo
Pico de la Madama	Prebaetic System (Sierra del Carche)	1,372	4,501			Murcia
Menejador	Prebaetic System (Carrascal de la Font Roja)	1,352	4,436			Alicante
Puig de Massanella	Balearic Island (Mallorca)	1,348	4,423			Balearic Islands
Silla del Cid	Prebaetic System (Sierra del Cid)	1,324	4,344			Alicante
Bañuela	Sierra Morena (Sierra Madrona)	1,322	4,337			Ciudad Real
Corral de Borros	Sierra Morena (Sierra Madrona)	1,312	4,304			Ciudad Real
Peña Mira	Cordillera Cantábrica (Sierra de la Culebra)	1,241	4,072			Zamora
Sant Jeroni	Macizo de Montserrat (Montserrat)	1,236	4,055			Barcelona
El Maigmó	Prebaetic System (Sierra del Maigmó)	1,236	4,055			Alicante
Cabezón de Oro	Prebaetic System (Sierra del Cabezón de Oro)	1,210	3,970			Alicante
El Cid	Prebaetic System (Sierra del Cid)	1,204	3,950			Alicante
Alto del Carrascal	Prebaetic System (Sierra de Aitana)	1,208	3,963			Alicante
El Terril	Sierras Subbéticas	1,132	3,714			Sevilla
Sierra de Bernia	Cordilleras Béticas	1,129	3,704			Alicante
El Peñón de Algámitas	Sierras Subbéticas	1,128	3,701			Sevilla
Caroche	Macizo del Caroig	1,126	3,694			Valencia
Es Teix	Balearic Island (Mallorca)	1,064	3,491			Balearic Islands
el Montcau	Cordilleras Costero Catalanas (Serralada Prelitoral)	1,056	3,465			Barcelona
Valdelatorre	Sistema Ibérico (sierra embidana)	1,030	3,380			Zaragoza
Puig des Galatzó	Balearic Island (Mallorca)	1,027	3,369			Balearic Islands
La Safor	Comunidad Valenciana (Safor)	1,008	3,307			Valencia
Peñas de Aya	Pyrenees	837	2,746			Gipuzkoa
Tellamendi	Basque Mountains	834	2,736			Álava
Jandía	Canary Islands (Fuerteventura)	807	2,648	807	2,648	Las Palmas
Calamorro	Cordilleras Béticas (Sierra de Mijas)	771	2,530			Málaga
Peñas del Chache	Canary Islands (Lanzarote)	670	2,200	670	2,200	Las Palmas
Puig d'Agulles	Serralada Prelitoral (Serralada de l'Ordal)	653	2,142			Barcelona
Sa Talaia	Balearic Island (Ibiza)	475	1,558	475	1,558	Balearic Islands
Montaña de Guaza	Canary Islands (Arona, Tenerife)	428	1,404	725.7	2,381	Canary Islands
Monte Gibalbín	Cordillera Subbética (Sierra Gibalbín)	410	1,350	410	1,350	Sevilla
Puig des Racó	Balearic Island (Mallorca)	386	1,266	386	1,266	Balearic Islands
El Toro	Balearic Island (Menorca)	358	1,175	358	1,175	Balearic Islands

== See also ==
- List of mountains in Aragon
- List of mountains in Catalonia
- List of mountains in the Valencian Community
- List of mountains of La Gomera
