= Taifa of Menorca =

Medieval Islamic taifa kingdom

Coordinates: 39.9667°N 4.0333°E

- 1228–1287
- Capital: Menorca
- Common languages: Andalusi Arabic, Hebrew
- Religion: Islam, Roman Catholicism, Judaism
- Government: Monarchy
- Historical era: Middle Ages
  - Established: 1228
  - Treaty of Capdepera: 1231
  - Conquered by the Crown of Aragon: 1287
- Currency: Dirham and Dinar
Preceded by	Succeeded by
Almohad dynasty	Crown of Aragon

The Taifa of Menorca (Arabic: طائفة منورقة) was a medieval Islamic taifa kingdom vassal to the Crown of Aragon, which existed from 1228 until 1287, when the latter conquered it. It was ruled by the Arabs of the Banu Khazraj tribe.

== List of Emirs ==
=== Hakamid dynasty ===
- Abu Sa'id Utman: c. 1228/9?–1281
- Abu 'Umar: 1281–1287

== See also ==
- List of Sunni Muslim dynasties
