= Villalba de Guardo =

Coordinates: 42°43′N 4°49′W

- municipality
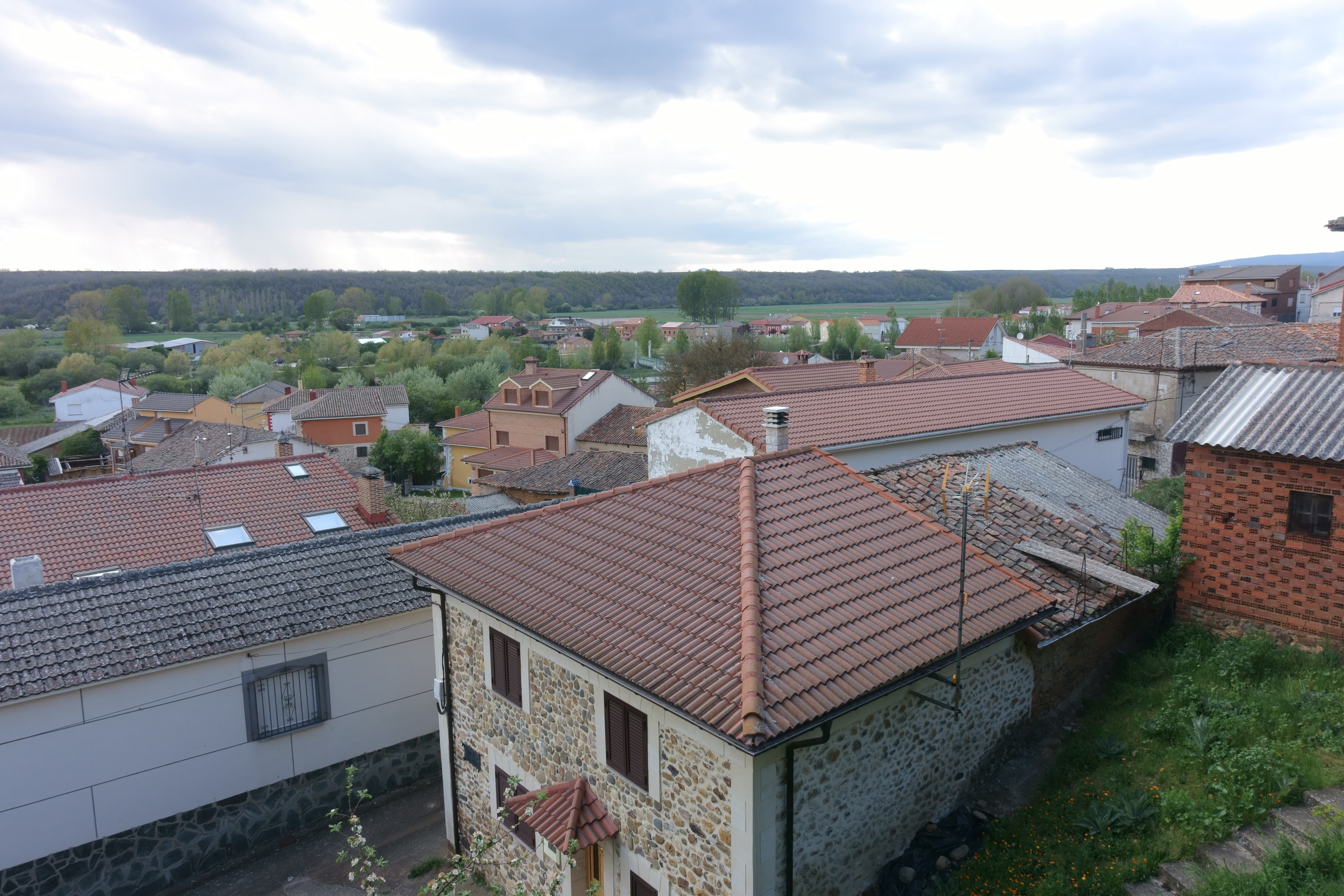

- Coat of arms
- Interactive map of Villalba de Guardo
- Country: Spain
- Autonomous community: Castile and León
- Province: Palencia

Area
  - Total: 34 km^{2} (13 sq mi)

Population (2025-01-01)
  - Total: 194
  - Density: 5.7/km^{2} (15/sq mi)
- Time zone: UTC+1 (CET)
  - Summer (DST): UTC+2 (CEST)
- Website: Official website

Villalba de Guardo is a municipality located in the province of Palencia, Castile and León, Spain. It is situated on the banks of the Carrión River. As of 2025 January 1, the municipality had a population of 194.
