= Menorca (disambiguation) =

Menorca is one of the Balearic Islands in the Mediterranean Sea.

Menorca may also refer to:

== Places ==
- Taifa of Menorca, a medieval Islamic taifa kingdom, vassal to the Crown of Aragon, which existed from 1228 until 1287
- Menorca (Senate constituency)
- Menorca (Parliament of the Balearic Islands constituency)
- Roman Catholic Diocese of Menorca

== Sports ==
- CB Menorca, a Spanish basketball club based in Mahón, Menorca
- CD Menorca, a Spanish football club based in Mahón
- Menorca Bàsquet, a former professional basketball team based in Mahón
- Open Menorca, a tennis tournament played on clay courts in Menorca, starting 2025

== Other uses ==
- Menorca Airport, an international airport on Menorca

== See also ==
- Minorca (disambiguation)
