= Caballo =

Caballo is the Spanish translation of "horse". It may also refer to:

== Places ==
- Caballo, New Mexico
- Caballo Island (in the Philippines)
- Caballo Lake
- Caballo Mountain, Spain
- Caballo Mountains, New Mexico, USA

== Other uses ==
- Caballero, one of the face cards in a Spanish playing card deck
