= Monachil (river) =

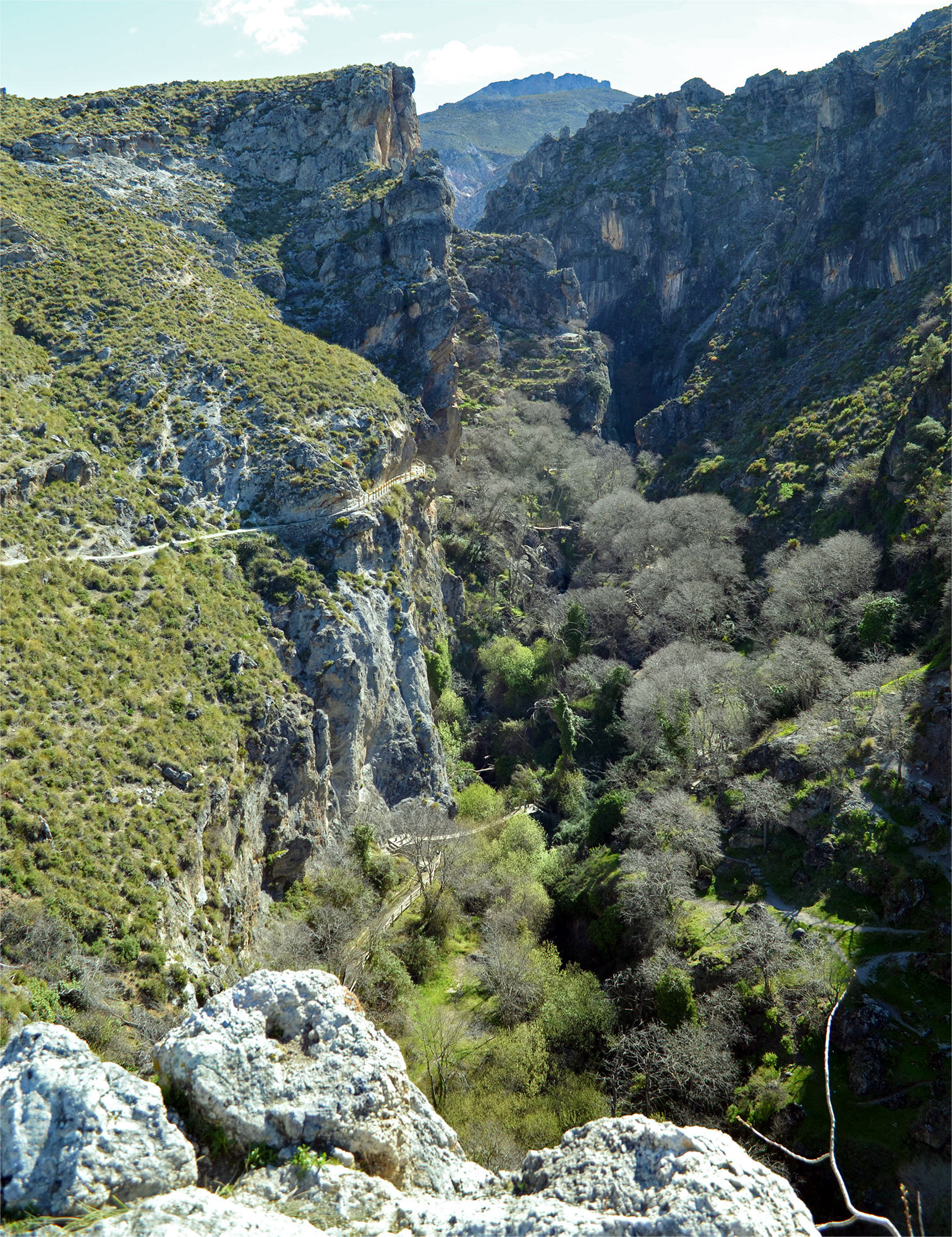

Location
- Country: Spain
- Region: Andalusia
- Province: Granada
- City: Granada

Physical characteristics
- Source
  - location: Veleta
  - elevation: 2,640 m (8,660 ft)
- Mouth: Genil
  - coordinates: 37°09′41″N 3°37′00″W
  - elevation: 650 m (2,130 ft)
- Length: 26.5 km (16.5 mi)

The Monachil River is a river in the province of Granada, Spain. It is a tributary of the Genil. The river receives its name from the municipality Monachil, which the river passes through.

The river has a route of about 26.5 km, and is born at the peak of Veleta, at an altitude of 2,640 meters. The Monachil river is characterised by the predominance of grassland and scrub without trees above its 750 m elevation. The thicket is made up of several species, including Genista, Crataegus, Rosa, Berberis, Lavandula, Salvia, Juniperus, Cistus, Ruscus, and Rosmarinus, accompanied by various herbaceous plants.
