= Abu Uthman Sa'id ibn Hakam al-Qurashi =

Abû ‘Uthman Sa’îd ibn Hakam al Qurashi

Ra'is of Manûrqa
- In office 1234–1282
- Succeeded by: Abû 'Umar ibn Sa'îd

Personal details
- Born: December 30, 1204 Tavira, Algarve (now Portugal)
- Died: January 9, 1282 (aged 77)

Abû ‘Uthman Sa’îd ibn Hakam al-Qurashi (30 December 1204 – 9 January 1282) (Arabic: أبو عثمان سعيد بن الحكم القرشي) was the first Ra’îs of Manûrqa (modern Menorca) from 1234 to 1282.

== Early life ==
Sa’îd ibn Hakam was born in the city of Tavira in the Algarve (modern Portugal). He studied philology at Seville, the capital of the Almohad Caliph of Al Andalus, and took part in literary reunions of famous poets.

Al Andalus had been in a process of decadence primarily due to the downfall of the Abbasid Caliph which meant the closing of a vital commercial relationship. This situation brought a critical spiral of internal conflicts and external invasions. Because of the political instability in Al Andalus, Sa’îd ibn Hakam moved to North Africa, to the cities of Bejaïa and Tunis, where he served as secretary to the Almohad governors.

== Al-Motaserrif of Manûrqa ==
Two years later, he planned to return to Al Andalus, but the situation had worsened, so he was given refuge by the Almohad wali of Medina Mayurqa (modern Mallorca). He was then sent to Manûrqa as al-Motaserrif in 1227. His mission was to collect and administrate the taxes and command the army.

In 1229, James I of Aragon invaded Mayurqa, but did not take any action at that moment against Manûrqa. By 1231, the resistance of Mayurqa’s Muslims was finally crushed and James I sent three ambassadors to Manûrqa, Berenguer de Santa Eugenia, Don Assalit de Gudar and Don Pere Maça, to negotiate its submission to the Crown of Aragon. James I, who at that time had a small number of troops, ordered fires to be set on the coast facing Manûrqa as to simulate a larger army and thus put more pressure on the Muslims. After a meeting between the Kadī Abû ‘Abd Allah Muhammad, Sa’îd ibn Hakam, the sheiks and three hundred of the principal people of the island, they agreed to become vassals to the new King of Majorca. The treaty of Capdepera was signed on 17 June 1231. It was rumoured that Sa’îd ibn Hakam was the real instigator of the treaty with James I, although his role in the text of the treaty was discreet. The treaty gave wide political autonomy to the island and the military protection of the island by the King of Majorca in exchange for the payment of an annual tribute of three thousand quarters of wheat, a hundred cows and five hundred goats or sheep, later adding two “quintals” (hundredweight) of fresh butter and two hundred bezants for leave to transport the cattle. Abû ‘Abd Allah Muhammad was the new ruler of Manûrqa.

== Rise to power ==
In July 1234, Sa’îd ibn Hakam took over power through an armed coup and negotiated a new treaty with James I, in which he ruled alone with the title of Ra’îs of Manùrqa. This is believed to be the only time in the history of the island that it was an independent political entity, although tributary to the Kingdom of Majorca. Under his harsh rule, Manûrqa became an Islamic law-abiding structured state. It is said that he executed by beheading those Muslims found drunk. He constructed a strong political apparatus in Madina al Jazira (modern Ciutadella) with a council of ministers, secretaries and clan representatives, and a small military force consisting of mercenaries. His political shrewdness allowed for the survival of this Islamic entity while other Muslim territories fell to the Christian Reconquista: Cordoba (1236), his hometown Tavira (1242), and Seville (1248). Only the Kingdom of Granada remained independent, although vassal to the Kingdom of Castille.

At the death of James I (1276), the Crown of Aragon was split in two: the Kingdom of Majorca (the Balearic Islands and counties of Roussillon and Cerdagne) went to his son James and the Crown of Aragon (The Principality of Catalonia and the kingdoms of Aragon and Valencia) to his other son Peter. Manûrqa remained tributary to James II. This division would ultimately mean the fall of Manûrqa.

Sa’îd ibn Hakam died in 1282 in Madina al Jazira, and his son Abû 'Umar ibn Sa'îd became the next and last Ra’îs of Manûrqa. Sa’îd ibn Hakam was also an important Islamic intellectual figure of the 13th century, learned in Islamic law and medicine, philologist, grammarian and poet. He managed a great library at Madina al Jazira. Some samples of this collection are kept in the library of El Escorial.

== Footnotes ==
1. (Arabic) Chief, leader.
2. (Arabic) Governor.
3. (Arabic) Tax-collector or Minister of Finances.
4. (Arabic) Judge

Preceded by (New creation)	Ra'îs of Manûrqa; 1234—1282	Succeeded by Abû 'Umar ibn Sa'îd
