= Minorca (disambiguation) =

Minorca is the older English name for Menorca, one of the Balearic Islands in the Mediterranean Sea.

Minorca or Menorca may also refer to:

== Places ==
- Minorca, a large residential area of New Smyrna Beach, Florida, United States
- Minorca, Louisiana, United States, an unincorporated community and census-designated place
- Minorca, Isle of Man, an area of Laxey village
  - Minorca Halt, a stop on the Manx Electric Railway

== Ships ==
- HMS Minorca, four Royal Navy ships
- Minorca (1799 ship), a ship used to transport convicts to Sydney, arriving on 1801

== Other uses ==
- Battle of Minorca (1756), a naval battle in which the French defeated the British
- Battle of Minorca (1939), one of the last battles of the Spanish Civil War, won by the Nationalists
- Minorca chicken, a breed of domestic chicken originating in the Mediterranean island of Menorca

== See also ==
- Menorca (disambiguation)
