= Castle of Capdepera =

Walled fortress in Majorca, Spain

The Castle of Capdepera
- Castell de Capdepera
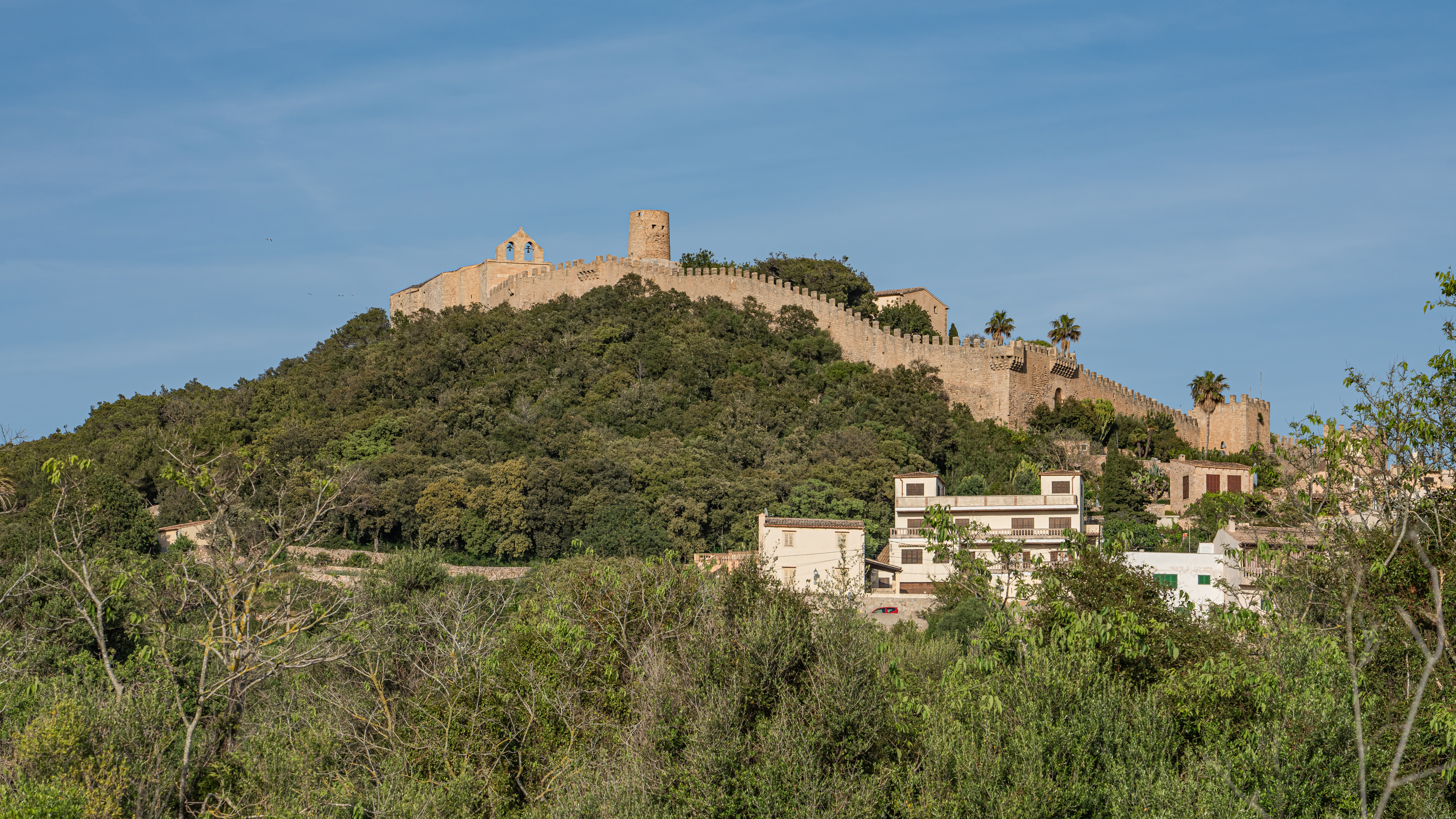
- Interactive map of The Castle of Capdepera
- Location: Majorca
- Coordinates: 39°42′N 3°25′E
- Type: Fortress

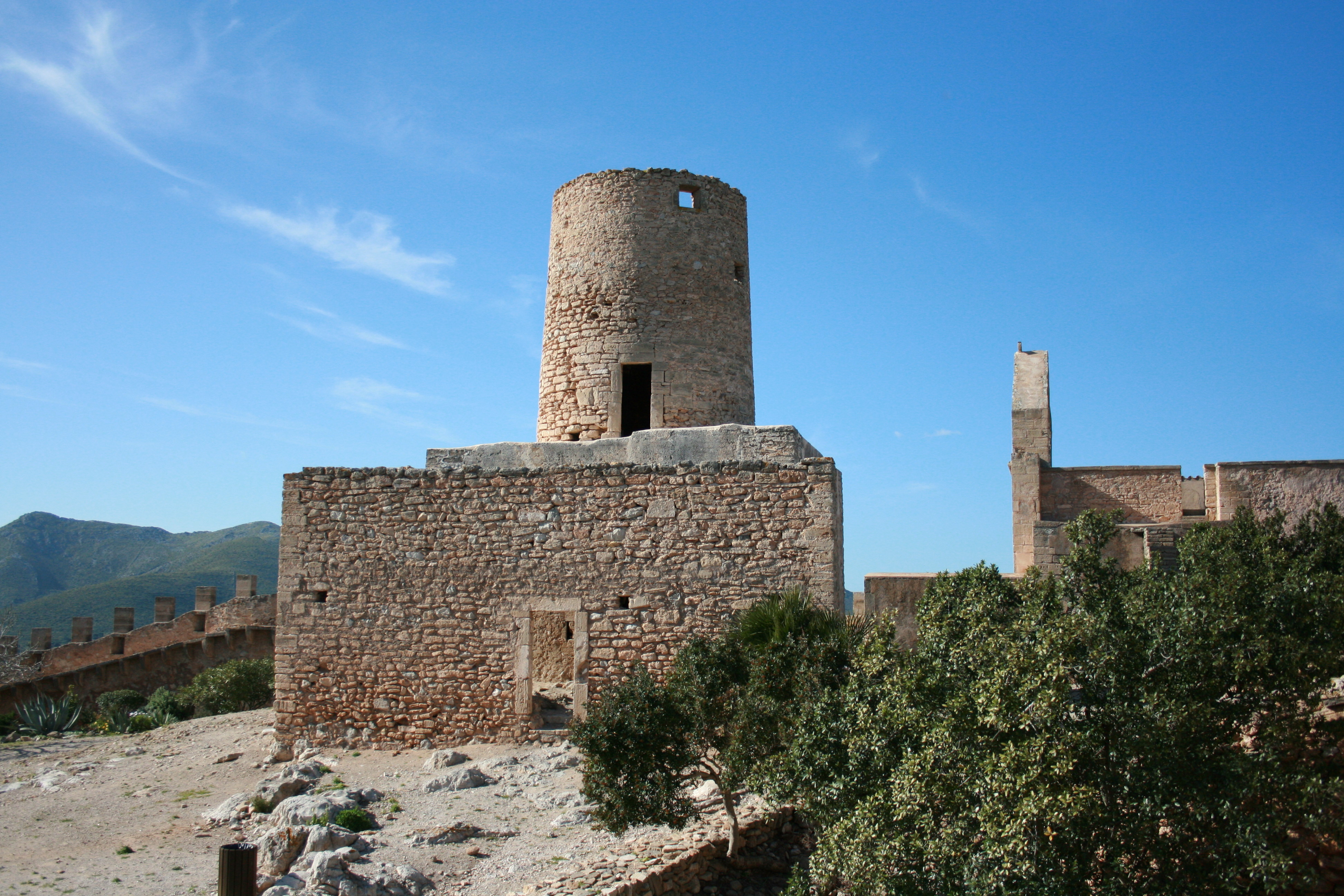

The Castle of Capdepera is a walled fortress located in the Spanish municipality of Capdepera, on the island of Mallorca. It is one of the largest castles on the island. Its construction began in 1310, but in the fourteenth century it was rebuilt on the remains of a Muslim village.

== History ==
The Castle of Capdepera is important to the island as it was from here that the surrender of Menorca, the island neighbouring Majorca in the Balearic archipelago, was accomplished. King James I of Aragon, having conquered Majorca, decided he needed his troops for the future conquest of Valencia. He devised a ploy to deceive the Muslims residing on Menorca and cause them to surrender. To do this, he ordered a large number of bonfires lit in Capdepera so that they were visible from the neighbouring island. This was to make the Saracen Menorcans believe that a large army had camped there and were preparing to invade Menorca. The ruse worked. So finally, at this very castle, James I signed the Treaty of Capdepera, through which the Menorcan Muslims were allowed to remain there in submission to the King of Aragon under tribute.

The first construction of a fortress on this site was by Romans. It was later enlarged by the Moors. It was destroyed during Christian invasions but they later constructed another structure in the same location in the fourteenth century.

King James II (1285–1295) having already founded the town of Capdepera in 1300 [?], ordered the population of the area, which had been scattered, to build the walled enclosure surrounding one of its watchtowers now known as Miquel Nunis. Its strategic location on a hill allowed them to view the adjacent lands and sea channel separating the two islands.

The castle was occupied by military troops up to 1854 when it was abandoned. From then until 1983 it was under private ownership. At that time the owners donated it to the Capdepera Town Council. In 2000 the council organized a celebration of the 700th year since the founding of the castle. It remains open for tourist viewing throughout the year.

== See also ==
- Cuevas del Drach
