= Pico del Caballo =

Mountain in Spain

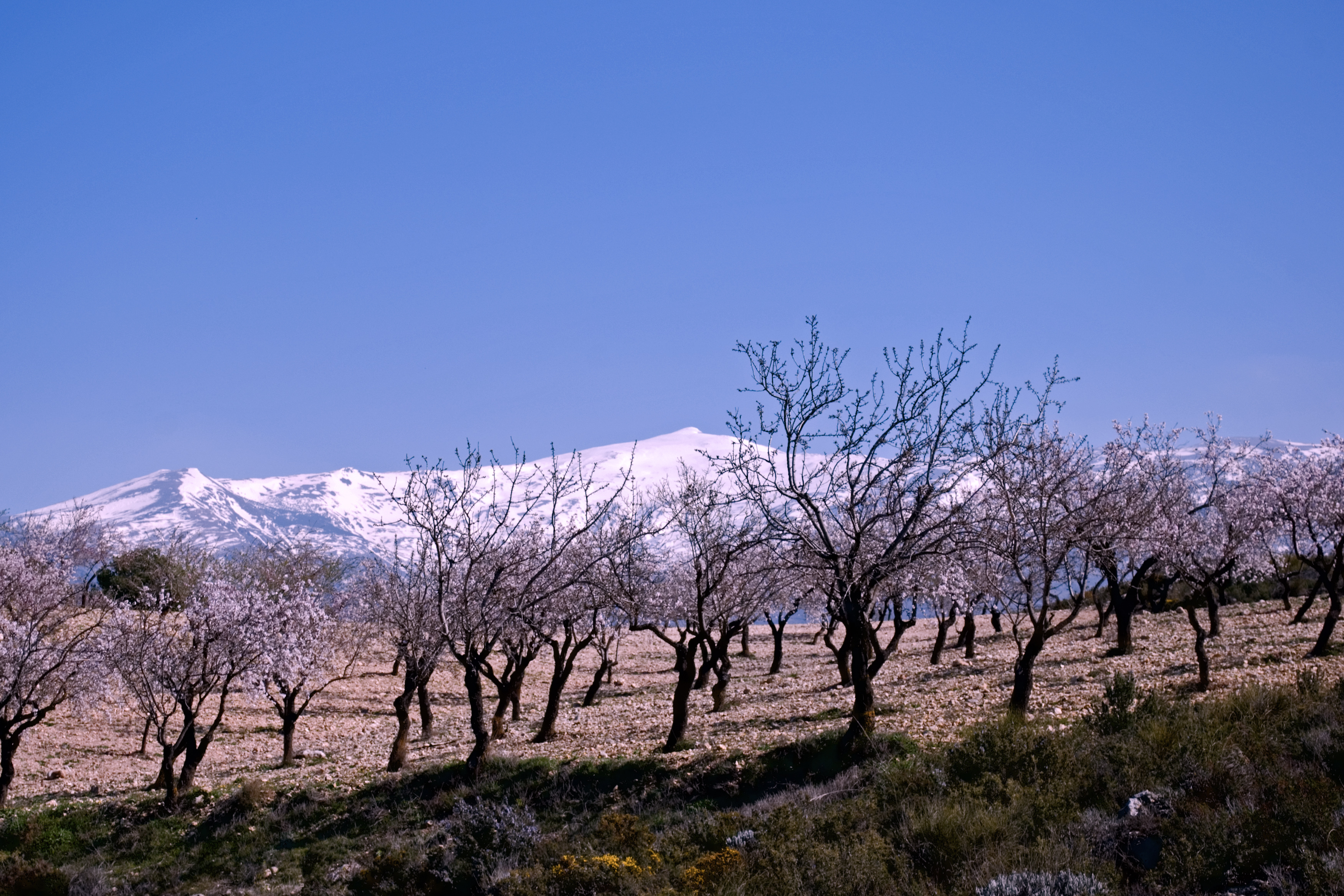
- View of the Pico del Caballo behind almond trees

Highest point
- Elevation: 3,011 m (9,879 ft)
- Listing: Mountains of Spain
- Coordinates: 37°00′43″N 3°26′23″W

Geography
- Location within Spain
- Country: Spain
- Community: Andalusia
- Province: Granada
- Parent range: Penibaetic System

Geology
- Mountain type: Mica-Schist

Climbing
- First ascent: Unknown
- Easiest route: From Nigüelas or Lanjarón

Pico del Caballo, Cerro del Caballo or simply Caballo ("horse") is a 3,011-metre (9,879 ft) high mountain in the Sierra Nevada, Spain. It is the westernmost three-thousander of the range.

== Climbing ==
Pico del Caballo can be reached from the towns of Lanjarón and Durcal and also from the Sierra Nevada Ski Station. This ski resort is located at Pradollano, on the northwest flank of Pico de Veleta. There is a hut on the east side of Pico del Caballo at an altitude of 2800 meters. The hut can accommodate eight people and can be used year round. It is categorized as a bivouac, which means that it is intended to give protection only. Other huts, such as the Poqueira hut, are guarded and usually provide meals and heating. Another nearby hut is the Elorrieta hut, at the summit of Tajos de la Virgen mountain. The nearest source of water is the Río Lanjarón on the south side of Pico del Caballo. There are also tiny rivers on the west side of the mountain at an altitude of 2500 metres. These seasonal rivers can be difficult to find sometimes. During the winter months, the mountains of the Sierra Nevada experience alpine conditions, although there are few remaining glaciers anymore. Nevertheless, ice-axes and crampons are essential when climbing in this area.

== Around the mountain ==
Pico de Caballo offers great views of the neighbouring mountains like : Veleta, Mulhacén and Alcazaba. The ridge starting from Caballo continues several km almost at the same altitude, turning at the Tajos de la Virgen mountain (3237 m.). The ridge has become very popular during recent years, as it provides an easy walk and scramble during summer months. From Tajos de la Virgen the ridge turns towards the southwest, ending at the south side of Caballo mountain and making a big letter Y. The highest peak on the southern ridge is Tajo de los Machos at 3088 m. At the middle of the two ridges starts the river Río Lanjarón, 400 m lower. Río Lanjarón flows several km down towards the town of Lanjarón. There are also a few lakes in this wide mountain valley.
