= Ra'îs of Manûrqa =

Political title used by 13th-century Muslim rulers of Menorca

The Ra'îs of Manûrqa is a Muslim political title given to the two governors that from 1234 to 1287 ruled the island of Manûrqa (modern Menorca) as a vassal state of the Christian Kingdom of Majorca. During this period, the island was allowed a great deal of autonomy and it had the protection of the Kingdom of Majorca in exchange for an annual tribute.

== List of Ra'îs of Manûrqa ==
- Abû 'Uthmân Sa'îd ibn Hakam al Qurashi (1234–1282)
- Abû 'Umar ibn Sa'îd (1282–1287)
