= Puig des Racó =

Hill in Mallorca, Spain

- Puig des Recò
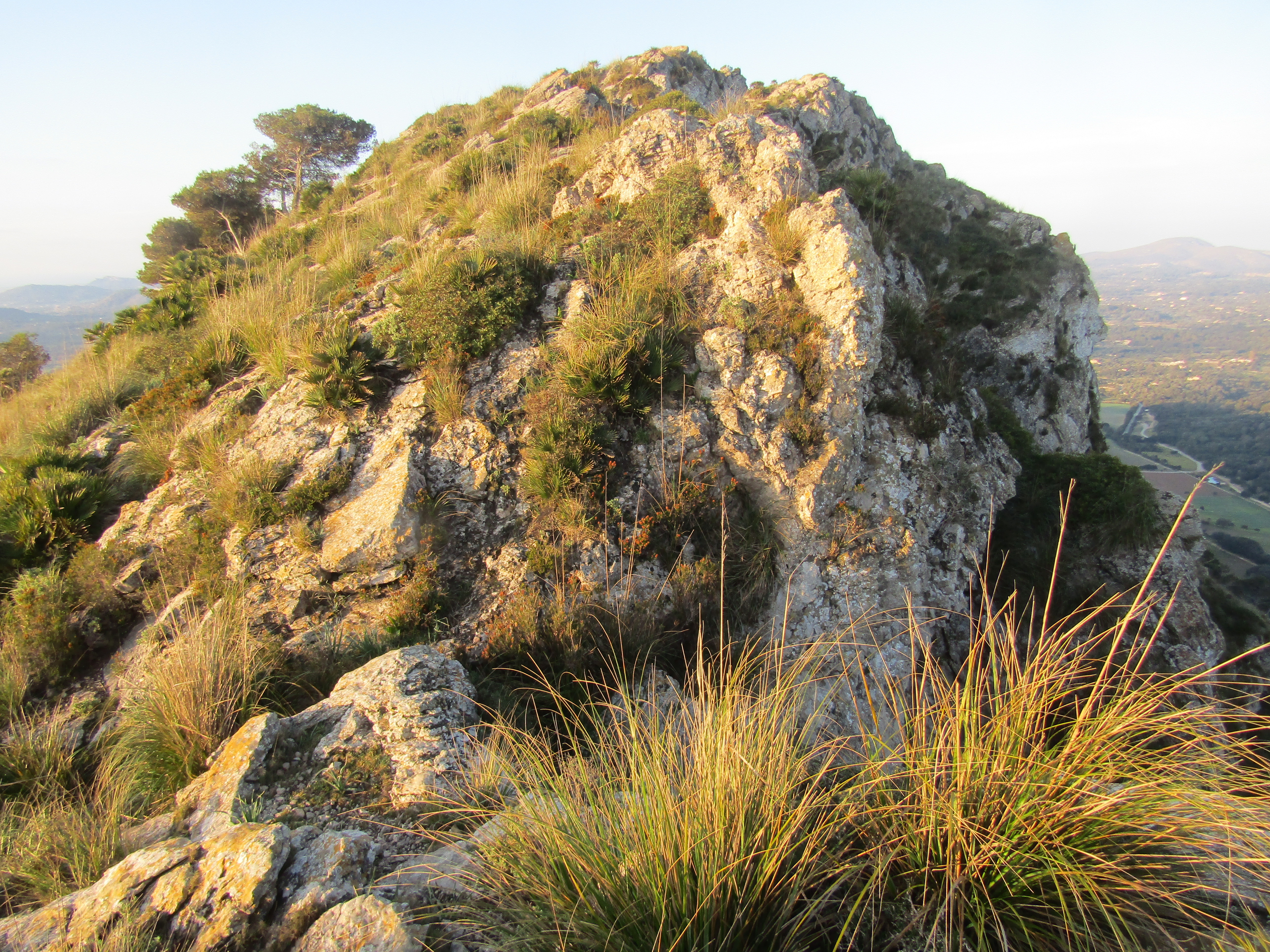
- Puig des Racó: the summit

Highest point
- Elevation: 386 m (1,266 ft)
- Prominence: 170 m (560 ft)
- Coordinates: 39°42′41″N 3°23′28″E

Geography
- Location within Mallorca Location within Spain
- Location: Majorca, Spain
- Parent range: Serres de Llevant

Climbing
- First ascent: ancestral
- Easiest route: footpath from Coll des Racó

The Puig des Racó (or Puig des Recò) is a hill in the northeast of the Spanish island of Mallorca.

== Geography ==
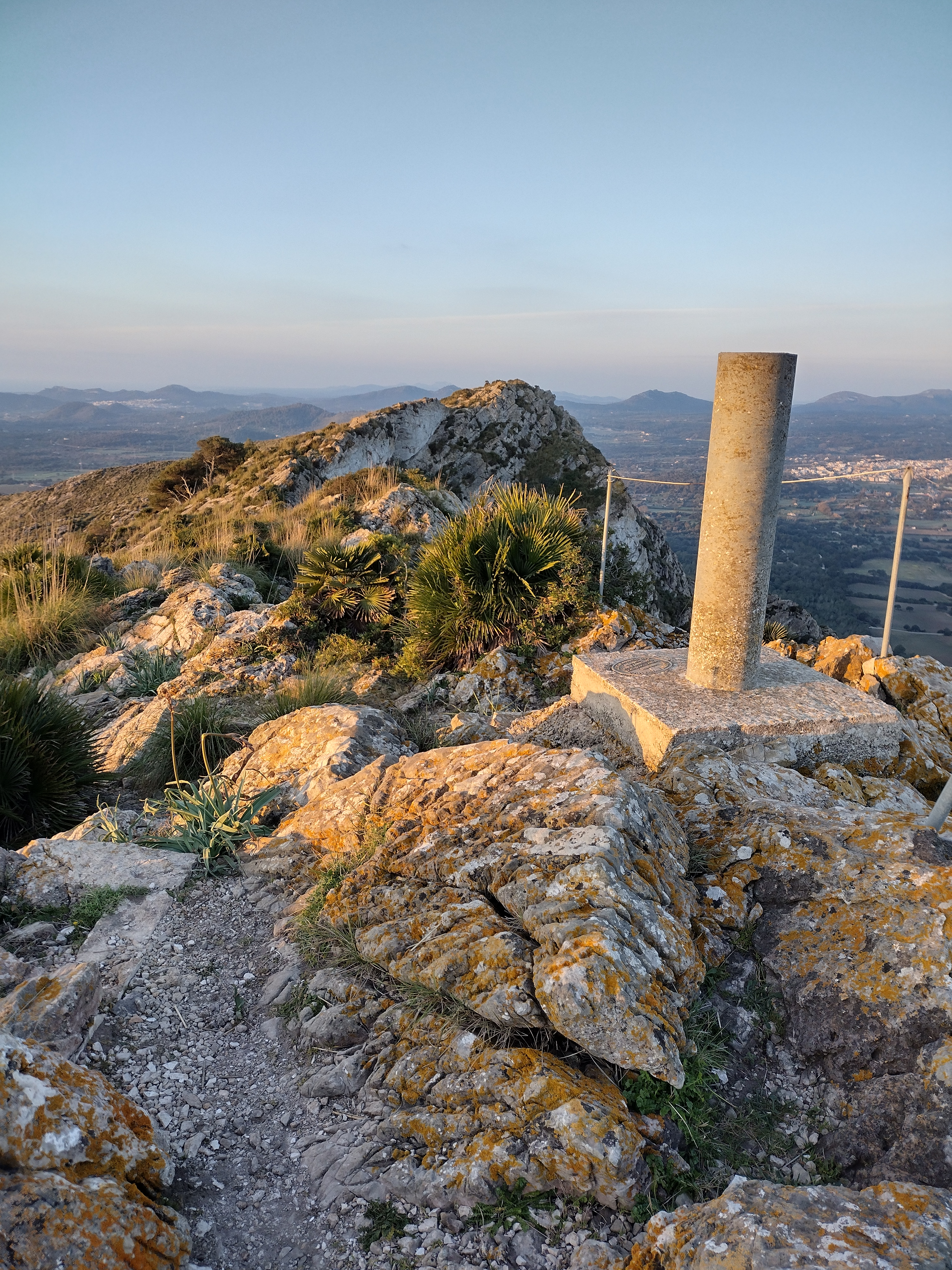
The trig point at the subsummit

The hill belongs to the Artà mountains, the northern part of the Serres de Llevant mountain range. Its summit reaches an elevation of 386 meters; a saddle at 371 m divides it from a subsummit marked by a trig point at an elevation of 385 m. The municipal boundary between Artà (West of the hill) and Capdepera (East) runs along its crest. Within the municipality of Capdepera, the Puig de Racó is the highest point. At the foot of its western flank runs the road from Artà to Cala Torta from south-west to north-east, while south of the hill runs the provincial road Ma-15 between Artà and Capdepera. Northwest of the Puig des Racó rises the Puig Poca Son, to which it is connected by the Coll des Racó saddle, at 233 m of elevation. Northeast the saddle named Coll de ses Buines (312 m) connects Puig des Racò with the Puig Poloni (363 m). At the southwestern spur of the hill lies the archaeological site of Talaiot de ses Planetes. From the mountain spring some small streams which only occasionally carry water.

== Access to the summit ==
The NE subsummit of the hill can be easily reached following a good footpath starting from the Colle des Racó; the main summit of the hill needs some scrambling but no alpinistic skills.

== See also ==
- List of mountains in Spain

== Photo gallery ==
Media related to Puig des Racó at Wikimedia Commons

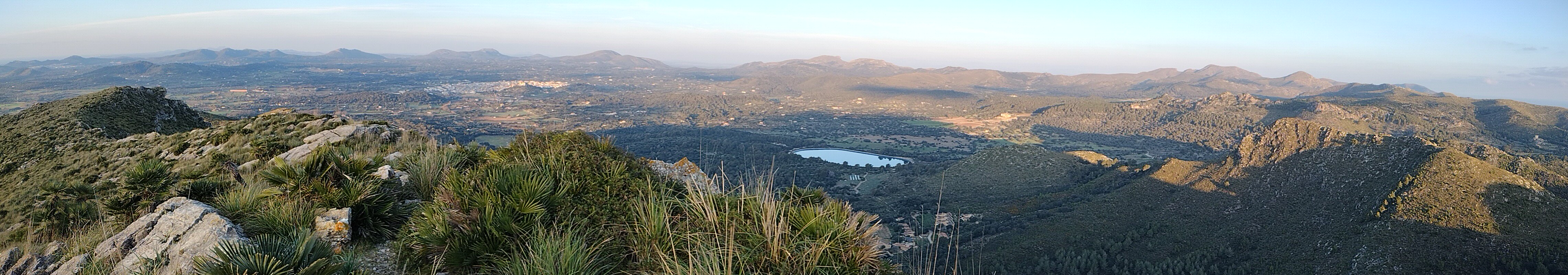
Southward panorama

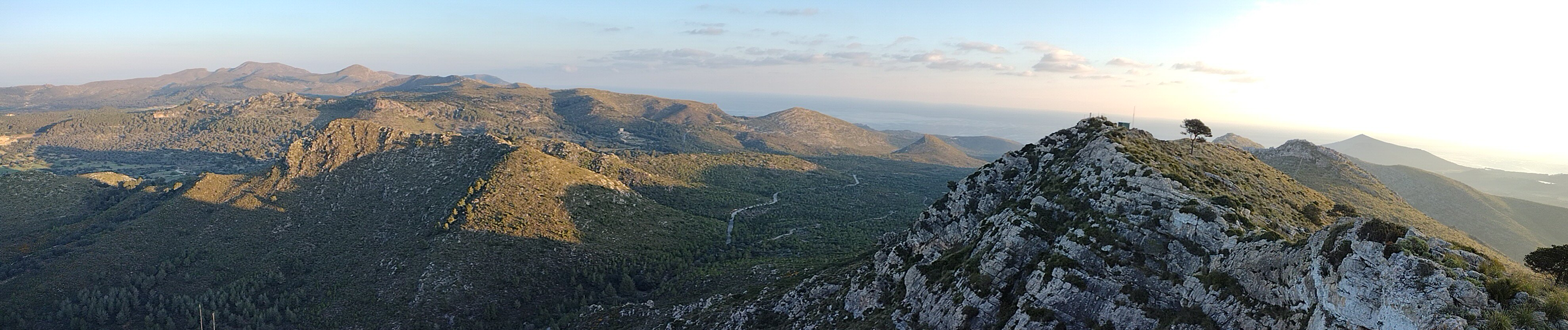
Northward panorama
