= Treaty of Capdepera =

1231 treaty between Aragon and Menorca

The Treaty of Capdepera was an agreement signed between King James I of Aragon and Abu'Abd Allah Muhammad, the Muslim qadi on the island of Menorca, on June 17, 1231, in the current Majorcan town of Capdepera. The treaty was signed at the Castle of Capdepera, in what was known as the "Torre den Nunis". The treaty permitted the island of Menorca to remain under Muslim rule, while remaining subject to the Aragonese king by means of the payment of a tribute.

Having conquered Majorca, James I decided against an invasion of the neighbouring island because he needed the forces for the conquest of Valencia. Thus he resorted to a stratagem of dissuasion. He ordered huge bonfires, which could be seen from Menorca, to be lit in the town so that the Muslims who lived there would think that there was a great army ready to invade. The committee in charge of going to Menorca to parley was formed by the Master of the Knights Templar, Fray Ramón de Serra, the knight Bernardo de Santa Eugenia, and Pero Masa, lord of Sangarrén.
