= Matagalls =

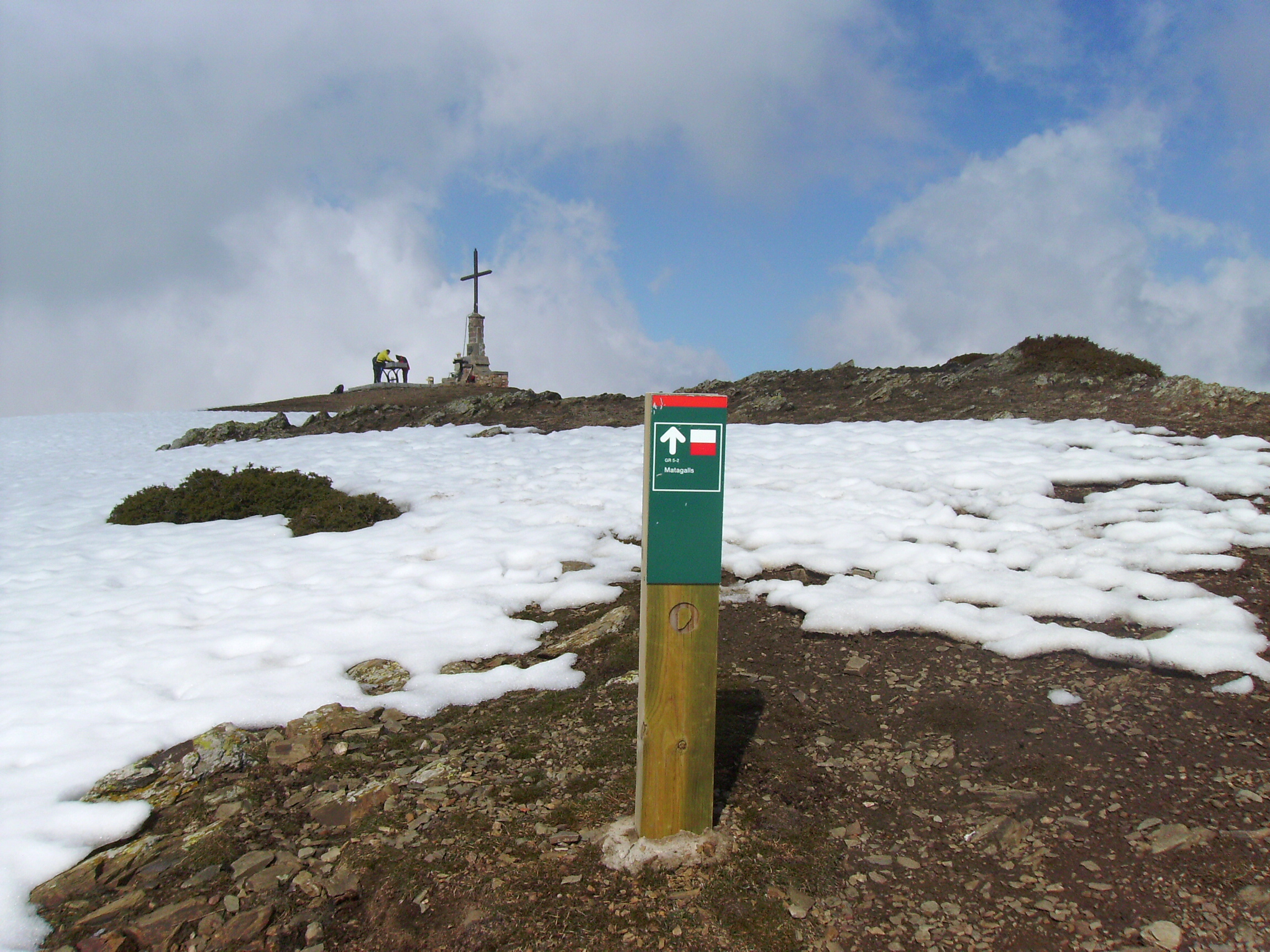
- Matagalls summit in the winter

Highest point
- Elevation: 1,697 m (5,568 ft)
- Coordinates: 41°48′31.66″N 2°22′57.86″E

Geography
- Location: Vallès Oriental, Osona, Catalonia
- Parent range: Montseny

Climbing
- First ascent: Unknown
- Easiest route: From Sant Marçal or Coll Formic

Matagalls is one of the highest mountains of the Montseny Massif, Catalonia, Spain. It has an elevation of 1,697.9 metres above sea level.

It's the starting point of many popular hikes, like the Matagalls-Montserrat.

== See also ==
- Catalan Pre-Coastal Range
- Mountains of Catalonia
