= Abû 'Umar ibn Sa'îd =

Abû ‘Umar ibn Sa’îd

Ra'is of Manûrqa
- In office 1282–1287
- Preceded by: Abu Uthman Sa'id ibn Hakam al-Qurashi

Personal details
- Born: Tavira, Algarve (now Portugal)
- Died: 1287

Abû ‘Umar ibn Sa’îd (Arabic: أبو عمر بن سعيد) (died c. 1287) was son of Abû 'Uthmân Sa'îd ibn Hakam al Qurashi and last ra’îs of Manûrqa (1282–1287).

In his first year in government, King Peter III of Aragon and his fleet stopped by Manurqa on their way to the city of Constantine (North Africa). Bugron, the Lord of Constantine, had secretly plotted with Peter to convert to Christianity and surrender the city to the Crown of Aragon. According to Ramon Muntaner’s Cronica, Abû ‘Umar sent messengers to North Africa letting know of this plot. The consequences were that Bugron was executed and Peter’s surprise invasion was discovered.

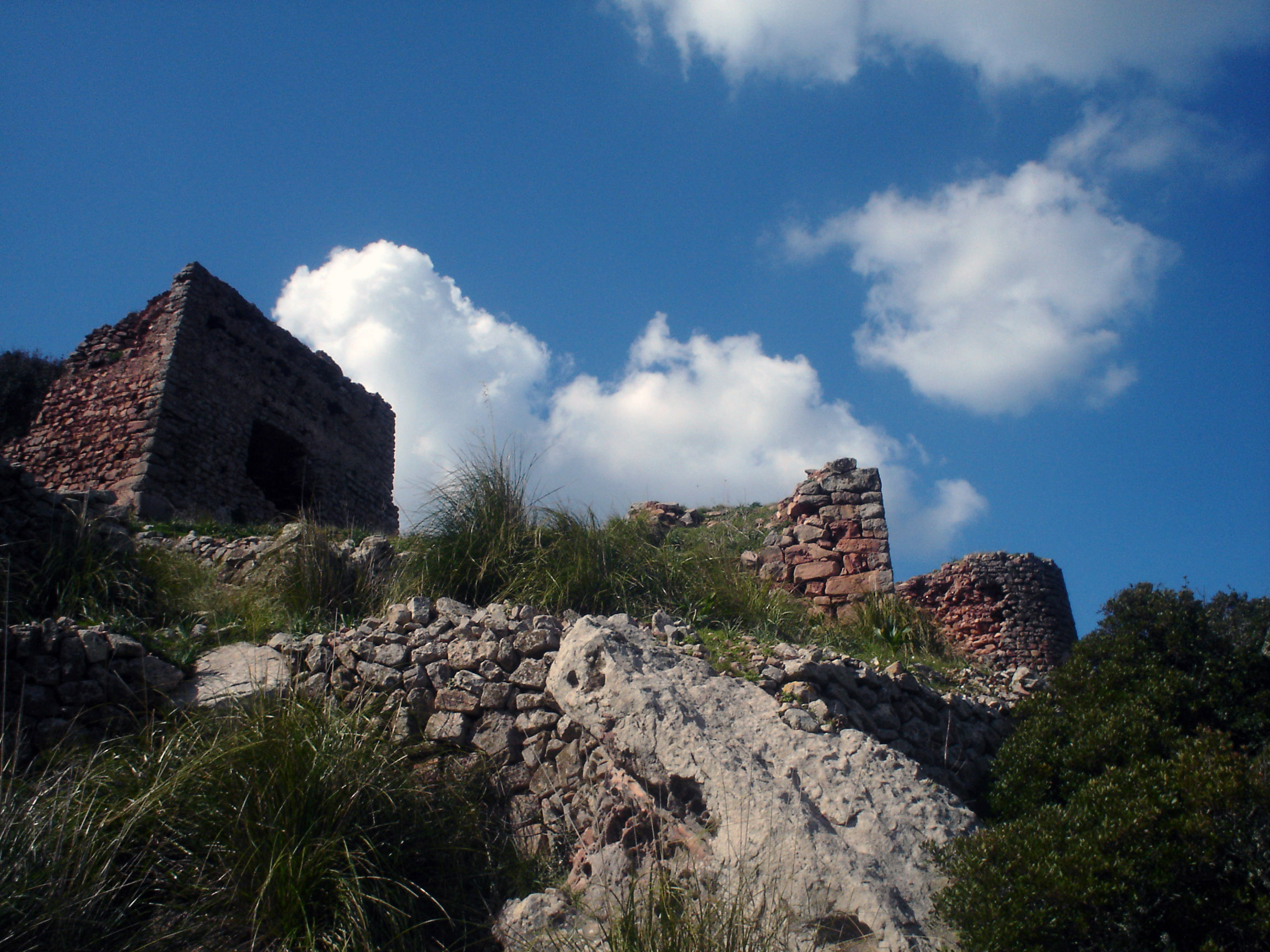
Ruins of the fortress of Santa Àgueda

Years later, Peter and King James II of Majorca, (Menorca’s vassal lord) came into a dispute. Peter’s son King Alfons III of Aragon set out from Salou on 22 November 1286 with an invasion force against Manûrqa. This was both to avenge Abû ‘Umar ibn Sa’îd and James II. He arrived on 5 January 1287. Abû ‘Umar ibn Sa’îd prepared himself with mercenary troops from North Africa. The first battle took place on 17 January. Alfons won this battle and Abû ‘Umar ibn Sa’îd and a few of his followers fled to the fortress near Madina al Jazira, nowadays known as the fortress of Santa Àgueda.

On 21 January, Abû ‘Umar ibn Sa’îd, seeing himself outnumbered, signed his surrender with the treaty of San Agayz. He was allowed to leave the island towards North Africa, with two hundred of his followers, the remains of his father, his library and fifty swords. Alfons chartered him a ship manned by a Genoese, which according to Muntaner, encountered a storm off the North African coast and was destroyed. There were no survivors.

== Notes ==
Arabic Chief, leader.

== Sources ==
- Ramón Muntaner, Chronicle, tr. Lady Goodenough (available in PDF format).

Preceded by: Abû 'Uthmân Sa'îd ibn Hakam al Qurashi	Ra'îs of Manûrqa	Succeeded by: Abû 'Umar ibn Sa'îd was the last Ra'îs of Manûrqa
