= Fuentes Carrionas =

Mountain range in Spain

Coordinates: 43.0136°N 4.73139°W

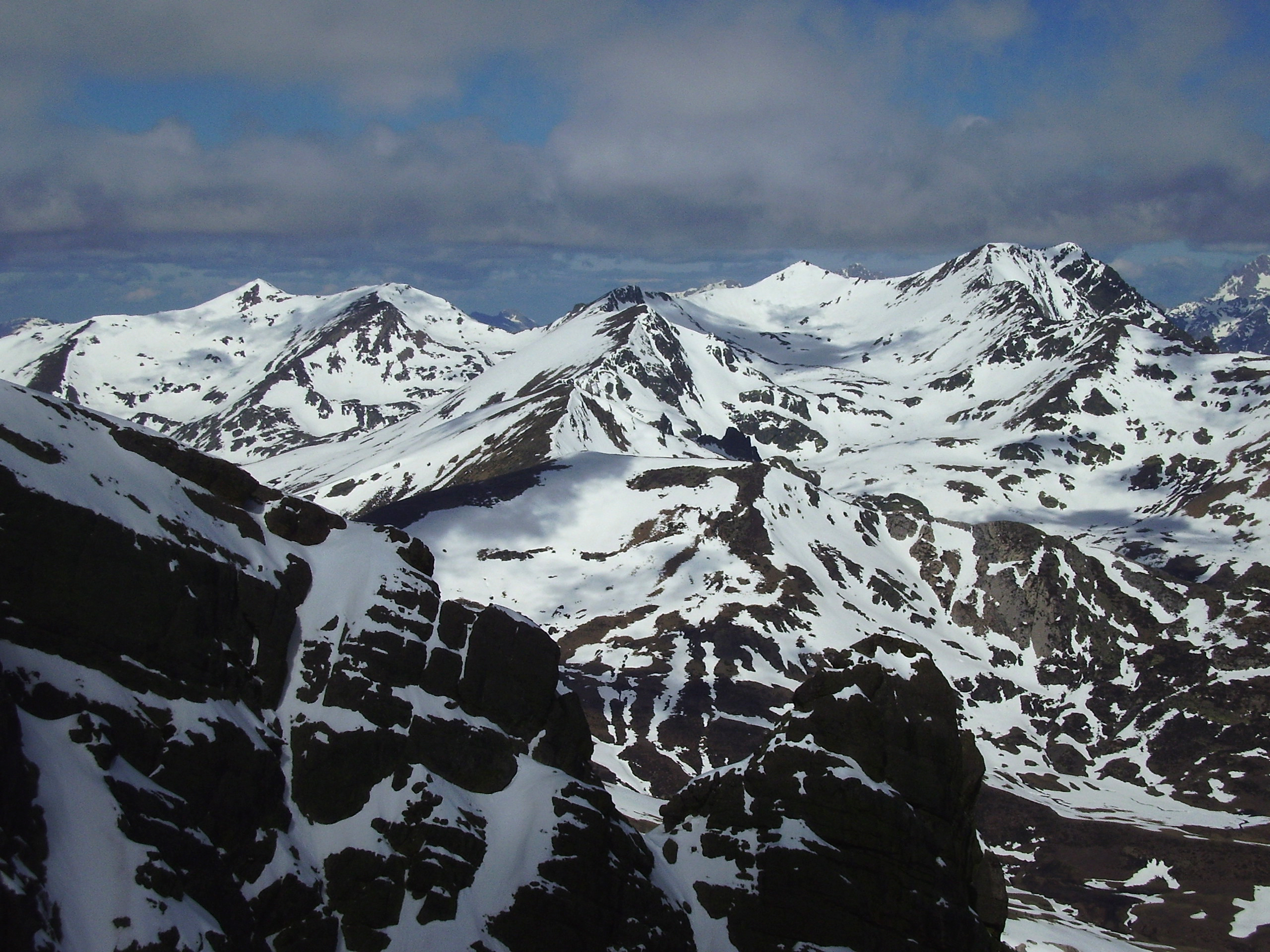
View of Peña Prieta (on the right).

The Fuentes Carrionas is a mountain range belonging to Spain's Cantabrian Mountains. The massif is in the north of the province of Palencia, and also falls within the boundaries of province of León and Cantabria.

The range has seasonal snow cover and is the source of the river Carrión. Its highest peak is Peña Prieta, with 2538 m.

== See also ==
- Natural Park of Fuentes Carrionas and Fuente Cobre-Montaña Palentina
