= Peña Cebollera =

Mountain in Spain

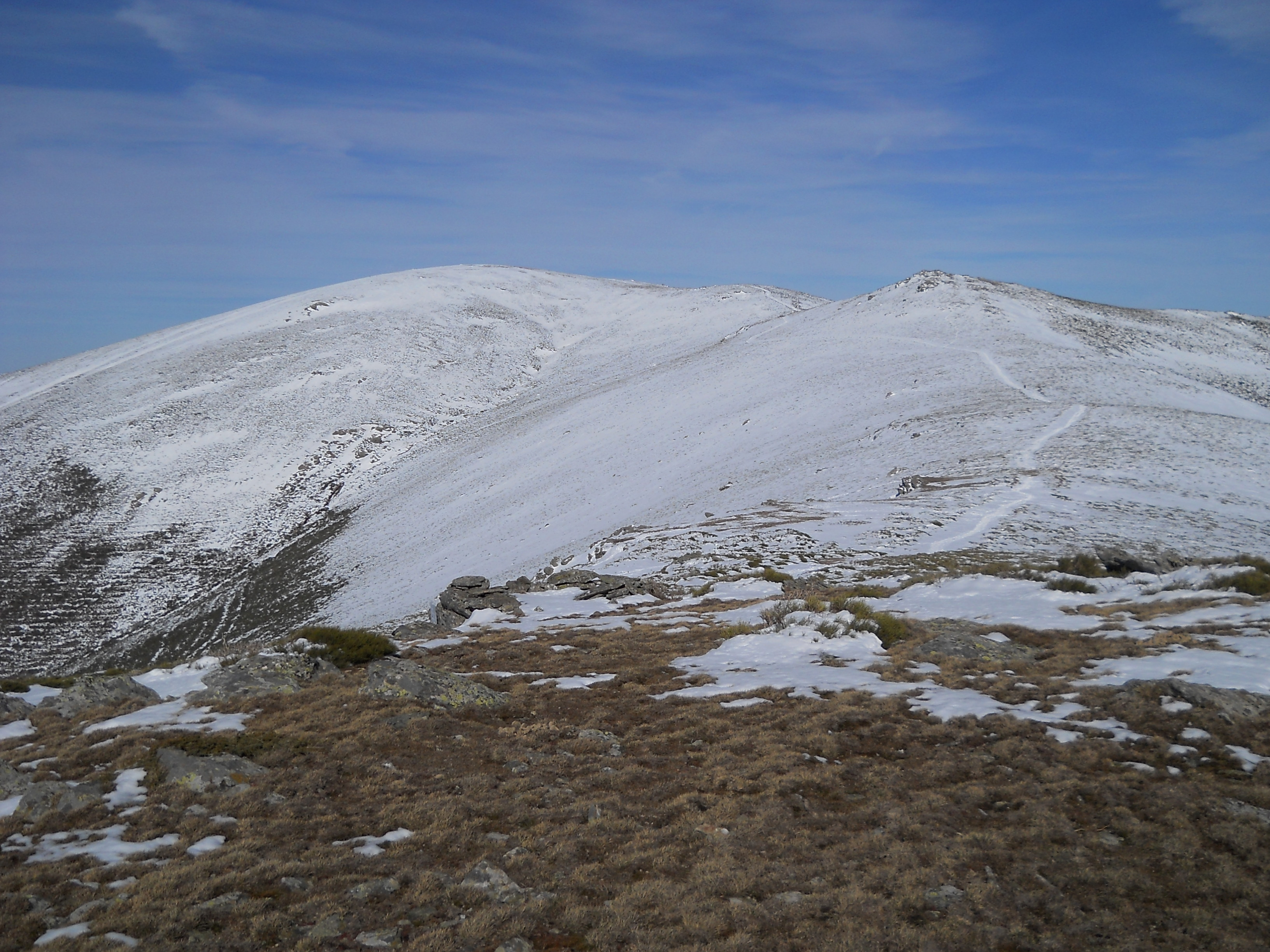
Cebollera Vieja

Peña Cebollera, Cebollera Vieja or pico de las Tres Provincias is a mountain which is part of Sierra de Ayllón mountain range in Sistema Central system of mountain ranges. A tripoint related to the autonomous communities of Madrid, Castilla–La Mancha and Castile and León is located on this elevation. The height of this landform is 2,129 metres (6985 feet).
