= Tellamendi =

- Belamendi
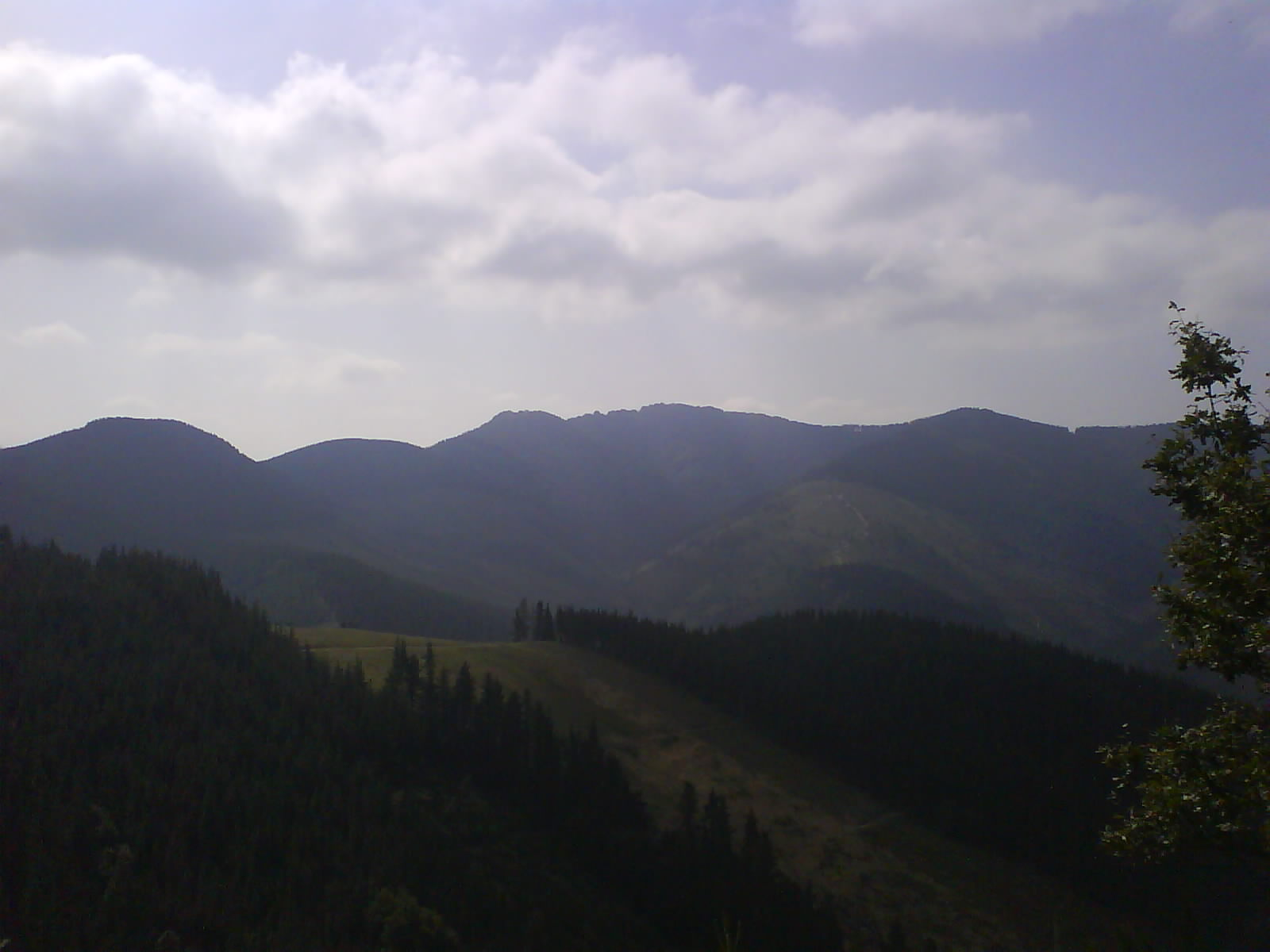

Highest point
- Elevation: 827 m (2,713 ft)
- Prominence: 112 m (367 ft)
- Coordinates: 43°04′05.0″N 2°33′32.9″W

Geography
- Location within Spain
- Location: Álava, Basque Country, Spain
- Country: Spain
- Province: Álava
- Parent range: Basque Mountains

Tellamendi, also referred to as Belamendi, is a mountain situated in the Basque Mountains in the Álava province of Basque Country in Spain. It has an altitude of 834 metres (2,736 ft), though this has been disputed and also claimed to be 827 metres (2,713 ft). It is situated at the base of Anboto (1331 m) as part of the grassy mountain range towards the south-west that comes off Zabalaundi (895 m). The range shifts direction after reaching Tellamendi to the north towards Besaide.

== Cross ==
The top of Tellamendi is adorned by a large cross easily visible from the town of Aramaio and the surrounding area. The original cross was constructed over the course of a few months starting on July 31, 1935. Upon its completion, it was transported with the help of oxen from nearby farmhouses and raised at the top of the mountain on September 15, 1935. The cross was inscribed with the following Basque passage:

Belamendiko gurutz deuna
Aretxabaleta'n egin
eta Aramayotarak jasorikua
zabalzu egizu ibar onetan
gizarte pakea eta zoriona

— Cross of Tellamendi, 1935
Translation:

The Holy Cross of Belamendi
Made in Aretxabaleta
and received by the Aramaeans
spread it in good valleys
social peace and happiness

The cross avoided any significant damage for 50 years and was largely unscathed by the Spanish Civil War and the Spanish Republic, though sometime between the raising of the cross and 1937 the inscription was damaged. This changed when the Spanish Civil Guard was called in on January 1, 1977 to handle the disposal of a 4 kg dynamite explosive placed next to a Basque flag. It was determined that the device could not be disarmed safely, and so was intentionally detonated. The detonation completely ruined the cross, which upset many of the people of Aramaio who were proud of the cross and all that it survived. They staged demonstrations demanding the reconstruction of the cross. On March 15, 1977, a second cross was erected upon the ruins of the first with an additional inscription plate, added adjacent to the recovered inscription of the first, reading:

Lurgorrik jaso nindun
lerkariak irauli
berriz zutik nauzute
esker herriari
mendi tontor honetan
guztion zaindari

— Cross of Tellamendi, 1977
Translation:

The landslide that picked me up
turned me
upside down again
thanks to the people
on this mountain top
guardian of all
