= Carrión (river) =

River in Spain

Coordinates: 42.3190°N 4.6119°W

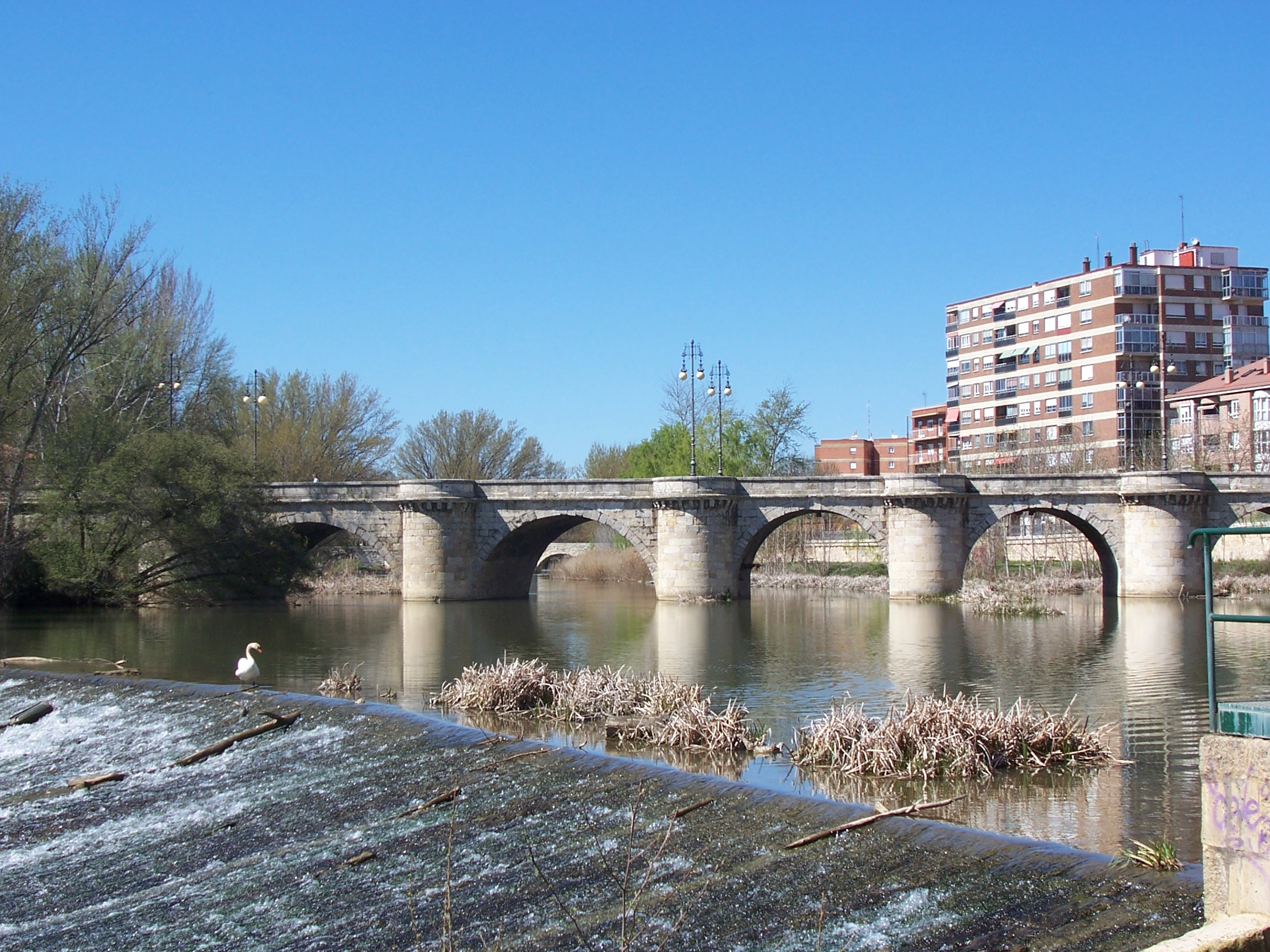
- The Carrión in Palencia

Location
- Country: Spain

Physical characteristics
- Source
  - location: Fuentes Carrionas, Province of Palencia
- Mouth
  - location: Pisuerga River
- Length: 179 km (111 mi)
- Basin size: 3,351 km^{2} (1,294 sq mi)

The Carrión is a river in northern Spain in the province of Palencia.

== Information of the river ==
The river through the province of Palencia. It is a tributary of the Pisuerga River, which in turn flows along the right bank of the Douro River. The river originates from Fuentes Carrionas, belonging to the network of natural spaces within the Montaña Palentina natural park and passes through Velilla del Río Carrión, Guardo, Saldaña, La Serna, Carrión de los Condes, Villoldo, Monzón de Campos, the city of Palencia, and Villamuriel de Cerrato.

The river joins with the Pisuerga River in the municipality of Dueñas. In its basin the Camporredondo reservoir and the reservoir of Compuerto have been built. Despite its 179 km length, the river's entire route is inside the province of Palencia.

== Gallery ==
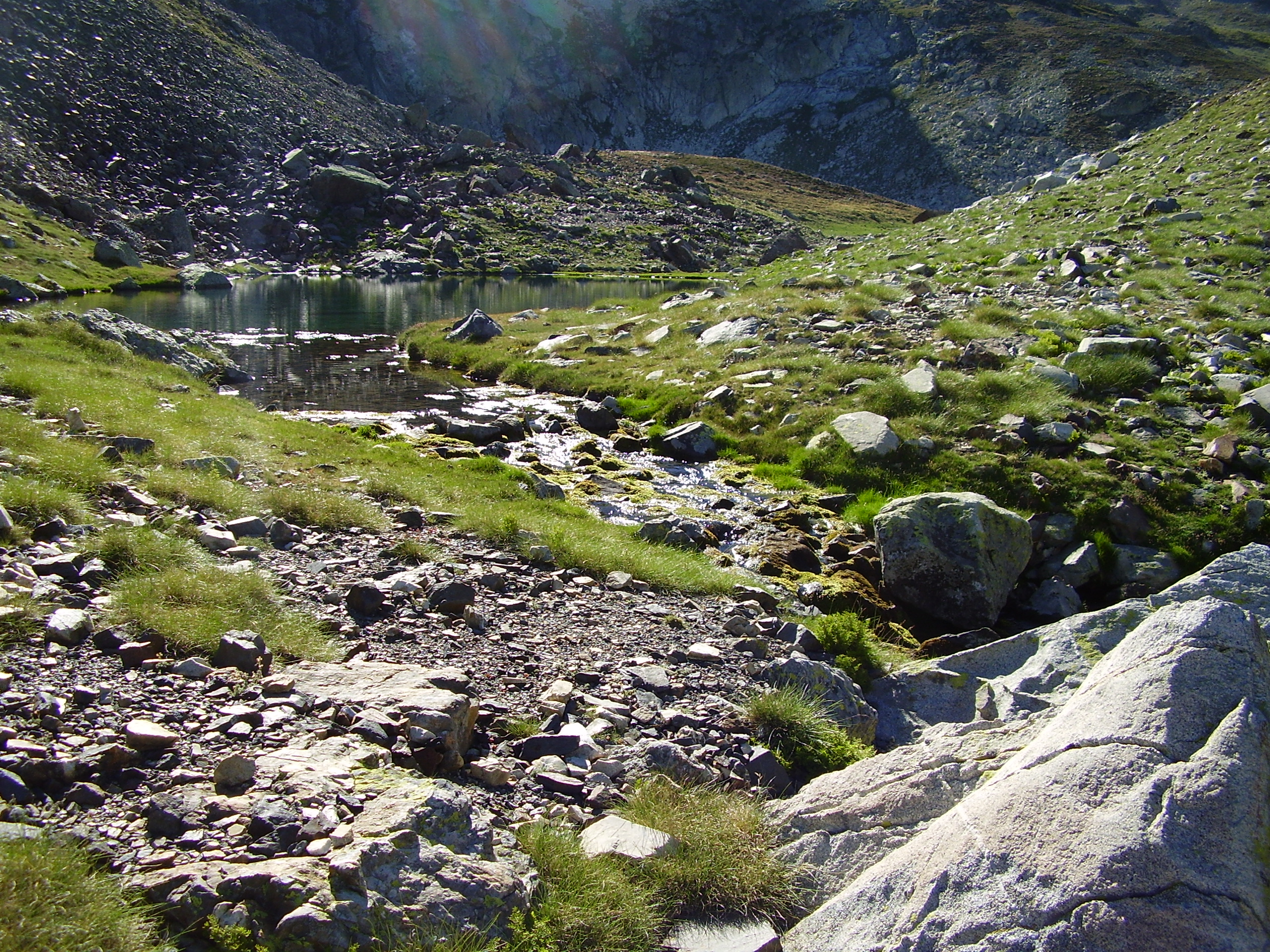
The start of the Carrión River, descending from the Fuentes Carrionas lagoon.

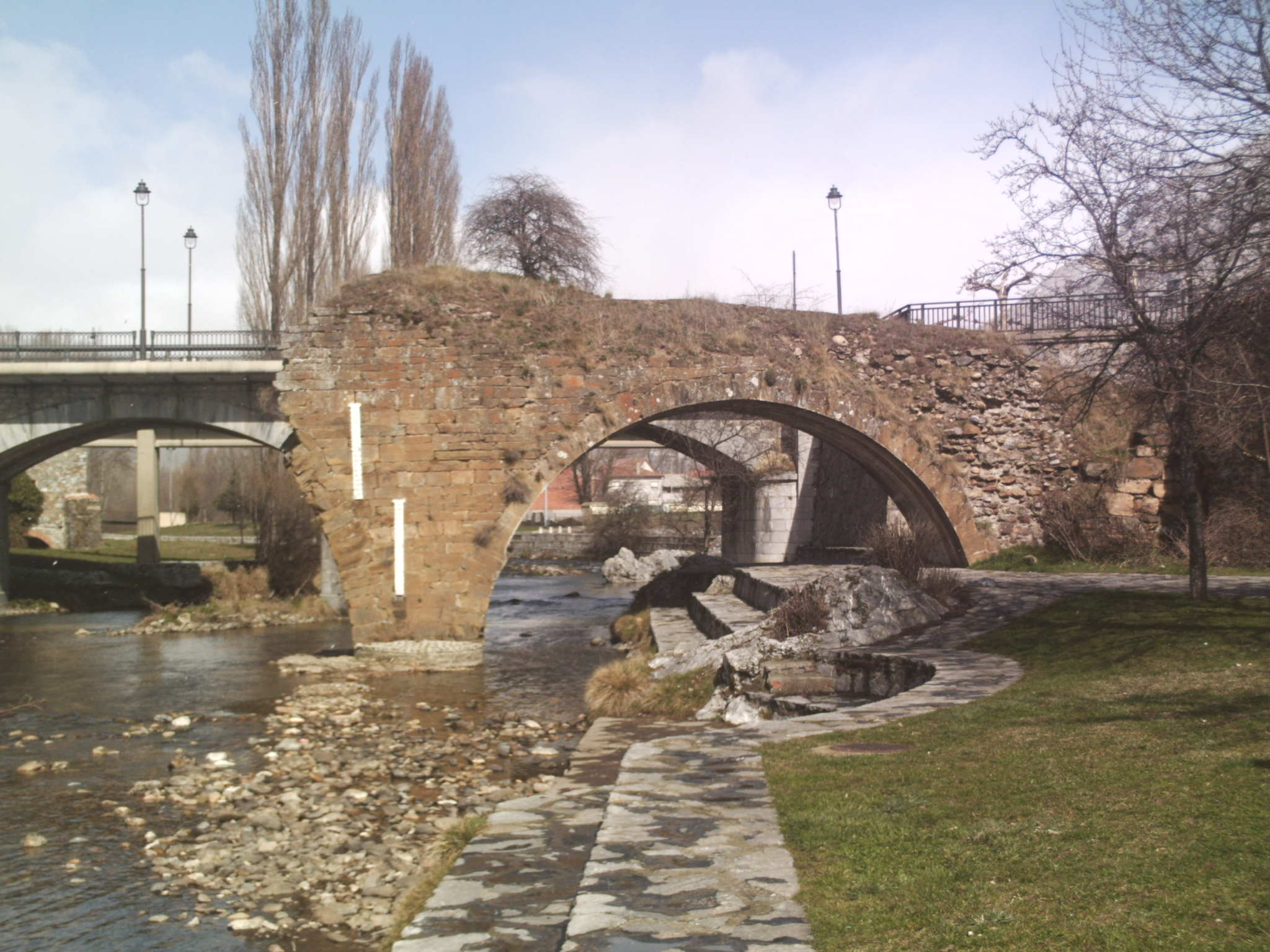
Carrión as it passes through the Roman bridge Velilla, with a modern bridge in the background.

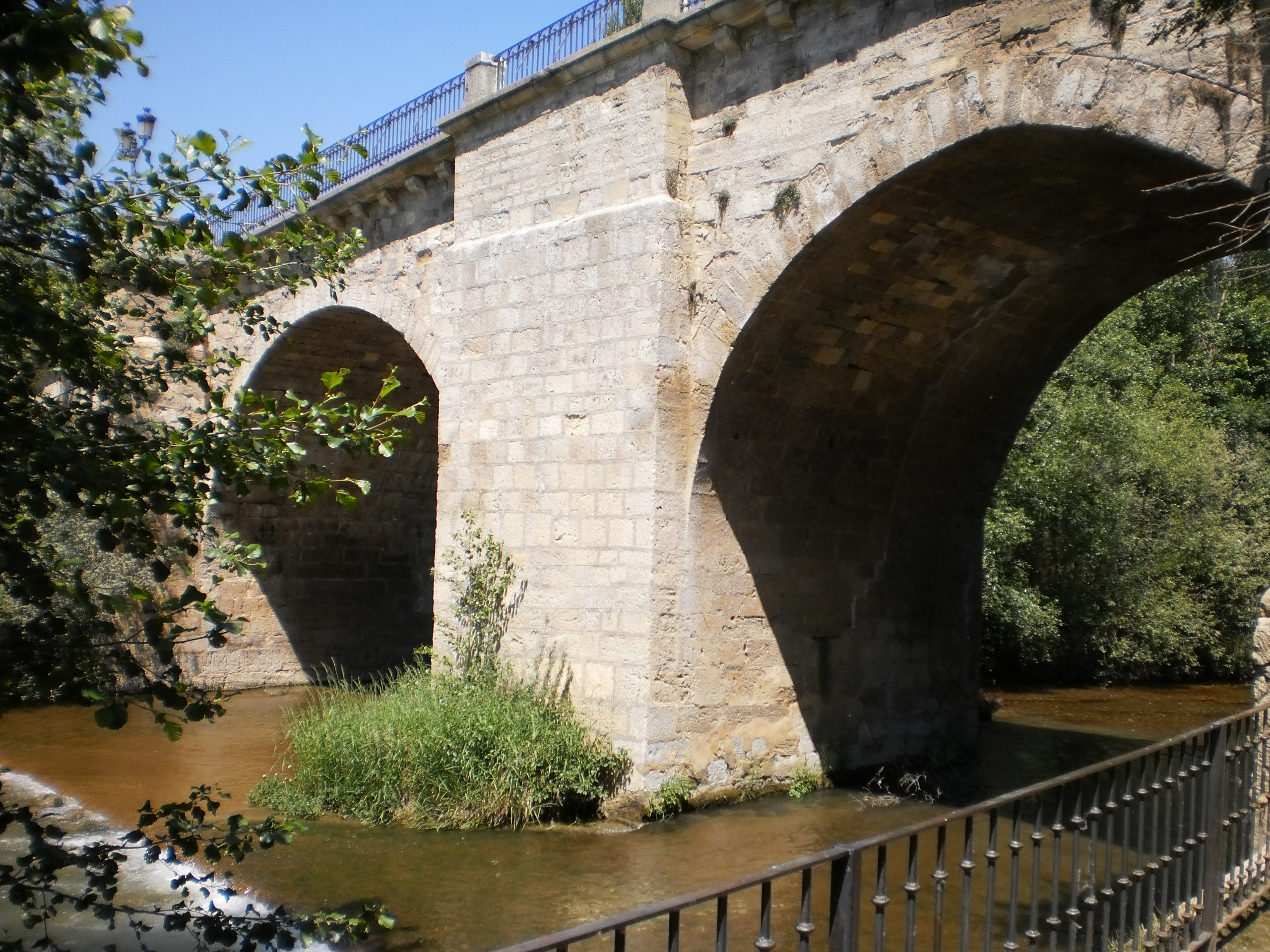
The river on its way under the Carrión de los Condes bridge.

== See also ==
- List of rivers of Spain
- Velilla del Río Carrión
