= Capdepera =

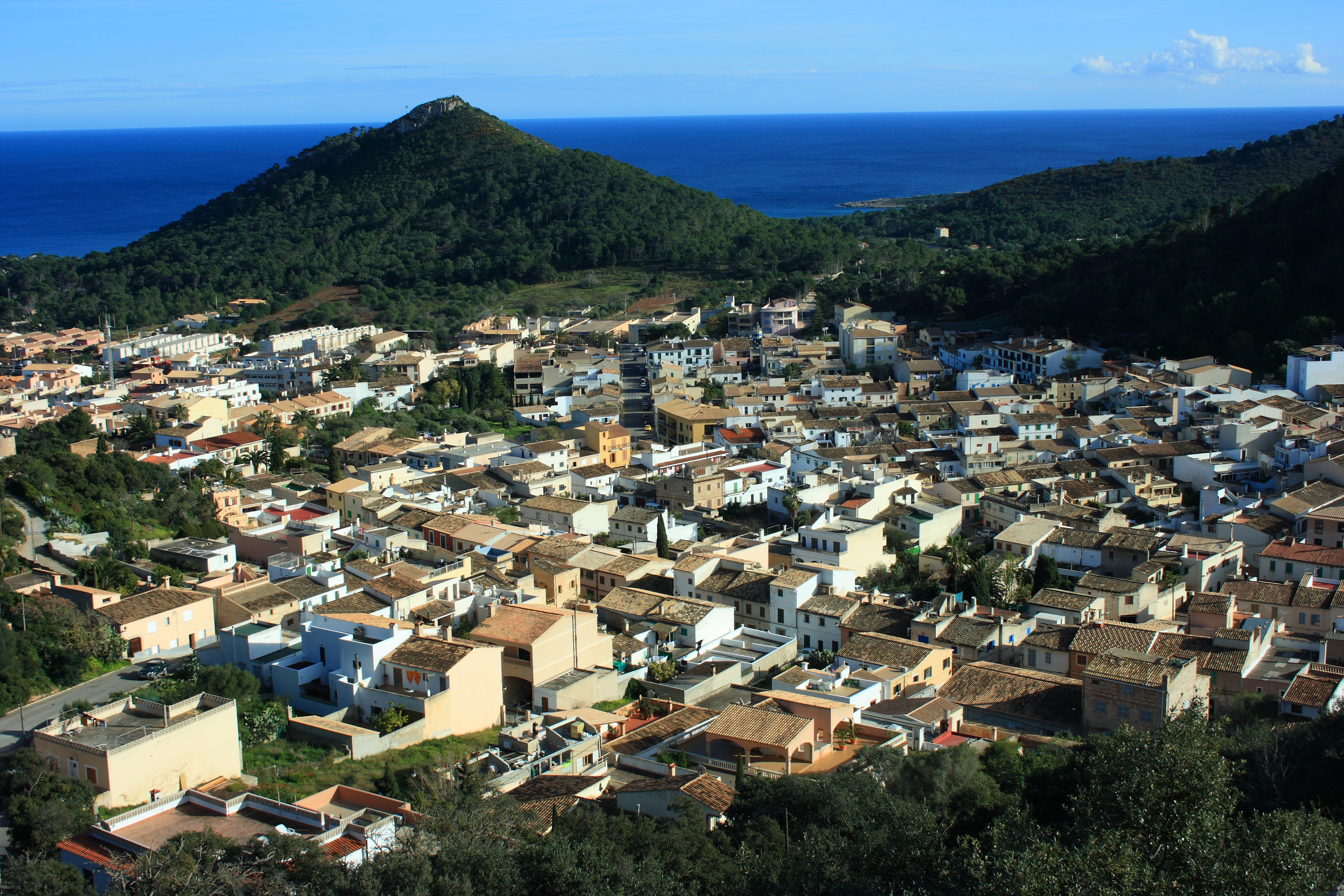

- Coat of arms

- Location of Capdepera in Mallorca

- Location in Spain Capdepera (Balearic Islands) Capdepera (Spain)
- Coordinates: 39°42′N 3°25′E
- Country: Spain
- Autonomous community: Balearic Islands
- Province: Balearic Islands
- Comarca: Llevant

Area
  - Total: 54.92 km^{2} (21.20 sq mi)
- Elevation: 111 m (364 ft)

Population (2025-01-01)
  - Total: 13,135
  - Density: 239.2/km^{2} (619.4/sq mi)
- Time zone: UTC+1 (CET)
  - Summer (DST): UTC+2 (CEST)
- Postal code: 07580
- Website: Official website

Capdepera (Standard Catalan: [ˌkabdəˈpeɾə], Balearic Catalan: [ˌcadːəˈpeɾə]) is a small municipality on Mallorca, one of the Balearic Islands, Spain.

Capdepera is a historical village just 8 km from Artà. Originally there had been a watchtower where the Castle of Capdepera stands today which was used to guard the coast. In 1300 James II of Aragon ordered the construction of a fortified village which would control the uninhabited land below and the maritime routes with Mallorca.

For centuries the village survived behind its walls protected from pirate attacks. As the danger of such attacks disappeared residents of the walled town started to relocate themselves at the bottom of the 162m hill which led to the development of modern-day Capdepera. The better known town of nearby Cala Ratjada actually developed as the fishing and trading port of Capdepera and to this day operates a ferry service with neighbouring Menorca.

As of 2017 many German expatriates reside in Capdepera. From 2016 to 2017 the foreign population in the commune declined by 240.

== Climate ==
Capdepera has a hot semi-arid climate (Köppen climate classification: BSh) with mild winters and hot, dry moderately muggy summers. Autumn is the wettest season of the year, due to the cold drop episodes. During the summer, tropical nights are common and humidity tends to be high, making the nights more muggy and sticky.

Climate data for Capdepera (1991–2020), extremes (1989-present)
Month	Jan	Feb	Mar	Apr	May	Jun	Jul	Aug	Sep	Oct	Nov	Dec	Year
Record high °C (°F)	25.9 (78.6)	25.7 (78.3)	27.4 (81.3)	28.7 (83.7)	36.8 (98.2)	36.2 (97.2)	37.0 (98.6)	38.9 (102.0)	35.6 (96.1)	33.6 (92.5)	28.5 (83.3)	26.6 (79.9)	38.9 (102.0)
Mean daily maximum °C (°F)	15.7 (60.3)	15.2 (59.4)	16.7 (62.1)	18.7 (65.7)	21.6 (70.9)	25.4 (77.7)	28.5 (83.3)	29.4 (84.9)	26.8 (80.2)	23.5 (74.3)	19.3 (66.7)	17.0 (62.6)	21.5 (70.7)
Daily mean °C (°F)	13.1 (55.6)	12.4 (54.3)	13.8 (56.8)	15.8 (60.4)	18.7 (65.7)	22.4 (72.3)	25.5 (77.9)	26.4 (79.5)	23.9 (75.0)	20.7 (69.3)	16.6 (61.9)	14.3 (57.7)	18.6 (65.5)
Mean daily minimum °C (°F)	10.4 (50.7)	9.7 (49.5)	11.0 (51.8)	12.9 (55.2)	15.8 (60.4)	19.4 (66.9)	22.5 (72.5)	23.4 (74.1)	21.0 (69.8)	17.9 (64.2)	13.8 (56.8)	11.7 (53.1)	15.8 (60.4)
Record low °C (°F)	1.2 (34.2)	0.5 (32.9)	1.5 (34.7)	5.5 (41.9)	8.4 (47.1)	12.5 (54.5)	15.9 (60.6)	15.2 (59.4)	12.0 (53.6)	9.5 (49.1)	5.2 (41.4)	2.3 (36.1)	0.5 (32.9)
Average precipitation mm (inches)	35.8 (1.41)	42.9 (1.69)	29.3 (1.15)	26.0 (1.02)	21.6 (0.85)	13.2 (0.52)	4.2 (0.17)	11.8 (0.46)	54.8 (2.16)	49.8 (1.96)	71.2 (2.80)	37.3 (1.47)	397.9 (15.66)
Source: Agencia Estatal de Meteorologia

== See also ==
- List of municipalities in Balearic Islands

== Related articles ==
- Puig des Racó
