= Pic de Costa Cabirolera =

Mountain in Spain

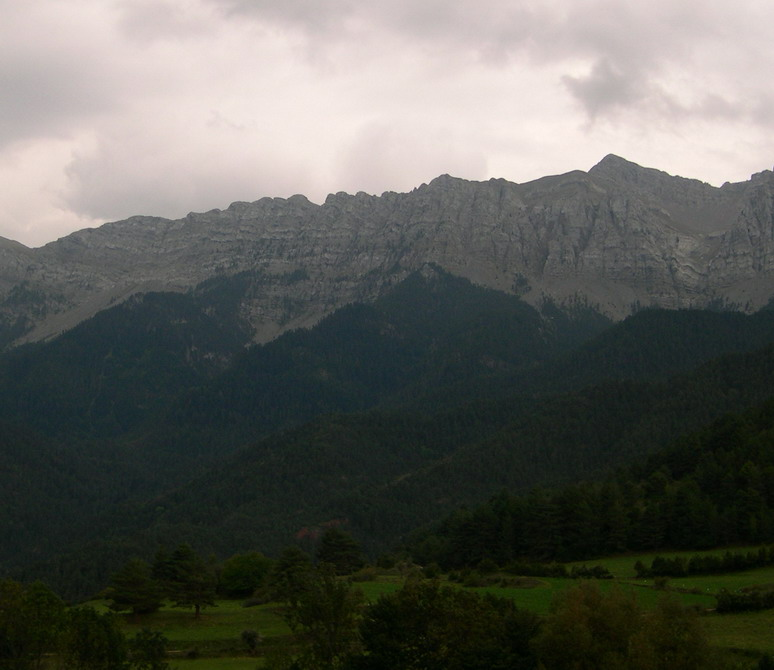

Highest point
- Elevation: 2,604 m (8,543 ft)
- Listing: List of mountains in Catalonia
- Coordinates: 42°16′53″N 1°40′14″E

Geography
- Location within Catalonia
- Location: Catalonia, Spain

Pic de Costa Cabirolera is a mountain of Catalonia, Spain. It has an elevation of 2,604 metres (8,543 ft) above sea level.
