= Veleta (Sierra Nevada) =

Mountain in Granada, Spain

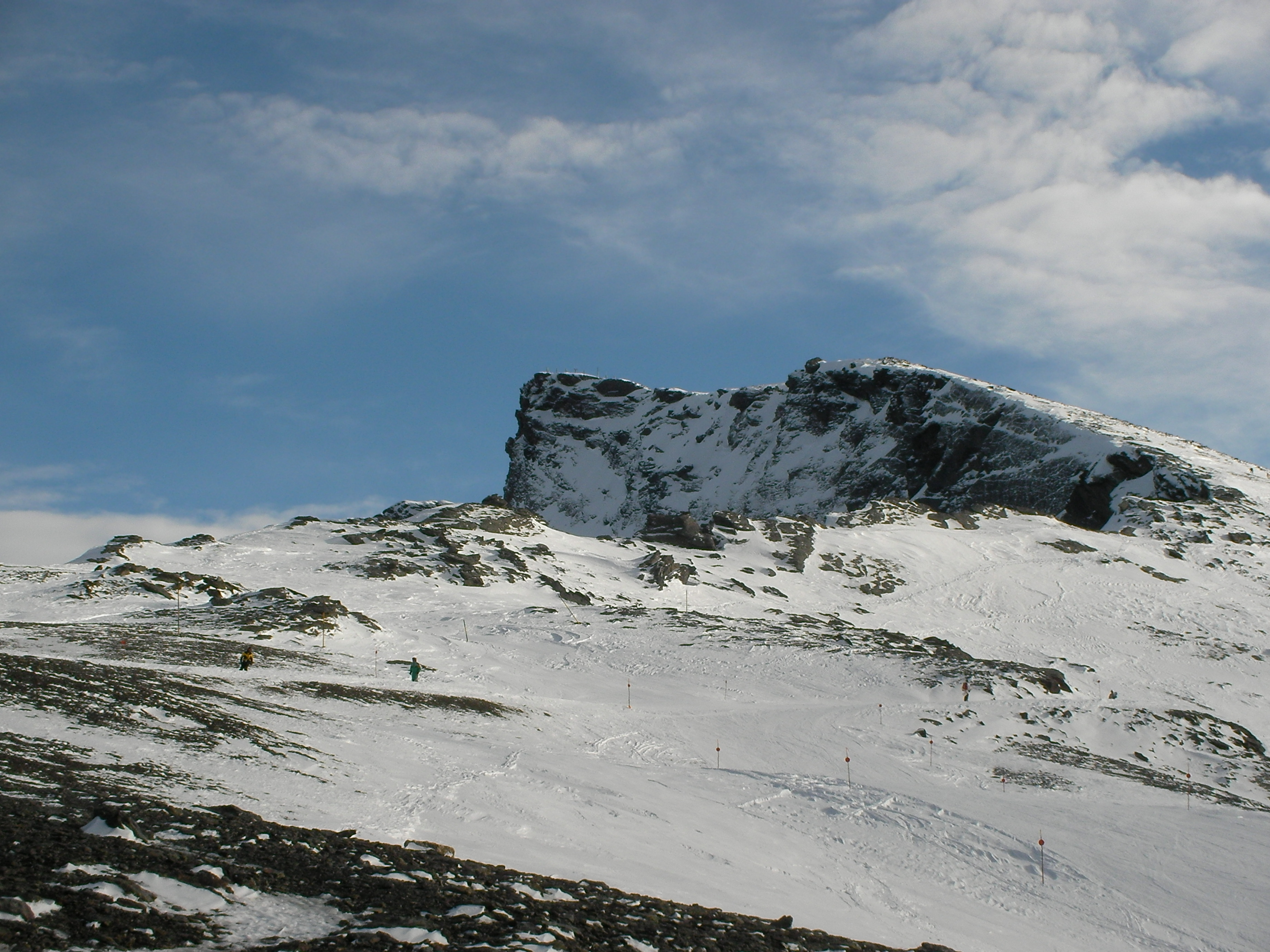
- The summit of Veleta

Highest point
- Elevation: 3,394 m (11,135 ft); 3,396 m (11,142 ft); 3,398 m (11,148 ft)
- Coordinates: 37°3′24″N 3°21′57″W

Geography
- Location within Province of Granada Location within Andalusia Location within Spain
- Location: Province of Granada, Andalucia, Spain
- Parent range: Sierra Nevada

Climbing
- Easiest route: From Granada

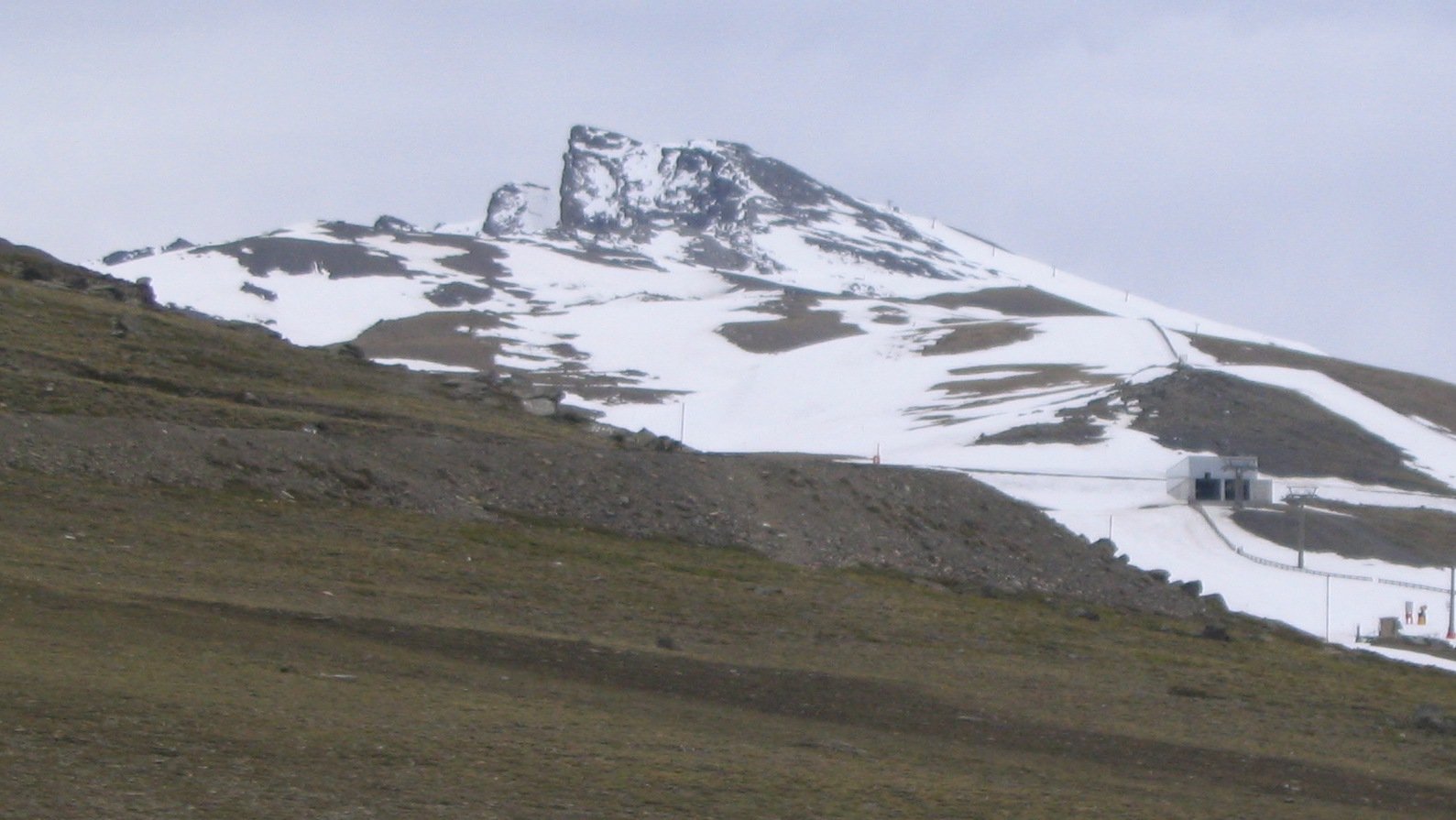
The mountain and ski area

Veleta (from the Arab word "Balata", meaning cliff) or Pico del Veleta is the third highest peak of the Iberian Peninsula and the second highest of the Sierra Nevada. Its height is given variously as 3,394 metres (11,135 ft), 3,396 metres (11,142 ft) and 3,398 metres (11,148 ft).

The mountain can be seen from the city of Granada. Veleta's northern slopes are home to the Sierra Nevada Ski Station. The access road that takes one to approximately 10 metres below the summit is the highest paved road in Europe across the mountains from Granada to the western Alpujarras. This road was built before the creation of the Sierra Nevada National Park in 1999. It has since been closed to general traffic beyond Hoya de la Mora, just above the ski station. However, the road is still used by ski station employees, national park rangers, observatory staff, cyclists and walkers, and by a microbus service which takes hikers up to Posiciones del Veleta, a viewpoint 3,100 metres above sea level. In summer it is a relatively easy walk up to the summit from there.

The Corral de la Veleta or Corral del Veleta glacier, at 37° N the southernmost glacier in Europe, disappeared in 1913.

The IRAM 30m telescope is located on the slopes of Pico Veleta, at an elevation of 2920 m.

== See also ==
- Sierra Nevada Ski Station
- List of highest paved roads in Europe
- List of highest paved roads in Europe by country
- List of mountain passes
