= Autovía A-10 =

Spanish motorway in Navarra

Autovía A-10
- Sakanako Autobia
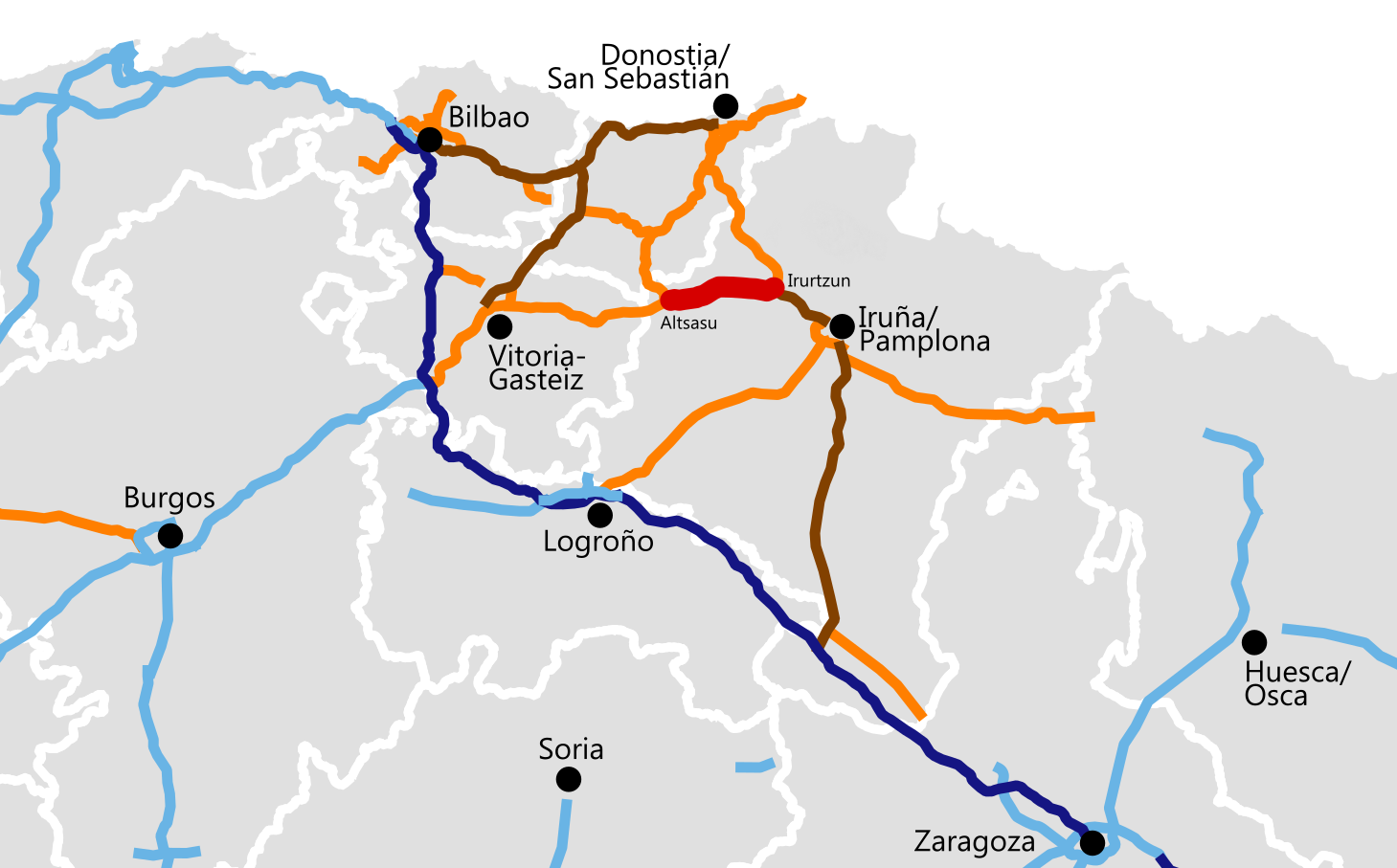

Route information
- Length: 29 km (18 mi)

Major junctions
- From: Irurtzun
- To: Altsasu

Location
- Country: Spain

Highway system
- Highways in Spain; Autopistas and autovías; National Roads

The autovía A-10 (also known as Sakanako Autobia in Basque) is an motorway in Navarre. It is 29 kilometres (18 mi) long and runs from the Autovía A-15 at Irurtzun to the Autovía A-1 at Altsasu. Built between 1992 and 1995 as an upgrade of the N-240 road, it received the A-10 designation in 2003 as part of the general renumbering of Spanish autovías.

== Sections ==
Route name	Section	Length	Opening
	Irurtzun – Irañeta	8.3 kilometres (5.2 mi)	1993
	Irañeta – Lakuntza	6.6 kilometres (4.1 mi)	1993
	Lakuntza – Etxarri-Aranatz	3.7 kilometres (2.3 mi)	1995
	Etxarri-Aranatz – Altsasu	9.5 kilometres (5.9 mi)	1996

== Exits ==
Maximum speed (km/h)	Exit	Irurtzun → Altsasu	Altsasu → Irurtzun	Connexion
		Beginning of SAKANAKO AUTOBIA	End of SAKANAKO AUTOBIA → Iruña/Pamplona	
			Irurtzun · Donostia · Baiona	
	2–3	Etxarren · Ekai · Zuhatzu		
	4	Satrustegi · Hiriberri Arakil		
	5	Hiriberri Arakil Service area		
	7	Ihabar		
	9	Irañeta		
	11	Uharte-Arakil		
	12	Uharte-Arakil · Zamartze		
	13–14	Arruazu		
	14	Lakuntza Service area		
	15–16	Lakuntza		
	17–18	Arbizu		
	19–20	Etxarri-Aranatz · Beasain · Lizarra/Estella · Andia		
	21	Etxarri-Aranatz · Bakaiku		
	24	Bakaiku · Iturmendi		
	26	Urdiain		
	28	Altsasu		
	29	Donostia		
	29	Olazti · Urbasa		
	29	End of SAKANAKO AUTOBIA → Vitoria-Gasteiz · Bilbao	Beginning of SAKANAKO AUTOBIA	
