= Ganboa =

Mountain in the Basque Country

Coordinates: 43°00′22.28″N 2°03′45.80″W

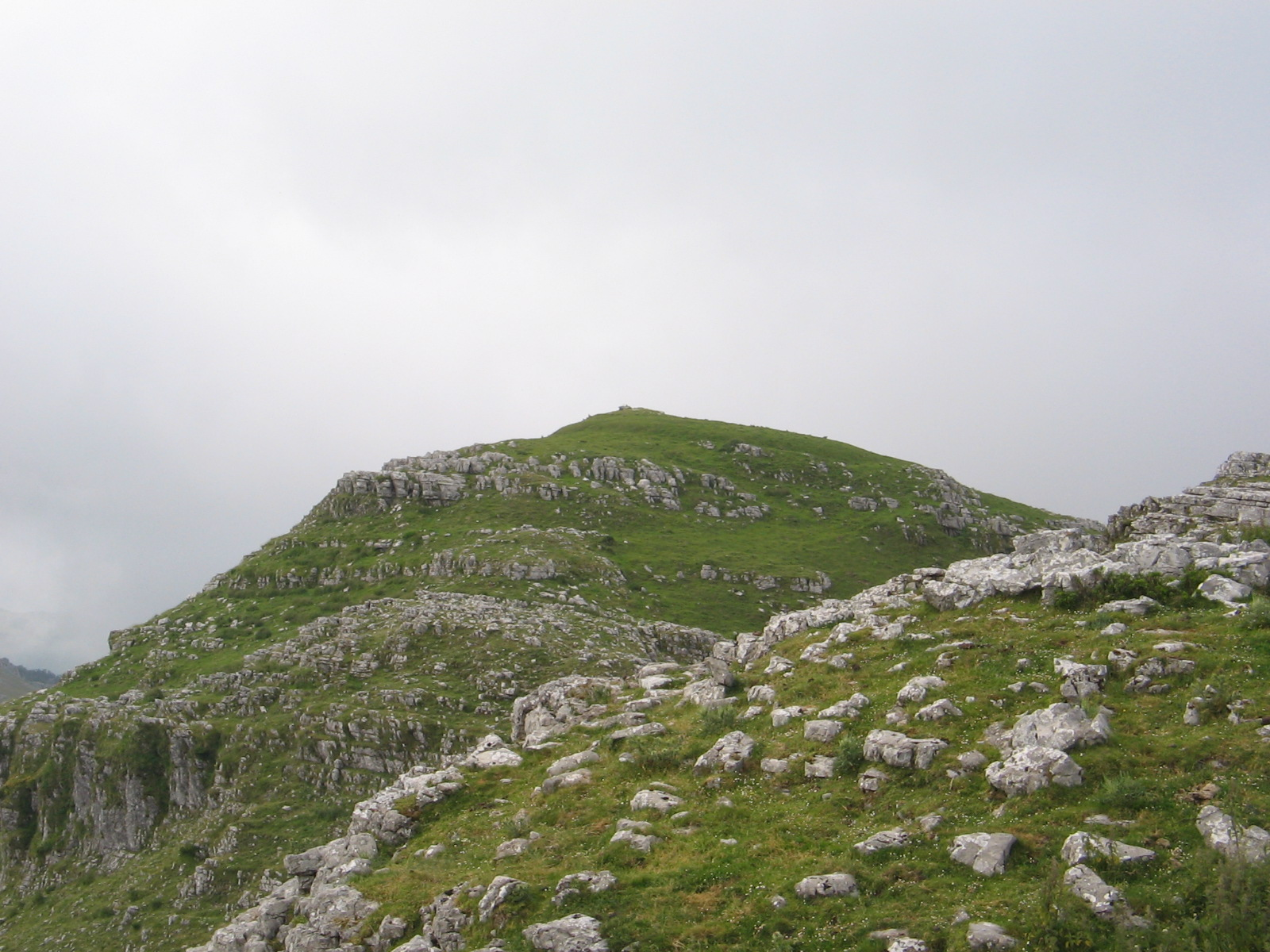
- Mount Ganboa close-up from the north

Highest point
- Elevation: 1,412 m (4,633 ft)

Naming
- Language of name: Basque
- Pronunciation: Basque: [ɡanˈbo.a]

Geography
- Location: Gipuzkoa, Spain
- Parent range: Basque Mountains, Aralar

Climbing
- Easiest route: From Larraitz, Altunegi (Amezketa) or the Guardetxe

Ganboa (1,412 m) is a summit on the Gipuzkoan side of the Aralar Range (Basque Country), the mount having long been held as the highest in the range, while nowadays it trails second to Irumugarrieta. The peak, crowned with a mountaineer postbox, is surrounded by grasslands, secondary peaks and limestone karst terrain, where deep fissures are not rare to be seen.

== Access points ==
Ganboa's central position at the heart of Aralar sets the summit far away and at a similar distance from any access point.

- One route sets out in Larraitz following the classical beaten trail leading to Txindoki. After the zigzags ensuing the spring Oria (860 m high), a trail detaches to the right gradually ascending on the slopes of Aralar's highlands till the gentle fields of Alotza (1,182 m) are reached. The pastures provide the grass for the cattle in summertime (largely horses, sheep and cows), so drinking troughs, springs and sheep pens are easily found on the way. On arrival to the pass of Irazusta (1250 m), the main trail heading to the Igaratza plains must be left on the right, and a small valley lacking any noticeable path slopes up north-east to Ganboa. 2h30 hours walk and back.
- Another one, the "Quarry Route", starts off at the neighbourhood Altunegi of Amezketa, while a vehicle ride through a paved road leads to the very threshold of the valley of the quarries (Minak, 450 m high). After walking across the forest, the trail penetrates into a deep valley along the stream Arritzaga with fields all along. As the valley turns shallower, at the drinking trough of Pardeluts (1050 m), a valley going south-west must be taken in order to gain height up to the peak, on the right hand. 2h45 and back.
- The access from the Navarrese side at the Guardetxe or Ranger Shelter is less demanding as regards the altitude difference, since the Guardetxe stands at 1,035 m high, while the hiking distance remains long. The route heads north-west through a beaten trail, with the shelters of Errenaga (1,220 m) and the Igaratza plains lying halfway to Ganboa. Igaratza houses a megalithic site, with interesting stone circles, dolmens and a menhir. Taking the way left cutting across the southern side of the bulk Pardarri, the trail reaches the pass of Irazusta.

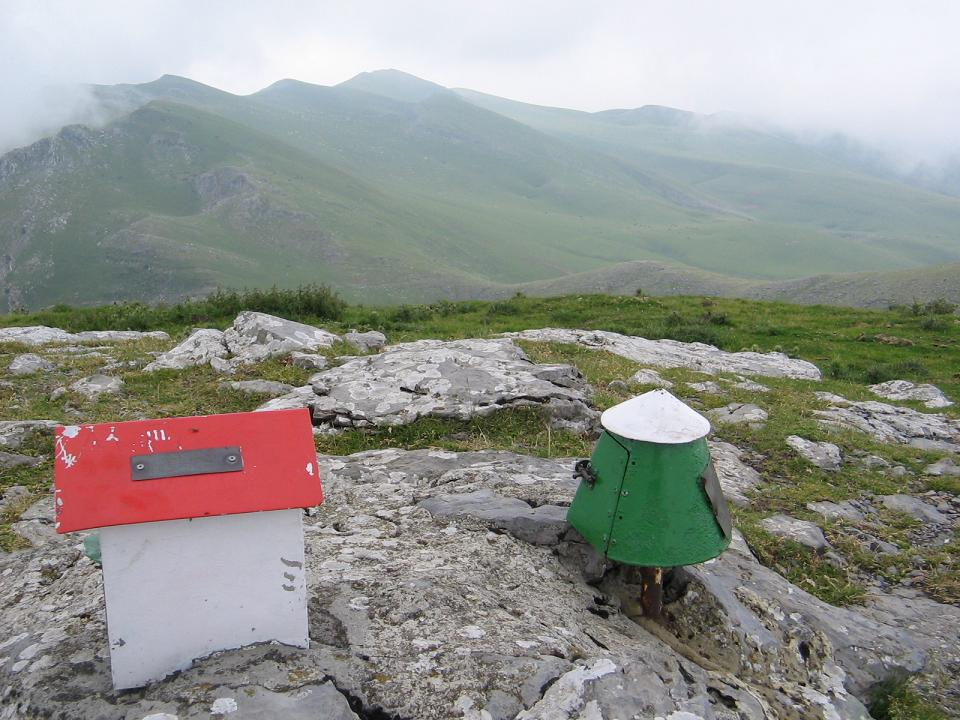
Summit of Ganboa with Uarrain and the Alotza fields on the background
