= Aralar Range =

Range of the Basque Mountains

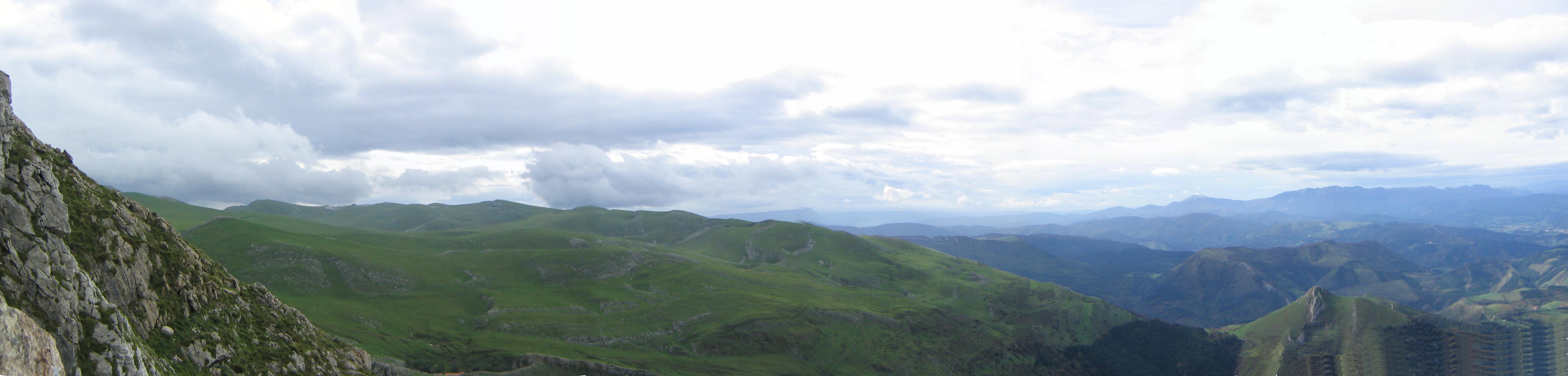
- View of the Aralar mountains from Txindoki

Highest point
- Peak: Irumugarrieta
- Elevation: 1,431 m (4,695 ft)

Dimensions
- Area: 208 km^{2} (80 mi^{2})

Geography
- Country: Spain
- Provinces: Gipuzkoa and Navarre
- Range coordinates: 43°00′00″N 2°02′00″W

Geology
- Rock type: Karst

The Aralar Range (Basque pronunciation: [aˈɾalar]) is a mountain range in the Basque Mountains of the Southern Basque Country. The part of the range lying in Gipuzkoa was established as a conservation area called Aralar Natural Park in 1994. In addition to its natural features, scenery, recreational use and habitation, the range is home to a number of Basque mythology milestones and legends.

== Etymology ==
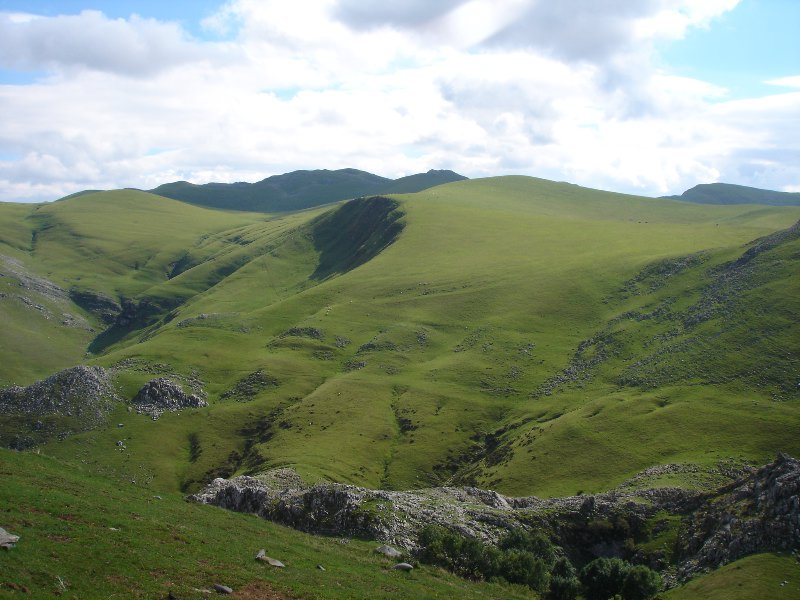
The Aralar fields from Txindoki

The Basque word, 'Aralar' may stem from the words '(h)aran', meaning 'valley' and 'larre', meaning 'graze-land'. In Spanish, the range is also called Sierra de Aralar.

== Location ==
The range covers 20,800 hectares (208 km^{2}). 10,971 hectares (109.71 km^{2}) is conservation area. The range is located in the Basque Country of northern Spain, straddling the boundaries of south-eastern Gipuzkoa and north-western Navarre. The range effectively separates the two provinces. Pamplona lies approximately 40 kilometres (25 mi) to the south east. The Spanish coastline at the Cantabrian Sea (the southern Bay of Biscay) and the town of San Sebastian are approximately the same distance to the north north-east. The border between Spain and France is approximately 50 kilometres (31 mi) to the north-east. Villages located at the foot of the range include Beasain, Arbizu and Ataun. At Lizarrusti, a visitor centre marks the park's main entrance. It operates in the former miquelete (Gipuzkoan military police) barracks. The Aia hamlet (access via Aia road, NA120) nestles on the southern slopes of the range.

== Geography ==
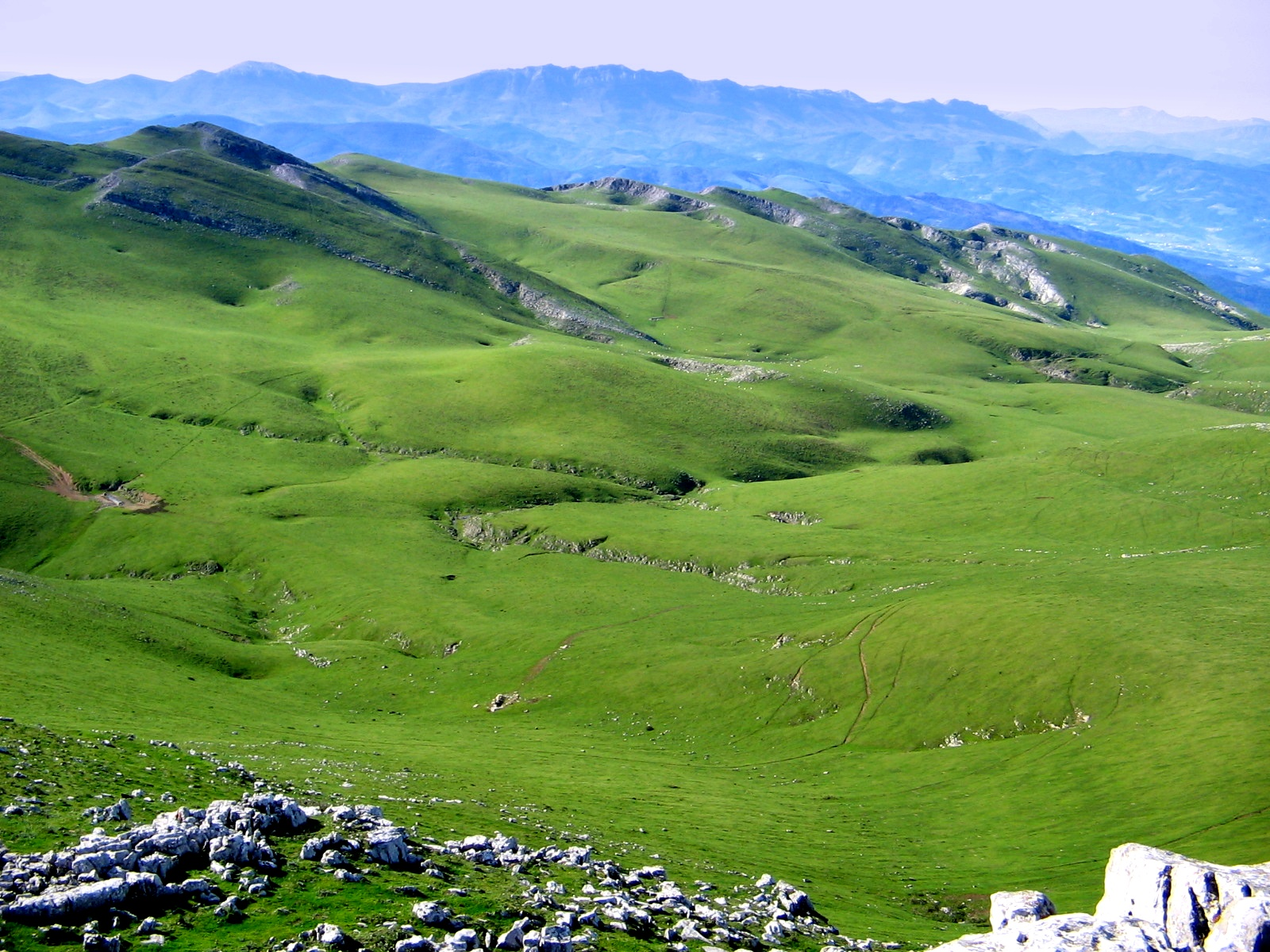
Alotza meadows and Aizkorri in the background

The range is mountainous with large limestone massifs (formations resulting from movement of the Earth's crust into faults and flexures). This is typical of the Basque region. The range has a karstic lithological appearance, i.e. parts of the calcareous (calcium carbonate, limestone) rock outcrops have been dissolved away in water. Left behind are limestone pavements—areas where the limestone has formed etched, pitted or fluted rock pinnacles and ridges between which are deep grooves, sinkholes or dolinas, caves, underground rivers, and gullies. An example, now open to the public, is the cavern of Mendukillo in the village of Astitz. This cracked, permeable geologic milieu has provided the perfect grounds for a wide range of mythological accounts and characters.

=== Geology ===
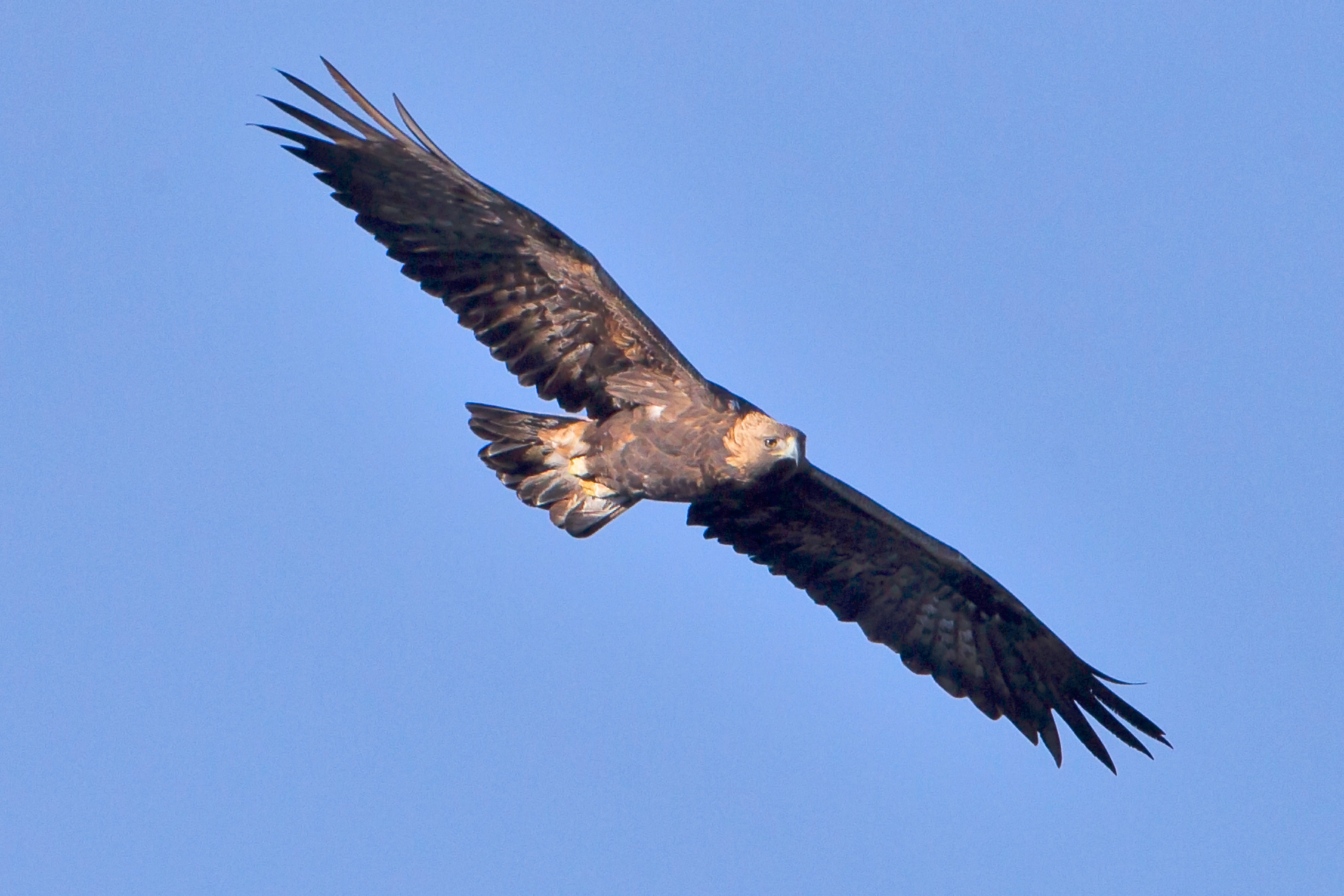
Golden eagle

The materials that dominate are clay, marl, sandstone and limestone. Except for quaternary period coatings, all the materials are from the Jurassic and Cretaceous eras. The original limestone reefs create the element of ruggedness of the range. Two examples are the Txindoki relief and the Ataun dome structure. Sandstone is found to the north and south of the range. Glaciated areas with small frontal moraines at one to two km from the cirque have been found.

=== Water sources ===
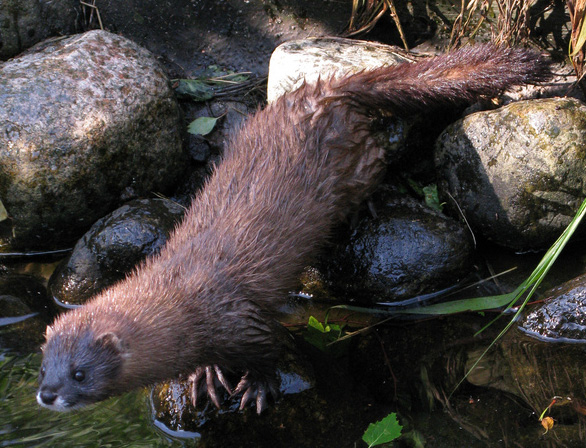
European mink

Many streams originate in the range. Between the peaks, there are four large basins: Agauntza, Zaldibia, Ibiur and Amezketa in which streams can form. Due to the Karst geological forms, some waterways are underground. The waterways contribute to the economy of the region, for example, in the production of hydroelectric power.

== Climate ==
The Basque region, generally, has a temperate oceanic climate. The climate of the Aralar range transitions between the Eastern Cantabrian climate of Gipuzkoa and the Continental-Mediterranean climate of the Barranca corridor (Navarre). The mountains, however, do create their own micro-climate with more intense rainfall and greater cloud cover. Mists can make hiking in the park more dangerous.

== History ==
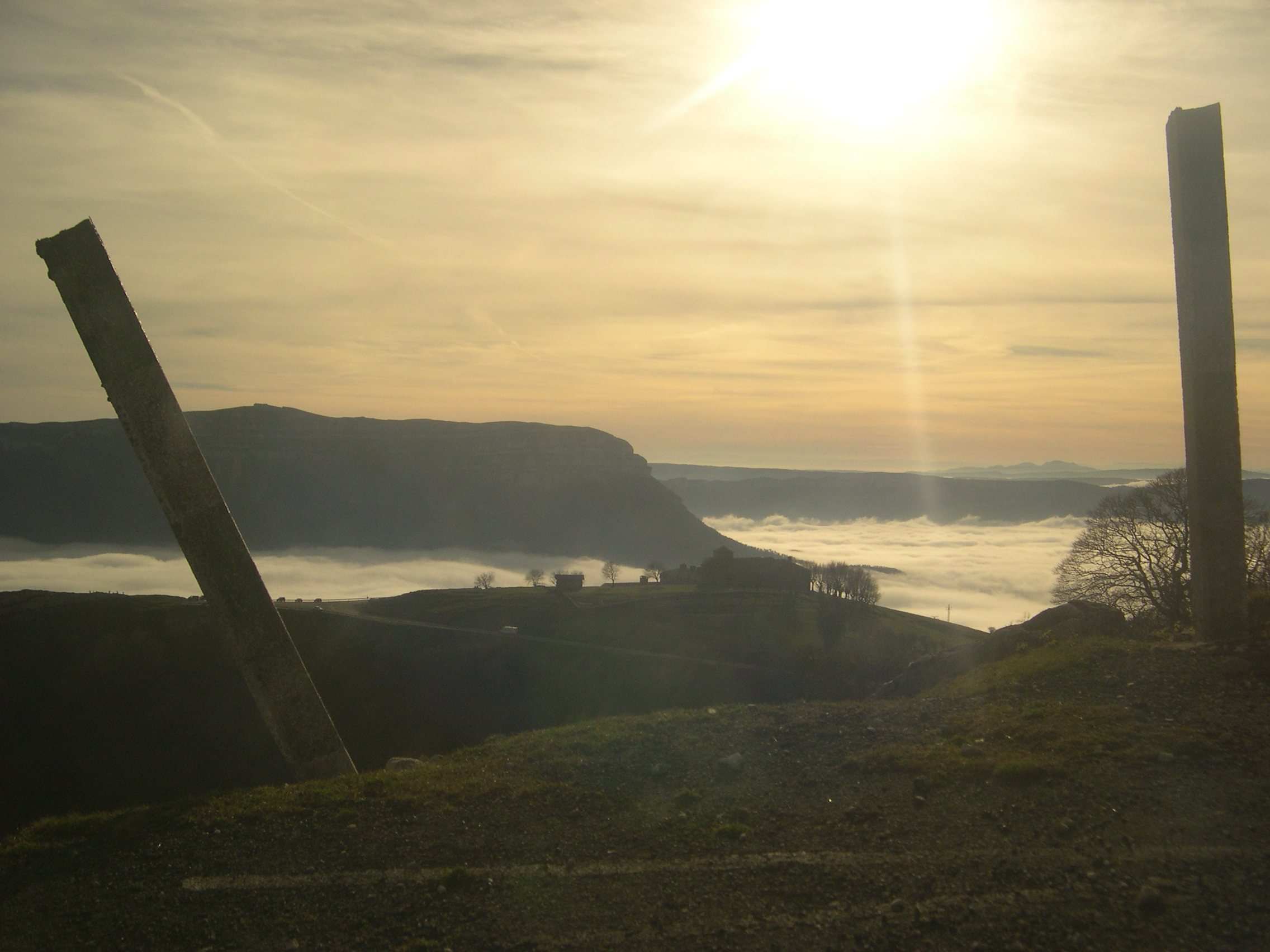
San Miguel Sanctuary, mount Beriain in the background

Megalithic monuments indicate prehistoric habitation of the range. These monuments include tumuli, stone circles and menhirs. There are 17 on the Gipuzkoan side and 44 on the Navarrese side of the range. Archaeological evidence suggests Neolithic pastoralism. For example, primary forests, now restricted to the fringes of the range have been replaced by pastures. Also, a local mythology of legends, folk beliefs and tales, which is dependent on the nature of the landscape has emerged. The ethnographer and historian, José Miguel de Barandiarán, was born in the local town, Ataun.

=== Sanctuary of San Miguel in Excelsis ===
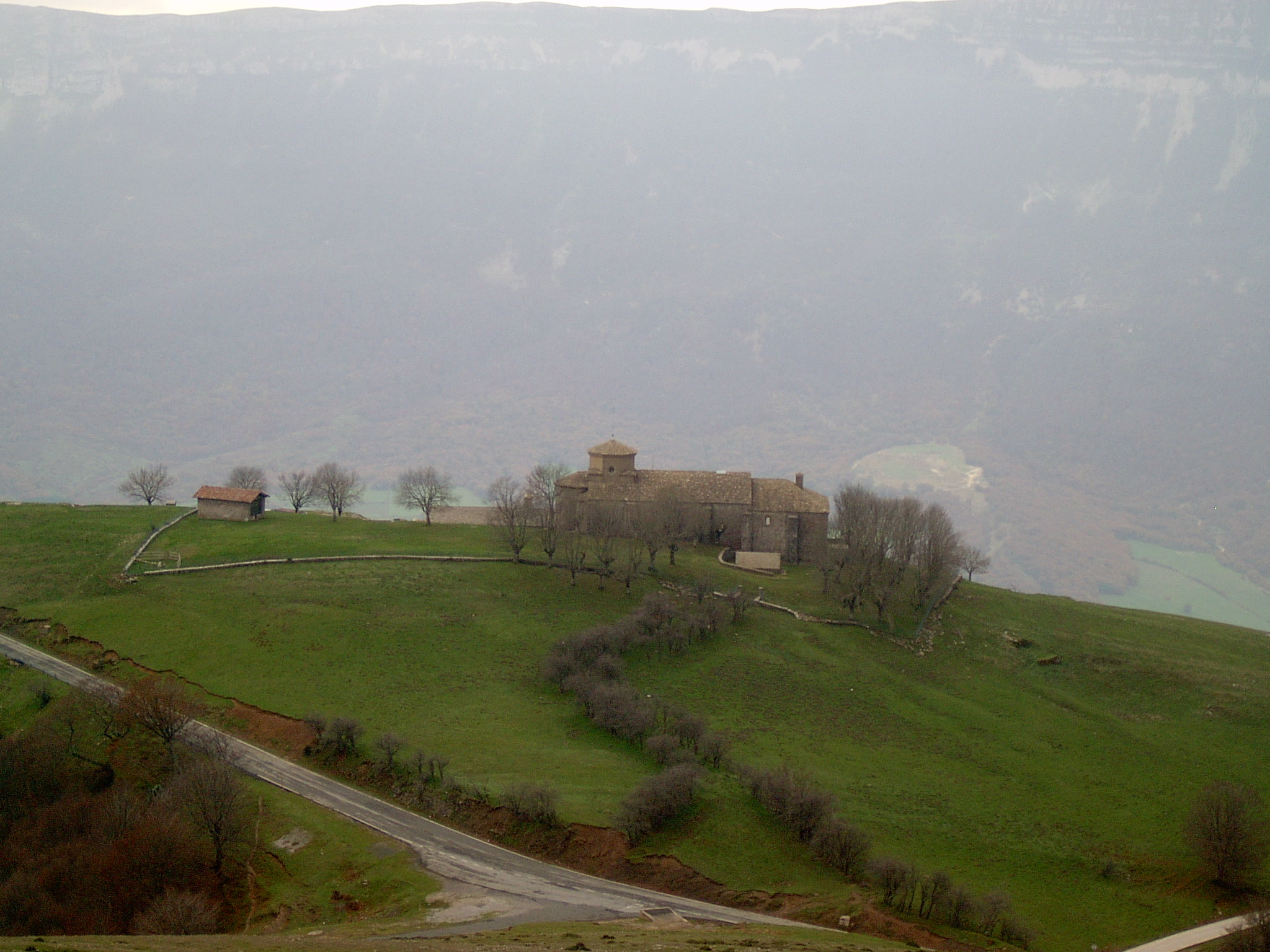
San Miguel de Aralar Sanctuary

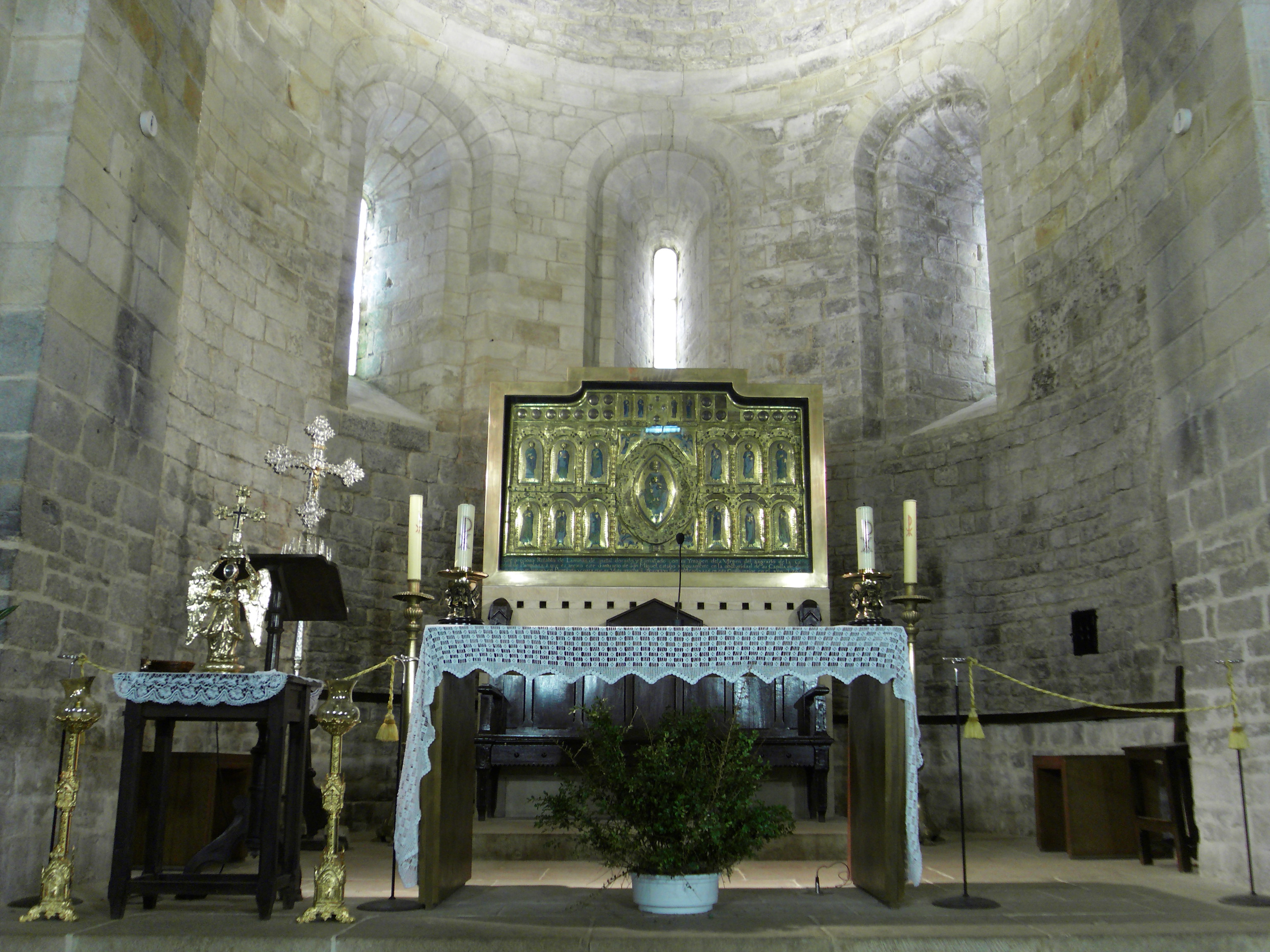
Inside the apse of San Miguel de Aralar

Also called 'Aralarko San Migel Santutegia' and 'Santuario de San Miguel de Aralar' in Spanish, San Miguel is a Romanesque church located in the southern part of the range near the town of Uharte-Arakil and Mount Altxueta (1343m). Records about the church date from the 11th century (1032) and it contributes to the history of Christianity in northern Spain—San Miguel is an iconic and one of the oldest saints of the Basques. The chapel was built by the lord of Goñi and consecrated 1098.

However, there was an earlier 9th-century structure on the same site in the Carolingian style. After a fire in the 10th century, the church was rebuilt with two aisles. The pillars are cruciform (one round). There is a simple fascia and no capitals. The church has three apses at the atrium, three barrel vaulted naves and a central polygonal dome. The altar front, featuring Our Lady, is enamelled. Nearby, in a grotto, there is a 12th-century shrine to San Miguel.

Legend holds that in a case of mistaken identity a crusader knight, the lord Teodosio of Goni, accidentally killed his own parents. In penance, he chained himself alone on Mount Aralar. An apparition dedicated to the archangel Michael appeared and released him. The apparition left an image, a figure with a glass (or crystal) head and face and a helmet adorned with a cross. The image was disfigured by the French in 1797. In the park there is also the Our Lady of Remedios Hermitage.

== Land use ==
=== Hiking, mountaineering and speleology ===
There are a number of trails, landmarks and unique destinations in the ranges. The karst features are suitable for caving.

=== Agriculture ===
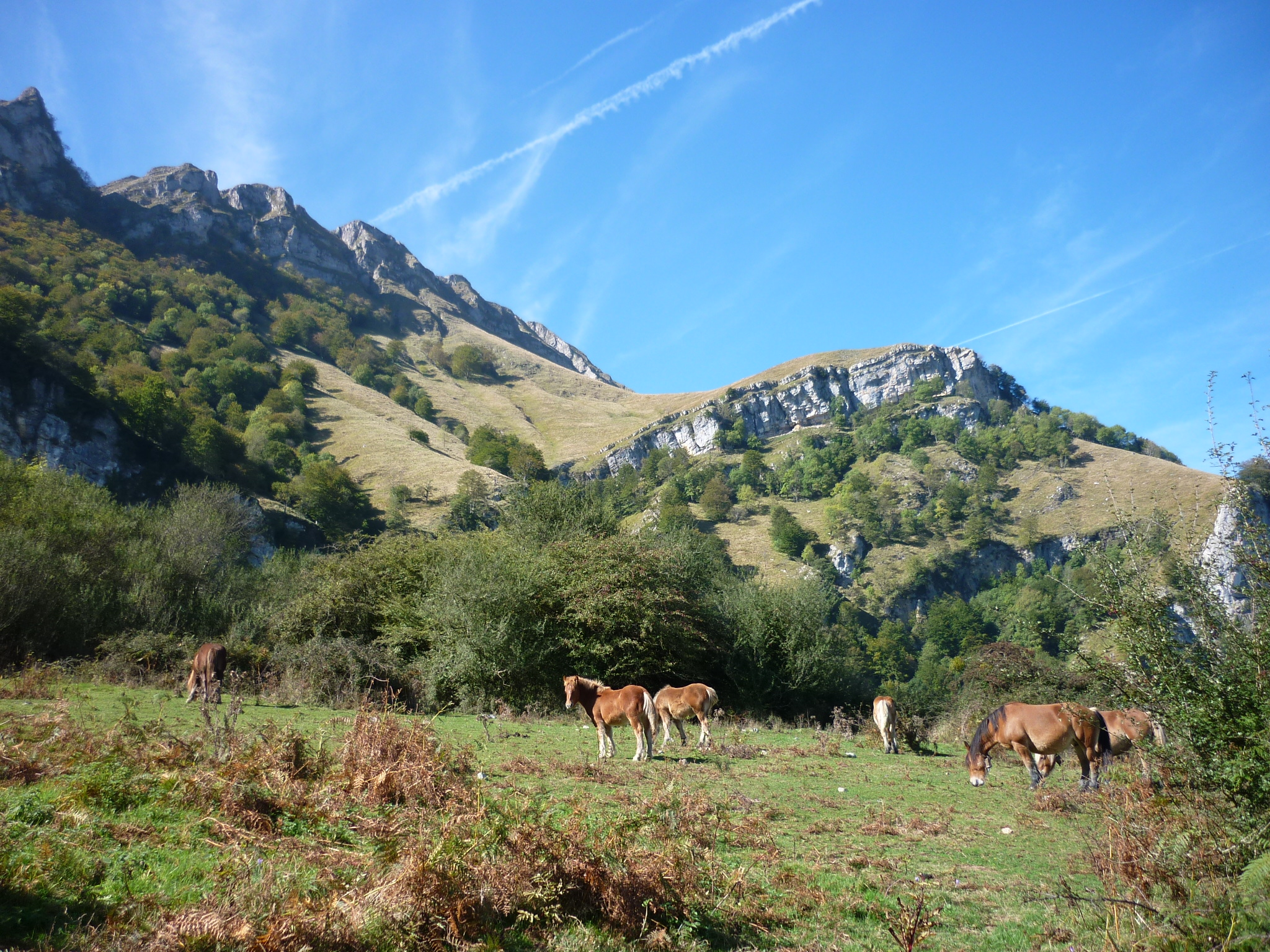
Wild horses of Aralar

Between May and November, livestock, especially latxa sheep which provide the milk for Idiazabal cheese, dairy cattle and a herd of wild horses, graze in the park's public pastures. Although the ranges are generally uninhabited, some people of Aralar follow a nomadic life, tending their animals. Through the summer months, the sheep graze in the higher terrain. Pastoral huts have been built in these areas for shepherds. The animals winter near the villages.

=== Rural communities ===
Approximately 5112 people live in villages in the range; Abaltzisketa (290), Amezketa (1075), Ataun (1822), Zaldibia (1696) and Bedaio (229). They work in agriculture, in industries in larger towns and in tourism.

== Fauna ==
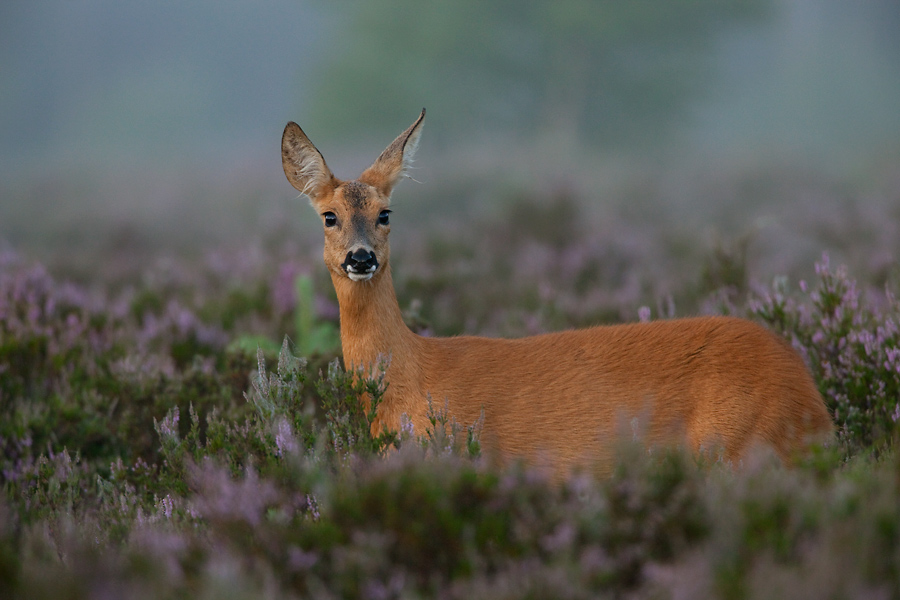
European roe deer

=== Animals ===
Animals of the range include European mink, roe deer, wild boar and various small and medium mammals such as Pyrenean desmans and the European snow voles. There are amphibians such as the alpine newts.

=== Birds ===
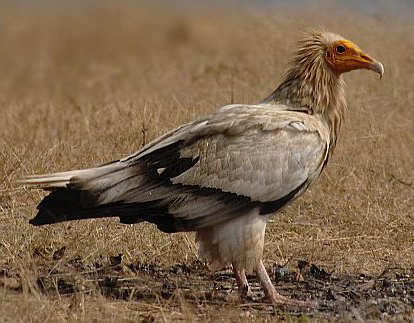
Egyptian vulture

The varieties of birds of the range include griffons, Egyptian vultures, golden eagles, and bearded vultures, Alpine choughs, wood pigeons and black woodpeckers.

== Flora ==
The range is known for its beech forests. In times past, beech pollards have been used to make charcoal. There are also groves of rowan and hawthorne and Cantabrian holm oak.

== Mountains ==
=== Dome of Ataun ===
This plateau feature is created by the peaks of Jentilbaratza, Aizkoate, Aizkorrandi, Arastortz, Agautz, Leizadi, Asundi, Loibideko Mailoak and Ikarandieta.

=== Txindoki ===
Txindoki is the most widely known and visited peak in the range. The peak is called "Little Cervine" and the mountain itself, the 'Basque Matterhorn'.

=== Intzeko Torrea ===
Tower of Intza, also called “Irumugarrieta”, is the highest mountain of the range.

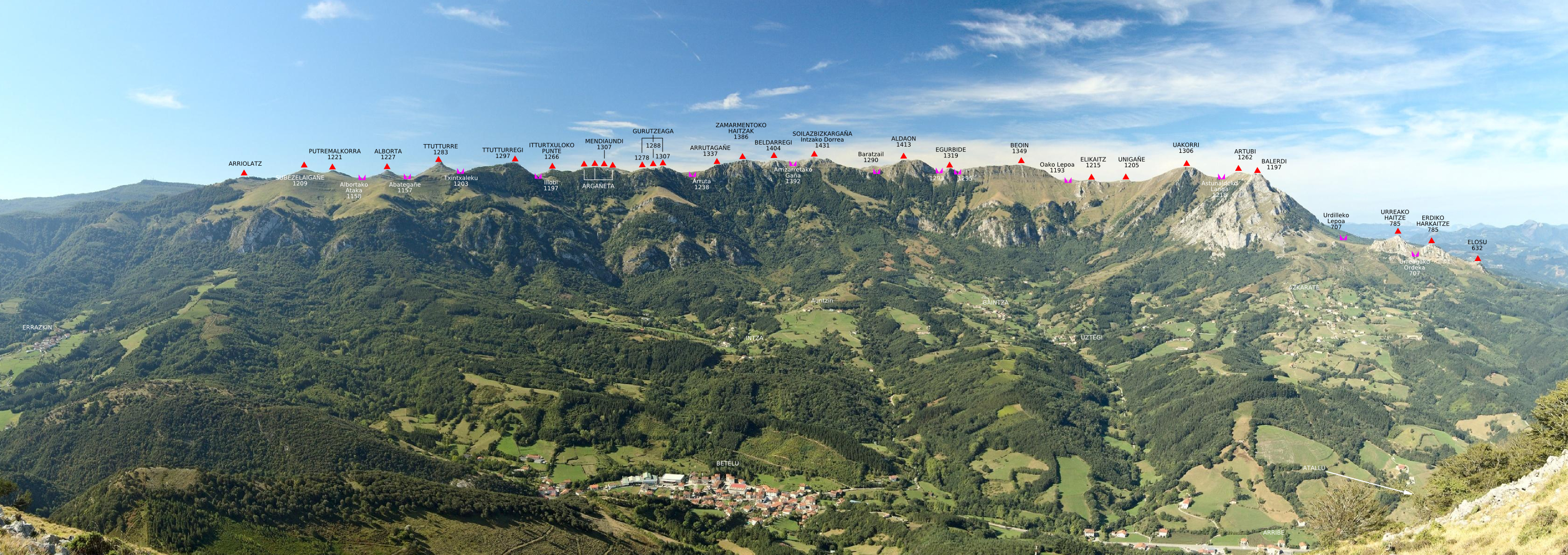
The malloas at the northern face of Aralar

=== Peaks to 800 metres (2,600 ft) ===
- Aizkoate (774 m)
- Artzate Haitza (656 m)
- Aixita (705 m)
- Itaundieta (627 m)
- Madalenaitz (860 m)
- Otsabio (801 m)
- Urbara] (748 m)
- Urreako Haitza (784 m)

=== Peaks to 1,000 metres (3,300 ft) ===
- Agaotz (974 m)
- Akaitz Txiki (942 m)
- Amezti (mendia) (982 m)
- Amiltzu (828 m)
- Arastortzeko-gaña (813 m)
- Ausa-gaztelu (904 m)
- Egillor (mendia) (911 m)
- Intzartzu (811 m)
- Laparmendi (812 m)
- Leitzadi (921 m)
- Malkorburu (862 m)
- Martxabaleta (841 m)
- Marumendi (821 m)
- Sarastarri (996 m)
- Serlo Gaina (919 m)

=== Peaks to 1,200 metres (3,900 ft) ===
- Akaitz (1.078 m)
- Akier (1.124 m)
- Alitzako Malkorra (1.069 m)
- Alleko (1.018 m)
- Arriolatz (1.176 m)
- Balerdi (1.197 m)
- Debata (1.139 m)
- Elorrigañe (1.063 m)
- Etitzegi (1.196 m)
- Gaztelu (mendia) (1.085 m)
- Iparraundi (1.064 m)
- Iruaundi (1.064 m)
- Larrazpil (1.066 m)
- Larraone (1.199 m)
- Maldako Punta (1.012 m)
- Soroaundi (1.045 m)
- Txurtxur (1.069 m)
- Zabalegi (mendia) (1.114 m)

=== Peaks to 1,400 metres (4,600 ft) ===
- Aitzear (1.286 m)
- Alborta (1.228 m)
- Aoki (mountain)|Aoki (1.317 m)
- Aparein (1.261 m)
- Artxueta (1.343 m)
- Atallorbe (1.275 m)
- Arbelo (1.332 m)
- Arrubigaña (1.318 m)
- Artubi (1.263 m)
- Auntzizegi (1.248 m)
- Beaskin (1.242 m)
- Beleku I (1.256 m)
- Beoin (1.350 m)
- Beloki (mendia)|Beloki (1.271 m)
- Desamendi (1.305 m)
- Desamendi Txiki (1.261 m)
- Egurbide (1.317 m)
- Egurtegi (1.320 m)
- Elizkaitz (1.215 m)
- Erlabeltzeko Puntie (1.312 m)
- Elizkaitz (1.215 m)
- Erlabeltzeko Puntie (1.312 m)
- Errenaga (1.282 m)
- Errenaga Txiki (1.277 m)
- Eulata (1.281 m)
- Ganbo Txiki (1.382 m)
- Gañeta (1.323 m)
- Hirupagoeta (1.235 m)
- Ipuzmeaka (1.216 m)
- Kargaleku II (1.253 m)
- Kobagaine (1.324 m)
- Kurutzeaga (1.308 m)
- Labeongo Punte (1.293 m)
- Malkorri (1.329 m)
- Mendiaundi I (1.307 m)
- Olamuño (1.261 m)
- Ondar-txuri (1.220 m)
- Ontzanburu (1.281 m)
- Pagota (1.271 m)
- Pallardi (1.290 m)
- Pardarri (1.393 m)
- Putreaizko Punta (1.383 m)
- Putxerri (1.299 m)
- Salingain (1.322 m)
- San Miguel (mountain)|San Miguel (1.237 m)
- Subizelaigañe (1.209 m)
- Ttutturre (1.282 m)
- Txameni (1.299 m)
- Larrunarri/Txindoki (1.245 m)
- Txorrotxeta (1.273 m)
- Uakorri (1.306 m)
- Uarrain I (1.346 m)
- Uarrain II (1.221 m)
- Uazkuru (1.249 m)
- Urkute (1.328 m)
- Uzkuiti (1.332 m)
- Zumalerdi (1.215 m)

=== Peaks to 1,600 metres (5,200 ft) ===
- Aldaon (1.411 m)
- Beldarri (1.405 m)
- Ganboa (1.402 m)
- Intzako dorrea (1.431 m)

=== Best known peaks ===
- Aldaon (1,411m)
- Artubi (1,262m)
- Artxueta (1,343m)
- Balerdi (1,195m)
- Beoain (1,359m)
- Ganboa (1,412m)
- Irumugarrieta (1,431m)
- Pardarri (1,393m)
- Putterri (1,299m)
- Uarrain (1,346m)
- Txindoki or Larrunarri (1,346 m).

== See also ==
- The Aralar Party is named after the range.
