= Balerdi =

Mountain in Gipuzkoa, Navarre, Spain

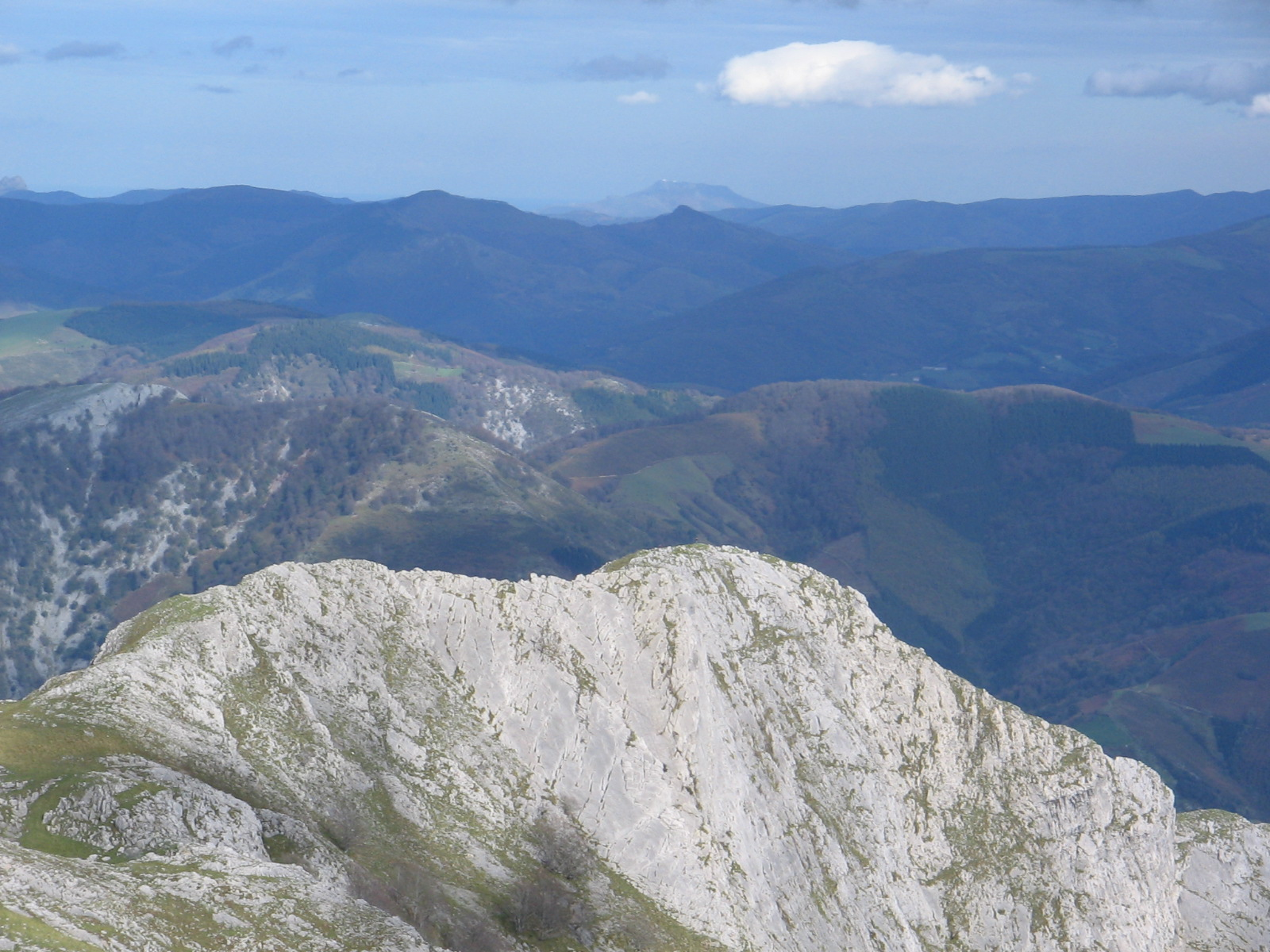
- View of the outline of Balerdi; La Rhune in the far distance

Highest point
- Elevation: 1,195 m (3,921 ft)
- Coordinates: 43°01′53.03″N 2°02′00.03″W

Naming
- Language of name: Basque
- Pronunciation: Basque: [baˈleɾdi]

Geography
- Location: Gipuzkoa, Navarre, Spain
- Parent range: Basque Mountains, Aralar

Climbing
- Easiest route: From Gaintza or Azkarate

Balerdi (1,195 m), also called Mallozarra, is a mountain of the Aralar massif closing the mountain range at its northern end as well as standing last in the imposing ridge-line called the Malloak (a term used by locals to refer to them, translating roughly as 'jagged ridge') looming over the valley Araitz. It lies on the border between Gipuzkoa and Navarre as most of Aralar forms the border between both Spanish provinces. Despite its descending shape from the higher mount Artubi, the summit is popular with locals and hikers for its characteristic outline of limestone walls and the tricky access to the summit at the end of a narrow rocky stretch with cliffs on either side. As a result, there have been many fatal accidents.

The main access points are in the villages at the foot of the mountain, i.e. Gaintza (388 m) and Azkarate (460 m) on the Navarrese side. The trail rises west in a zigzag to the pass of Astunalde (1203 m), the ascent being steep. It takes no more than to 2 hours on foot. Another approach starts in the Gipuzkoan town of Amezketa and leads through the highland valley of the quarries (Minak). It takes 2.5 hours to reach the top of Balerdi from there and the paths are signposted clearly all along.
