= Aralar =

Aralar may refer to:

- Aralar Range, a mountain range
- Aralar (Basque political party), a political party
