= N-240 road (Spain) =

East–west road in Spain

National road N-240
- Carretera nacional N-240

Route information
- Length: 301.28 km (Note: The segments in Álava and Biscay are 18.48 km (11.48 mi) and 32.92 km (20.46 mi) long, respectively. The length in Aragon and Catalonia is 249.88 km (155.27 mi).) (187.21 mi)

Major junctions
- From: Tarragona
- Lleida, Huesca, Jaca, Vitoria-Gasteiz
- To: Bilbao

Location
- Country: Spain

Highway system
- Highways in Spain; Autopistas and autovías; National Roads

The N-240 is a major east–west road in Spain. Originally running from Tarragona to Bilbao, several segments have been downgraded due to the construction of parallel motorways.

The road heads southeast from Bilbao over the Barazar pass to Vitoria-Gasteiz. The segment from Luko to Vitoria-Gasteiz has been upgraded to autovía standards. From Alsasua to Pamplona the road was known as N-240-A, but the stretch between Alsasua to Irurtzun has been upgraded to the Autovía A-10. From Pamplona to Jaca, the Autovía A-21 is being built parallel to the old N-240. The Navarrese section parallel to the A-21 has been renamed as NA-2420.

From Huesca to Lleida the N-240 runs parallel to the Autovía A-22. In the last section, between Montblanc and Tarragona, the Autovía A-27 was built as an alternative to the old N-240.
