= Beriain =

Mountain in Spain

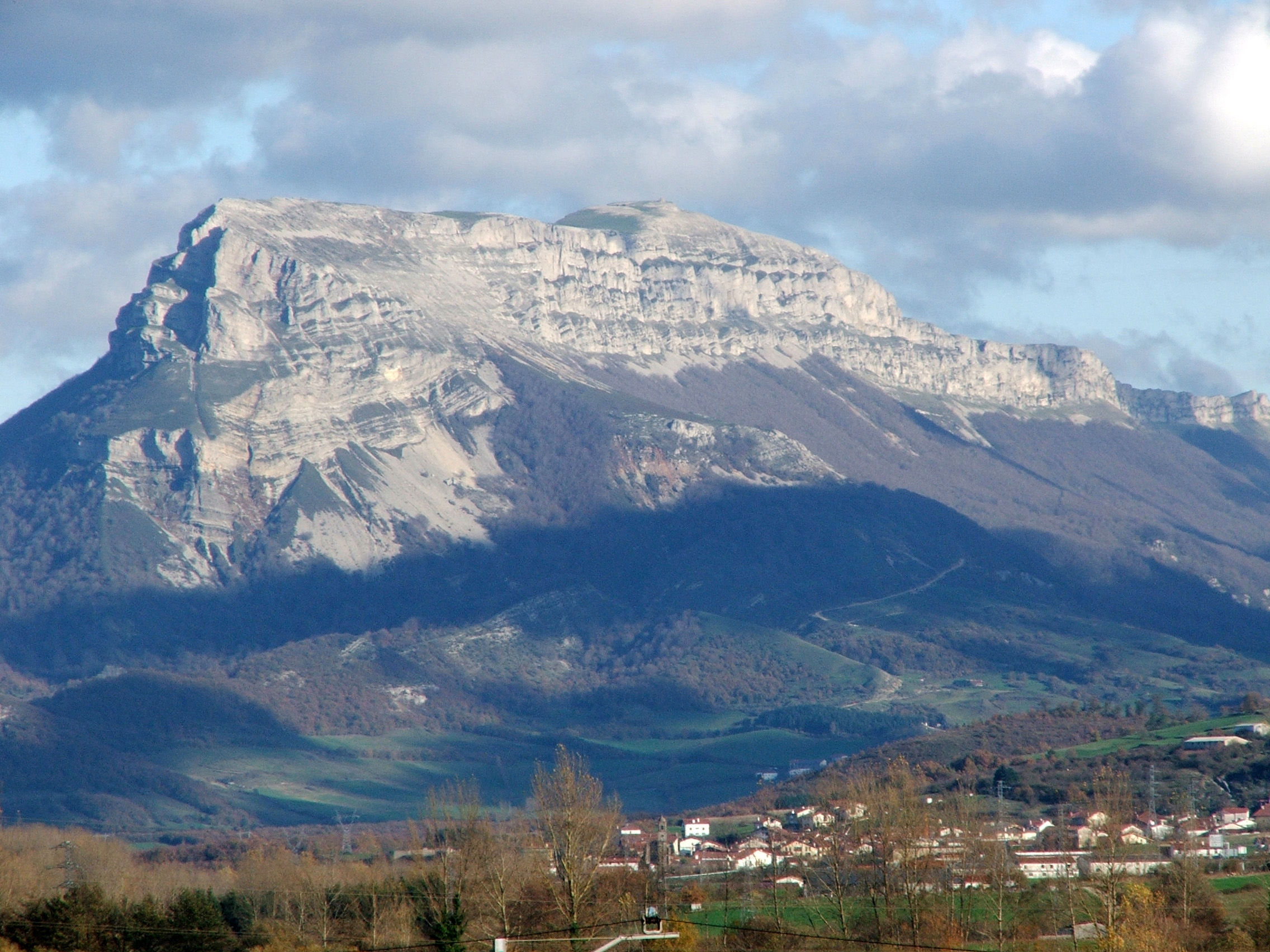
- Mount Beriain from Altsasu

Highest point
- Elevation: 1,493 m (4,898 ft)
- Coordinates: 42°53′34″N 1°59′52″W

Naming
- Language of name: Basque

Geography
- Location: Navarre, Spain
- Parent range: Andia

Climbing
- First ascent: unknown
- Easiest route: climb

Beriain (also San Donato after the chapel at the top) is a 1,493 metres high peak part of the Basque Mountains range, located in the Andia range of western Navarre, Spain. Its sharp profile is an iconic image in the Burunda and Barranca valleys that link Vitoria-Gasteiz and Pamplona. The peak is located at the center of the traditional Basque Country provinces.
