= Autovía A-22 =

Motorway from Lérida to Huesca (Spain)

Autovía A-22
- Autovía Huesca-Lleida
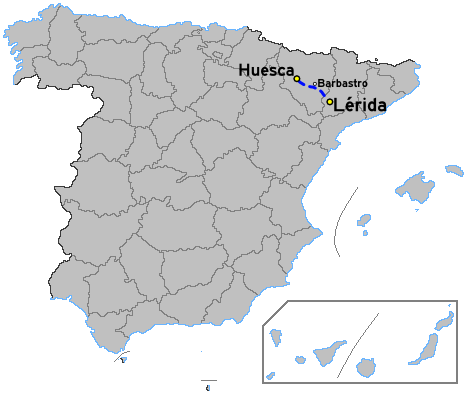

Route information
- Length: 110 km (68 mi)

Major junctions
- From: Huesca
- To: Lleida

Location
- Country: Spain

Highway system
- Highways in Spain; Autopistas and autovías; National Roads

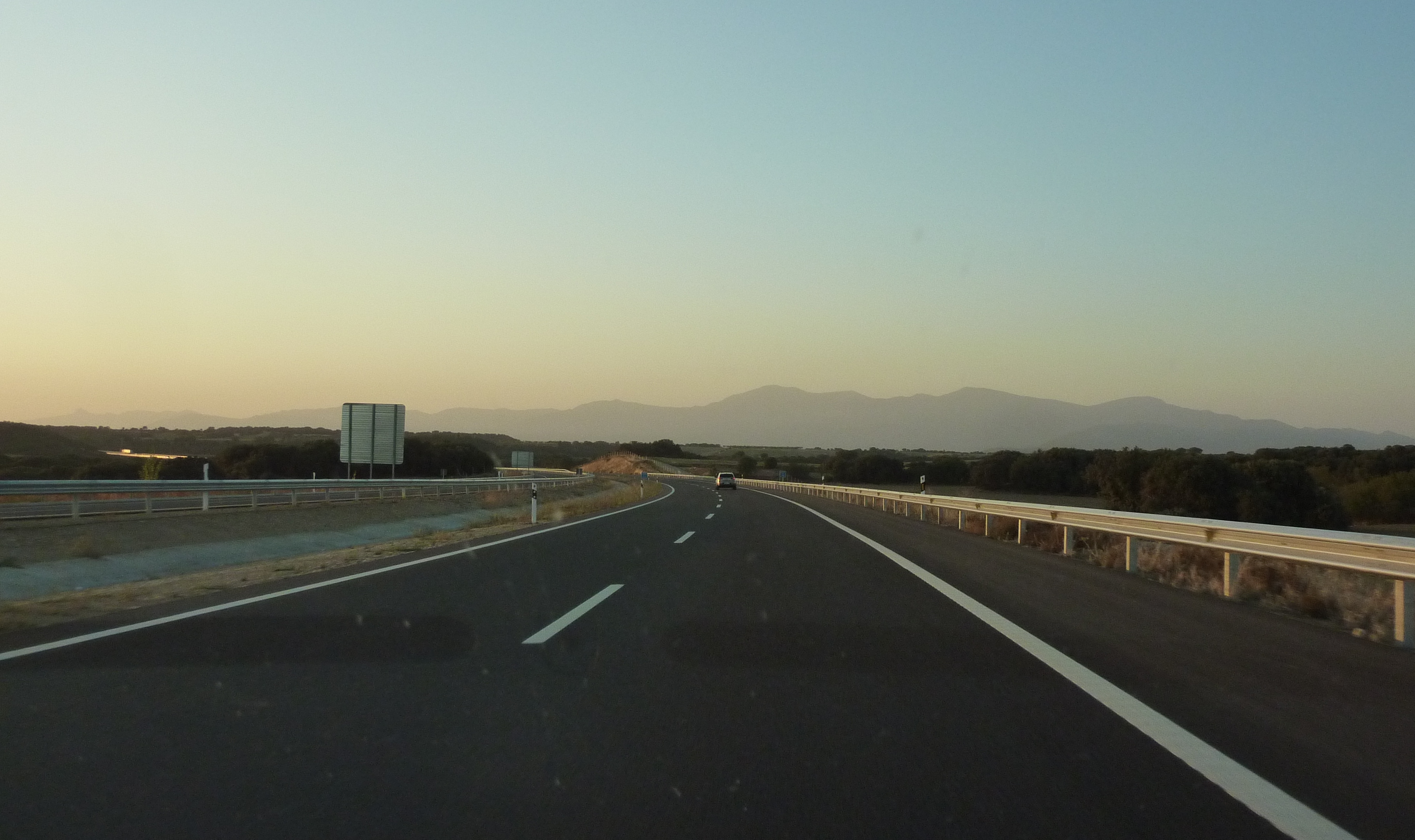
Autovía A-22 seen towards Huesca

Autovía A-22 or Autovía Huesca-Lleida is an upgrade of a section of the existing N-240 Spanish road, managed by the Spanish Government, between Huesca, the second largest city in Aragón and Lleida, a provincial capital in Catalonia. The route has all sections now open to traffic including the final 13km into Huesca.

The A-22 runs mainly in parallel to the existing N-240 road except for certain specific stretches such as the Monzón bypass which opened in 2008, and the Barbastro bypass where alternative routes have been employed. The construction has been divided into the following sectors, Huesca-Siétamo, Siétamo-Velillas, Velillas-Ponzano, Ponzano-El Pueyo, Barbastro Bypass, Monzón Bypass, Binéfar Bypass, Binéfar Bypass-Aragón/Catalonia border, Aragón/Catalonia border-Almacelles Bypass, Almacelles Bypass-La Cerdera, La Cerdera-Junction with A-2 Motorway at the edge of Lleida [1].

By the summer of 2010 more than half of the A-22 was operational as a four-lane highway comprising 6 of the above sectors. However, in July 2010 a cessation of work due to governmental financial difficulties was announced, despite the Binefar Bypass section being 80% complete. This decision provoked much controversy with local government officials calling for the work to be resumed, citing the dangers associated with the current unfinished road layout [2]. Work was restarted and by 2012 all but one sector was fully open creating an uninterrupted length of around 99km starting from the intersection with the A-2 on the edge of Lleida. For the remaining section, the 13km Huesca - Sietamo sector, construction began in August 2018 and it was finally opened in October 2025, completing the route from Huesca to Lleida and eliminating any need to transfer to the N-240.

The A-22 provides a far more satisfactory communication between Huesca and Lleida and intermediate towns than previously offered by the N-240, but also a direct four-lane highway connection between Huesca and Barcelona, a journey which previously required a long and time-consuming diversion via Zaragoza if motorway standard roads were used. With the final sector completed, the A-22 now provides direct access to the Autovía A-23 serving Jaca (Aragón) and connecting to the Autovía A-21 for Pamplona (Navarra) using highways which are also undergoing the process of upgrading.

The improvements in road communication between Lleida and the province of Huesca are occurring in parallel to developments on the railways in the Lleida area, where a new network of commuter trains (Cercanias) is under consideration. This may include a regular commuter service connecting Lleida, Almacelles, Binéfar, Monzón [3] - all of which are communities served by the N-240 and A-22.

List of major towns connected by the existing N-240 and the A-22, includes Lleida, Almacelles, Binéfar, Monzón, Barbastro and Huesca.
