= Lakuntza =

Municipality of Spain

Coordinates: 42.923°N 2.021°W

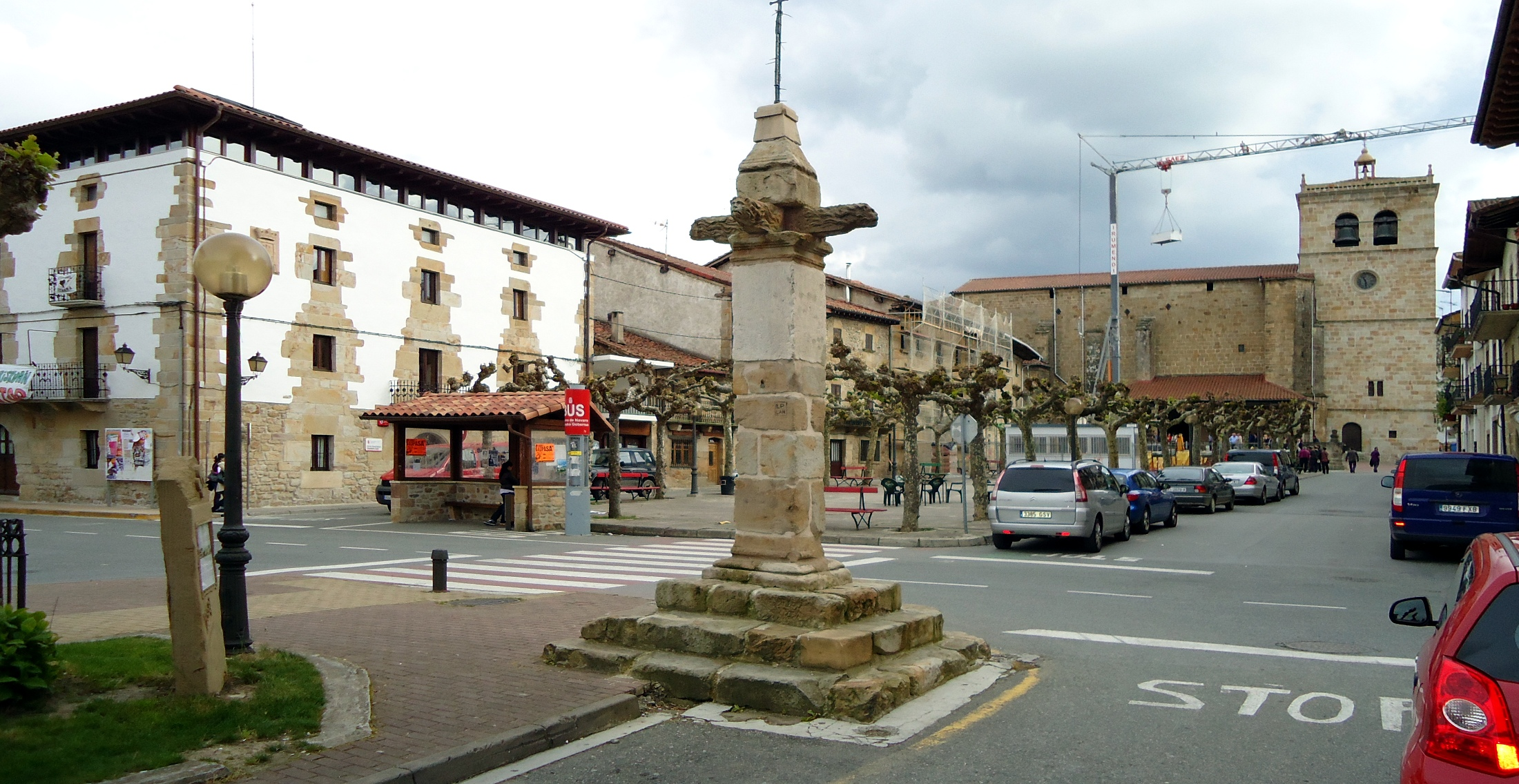
The center of Lakuntza Village

Lakuntza (Spanish: Lacunza) is a town and municipality located in the autonomous community of Navarra, in northern Spain.
