= Andia Range =

Mountain range in Navarre, Spain

Andia
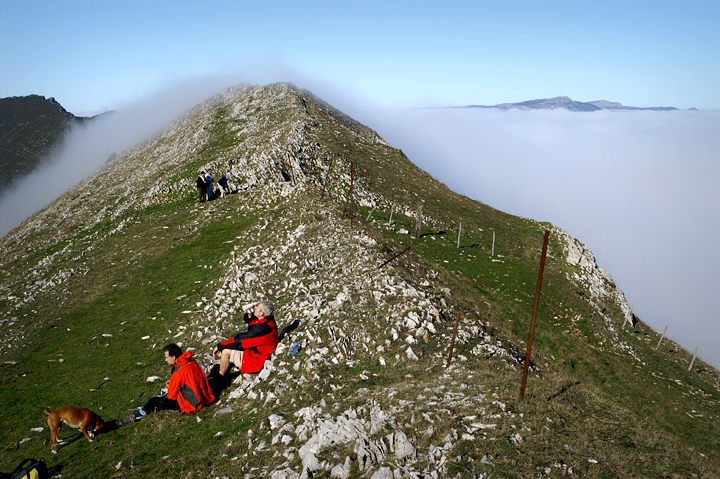
- View of the 1,125 m high Txurregi peak

Highest point
- Elevation: 1,493 m (4,898 ft)
- Coordinates: 42°53′34″N 1°59′52″W

Naming
- Native name: Andimendi (Basque); Sierra de Andía (Spanish)

Geography
- Location: Navarre, Spain
- Parent range: Basque Mountains

Climbing
- First ascent: unknown
- Easiest route: climb

The Andia Range (Andimendi in Basque and Sierra de Andía in Spanish) is a mountain range of western Navarre, Spain, part of the Basque Mountains. Its highest point is the 1,493-metre-high Beriain.

Together with the neighboring Urbasa range, Andia is part of the Urbasa-Andia Natural Park.

== Peaks ==
1. Beriain 1493 m.
2. Ihurbain 1416 m.
3. Lezitza 1350 m.
4. Amorro 1348 m.
5. Peña Blanca 1269 m.
6. Pagomotxeta 1237 m.
7. Euskal Herriko Erdigunea 1236 m.
8. Eskalaborro 1228 m.
9. Aitzorrotz 1192 m.
10. Dorrokoteka 1176 m.
11. Saratsa 1171 m.
12. Alto de las Bordas Viejas 1265 m
13. Elimendi 1133 m
14. Elordia 1235 m
15. Gaztelu III 1001 m
16. Idoitxiki 1272 m
17. Trinidad de Iturgoien 1222 m
18. Malkasko 1237 m
19. Mendizelaia 982 m
20. Mugaga 1217 m
21. Satrustegi II 1139 m
22. Txurregi 1125 m
23. Zoiolagana 1152 m
24. Lardanburu 1183 m
