= Arruazu =

Coordinates: 42°55′N 2°00′W

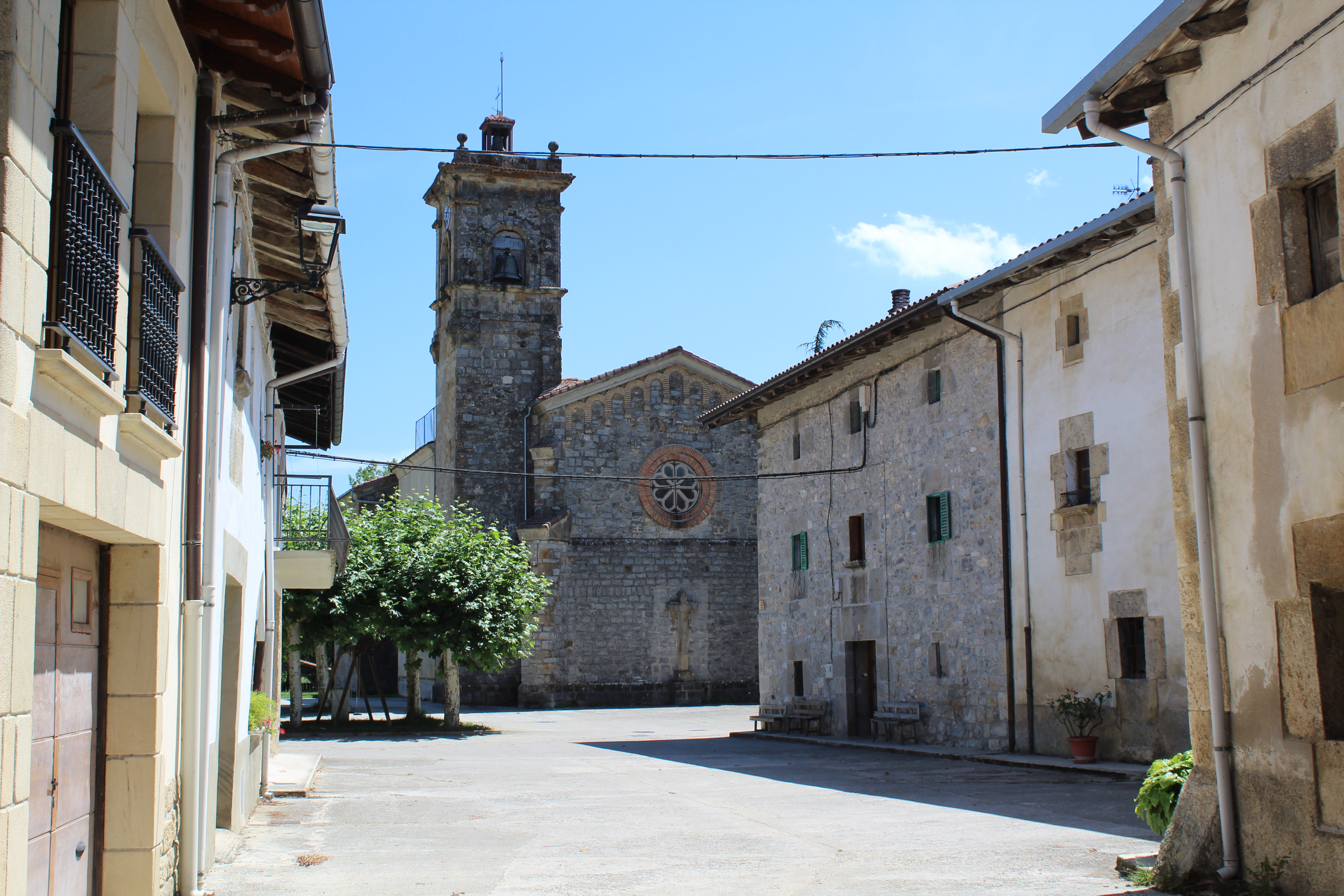
- Church in Arruazu

- Coat of arms

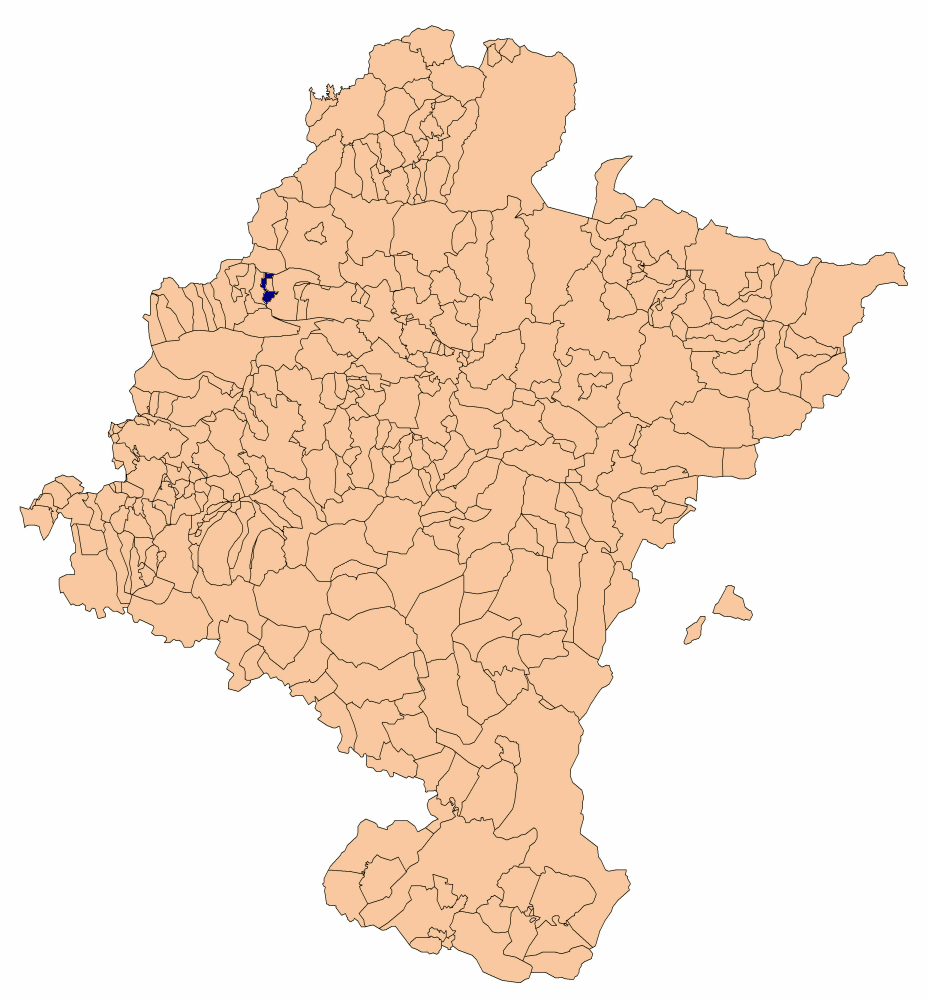
- Map of Arruazu
- Country: Spain

Arruazu is a town and municipality located in the province and autonomous community of Navarre, northern Spain. As of census 2017, there are 101 inhabitants in the area.
