= Bakaiku =

Municipality in Navarre, Spain

Coordinates: 42°53.55′N 2°06.12′W

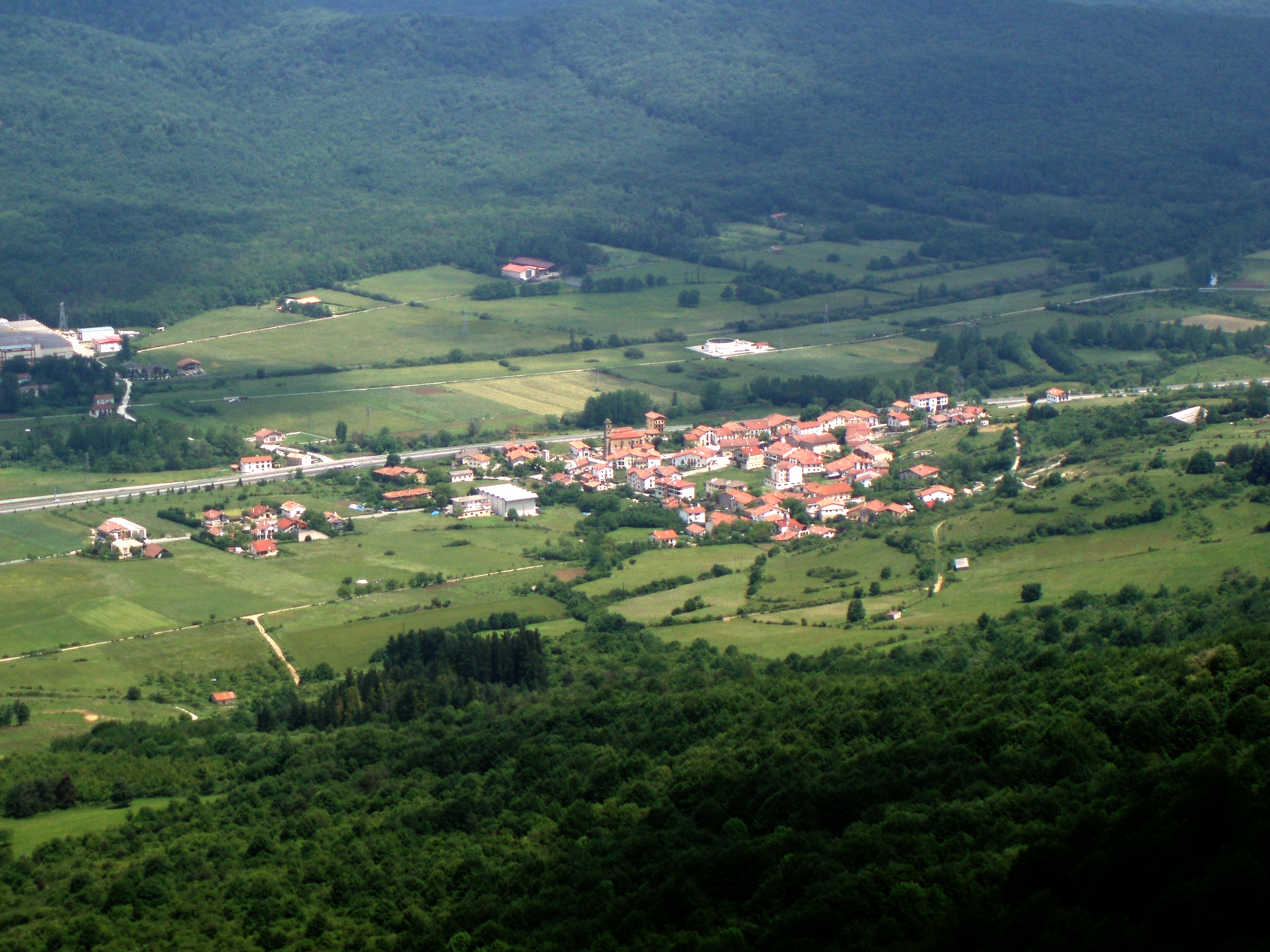
Bakaiku desde Santa Marina

Bakaiku's flag

Bakaiku's coat of arms

Bakaiku is a town and municipality located in the province and autonomous community of Navarre, northern Spain. It has 359 inhabitants and is an average 515 m above mean sea level.
