= Irañeta =

Town and municipality in northern Spain

Coordinates: 42°55′N 1°56′W

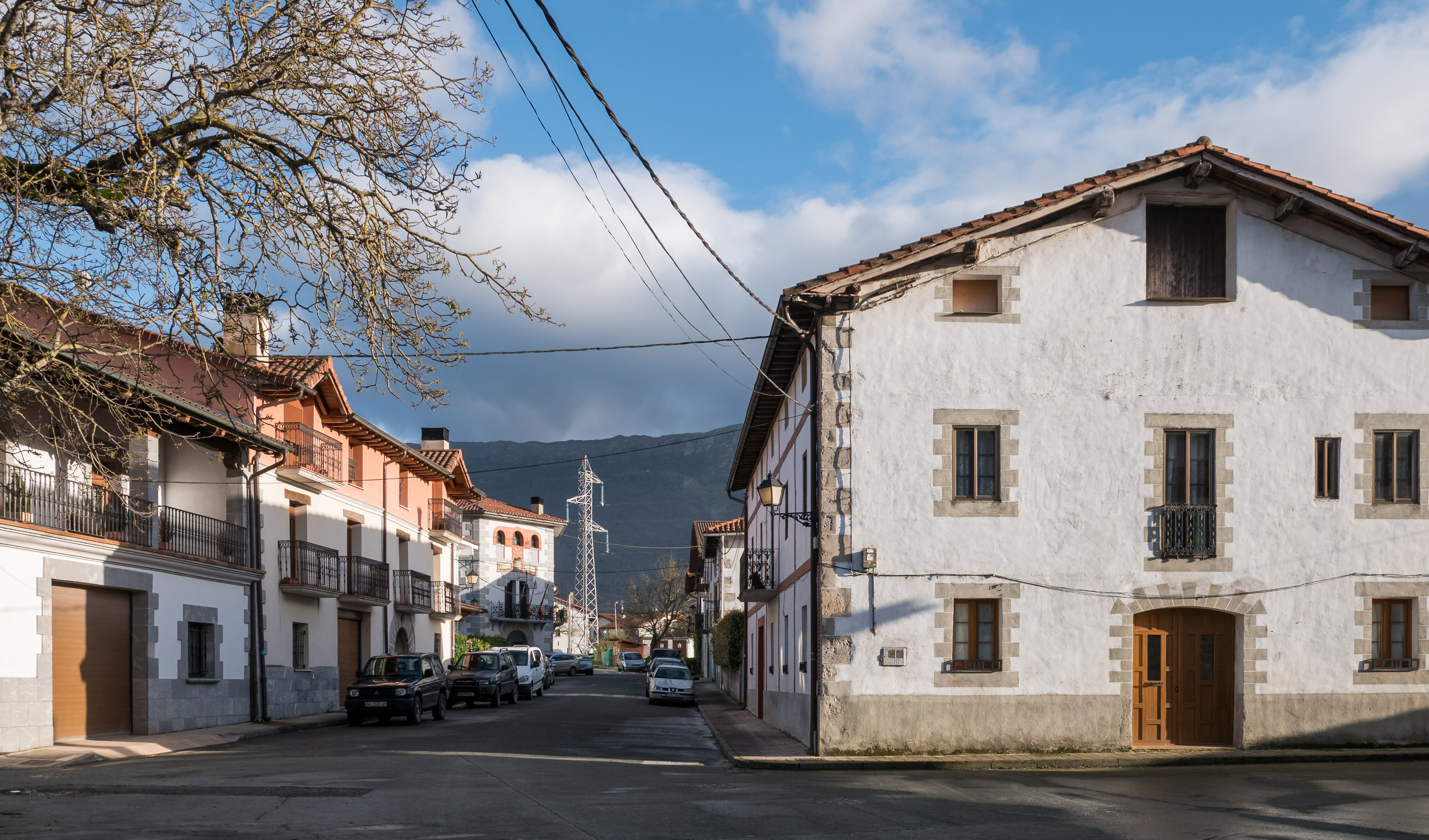
Town of Irañeta

Irañeta is a town and municipality located in the province and autonomous community of Navarre, northern Spain. It is located 195 miles North-East of Spain's capital city, Madrid. Its current population as of 2017 is a 174.
