= Urbasa =

Mountain range of western Navarre, Spain

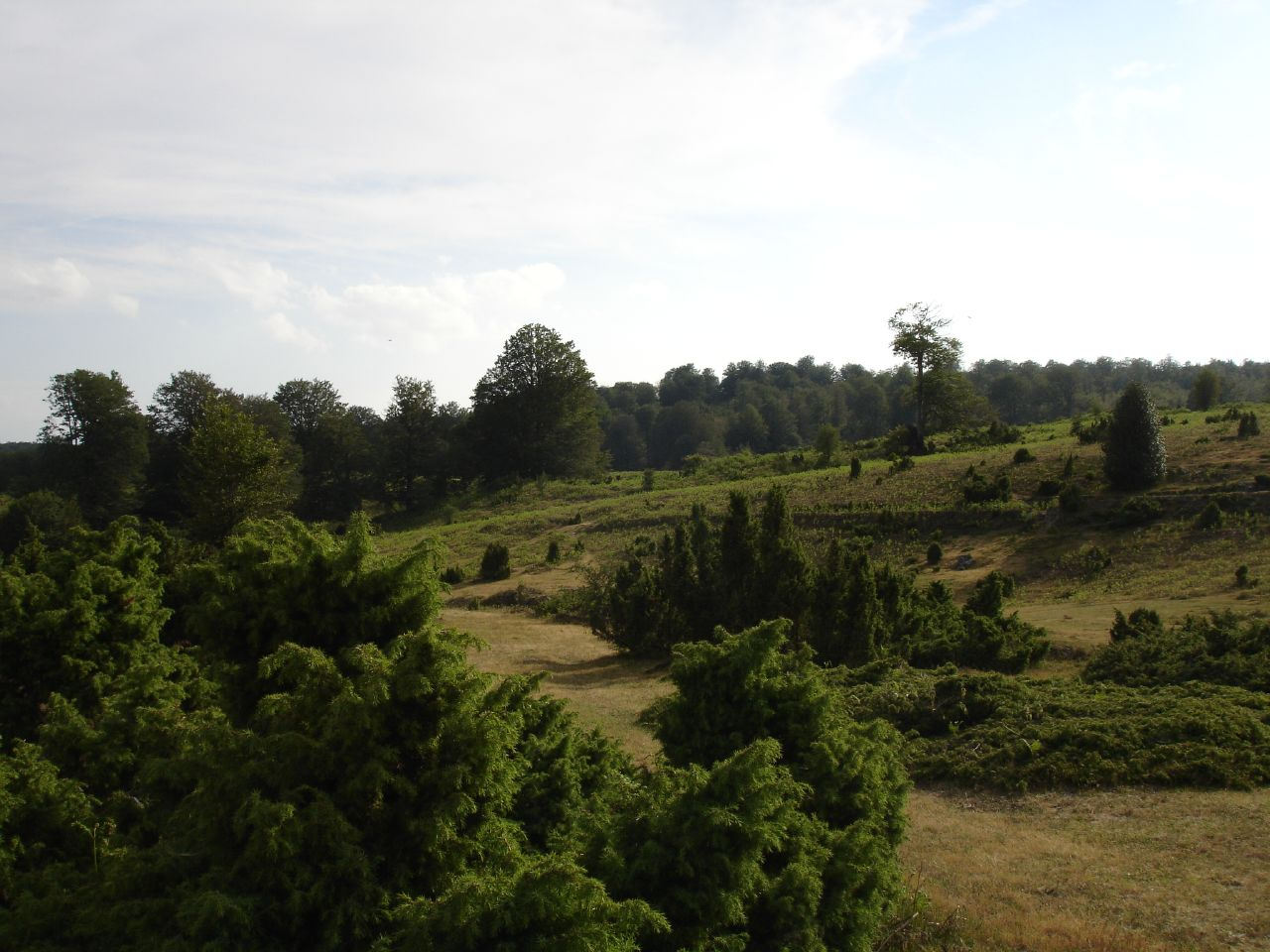
- Urbasa landscape

Highest point
- Elevation: 1,493 m (4,898 ft)
- Coordinates: 42°50′18″N 2°09′57″W

Naming
- Language of name: Basque

Geography
- Location: Navarre, Spain
- Parent range: Basque Mountains

Location of the Urbasa Range in Navarre.

The Urbasa Range (Urbasa mendilerroa in Basque and Sierra de Urbasa in Spanish) is a mountain range of western Navarre, Spain, part of the Basque Mountains. Its highest point is the 1,183-metre-high Baiza.

Urbasa is a karstic range where numerous nummulites fossils have been found.

Together with the neighboring Andia range, Urbasa is part of the Urbasa-Andia Natural Park.

== Peaks ==
1. Baiza 1,183 m.
2. Iruaitzeta 1,144 m.
3. Santa Marina 1,068 m.
4. Bargagain 1,157 m.
