= Uharte-Arakil =

Town and municipality in Navarre, Spain

Coordinates: 42.917°N 1.967°W

- Uharte-Arakil
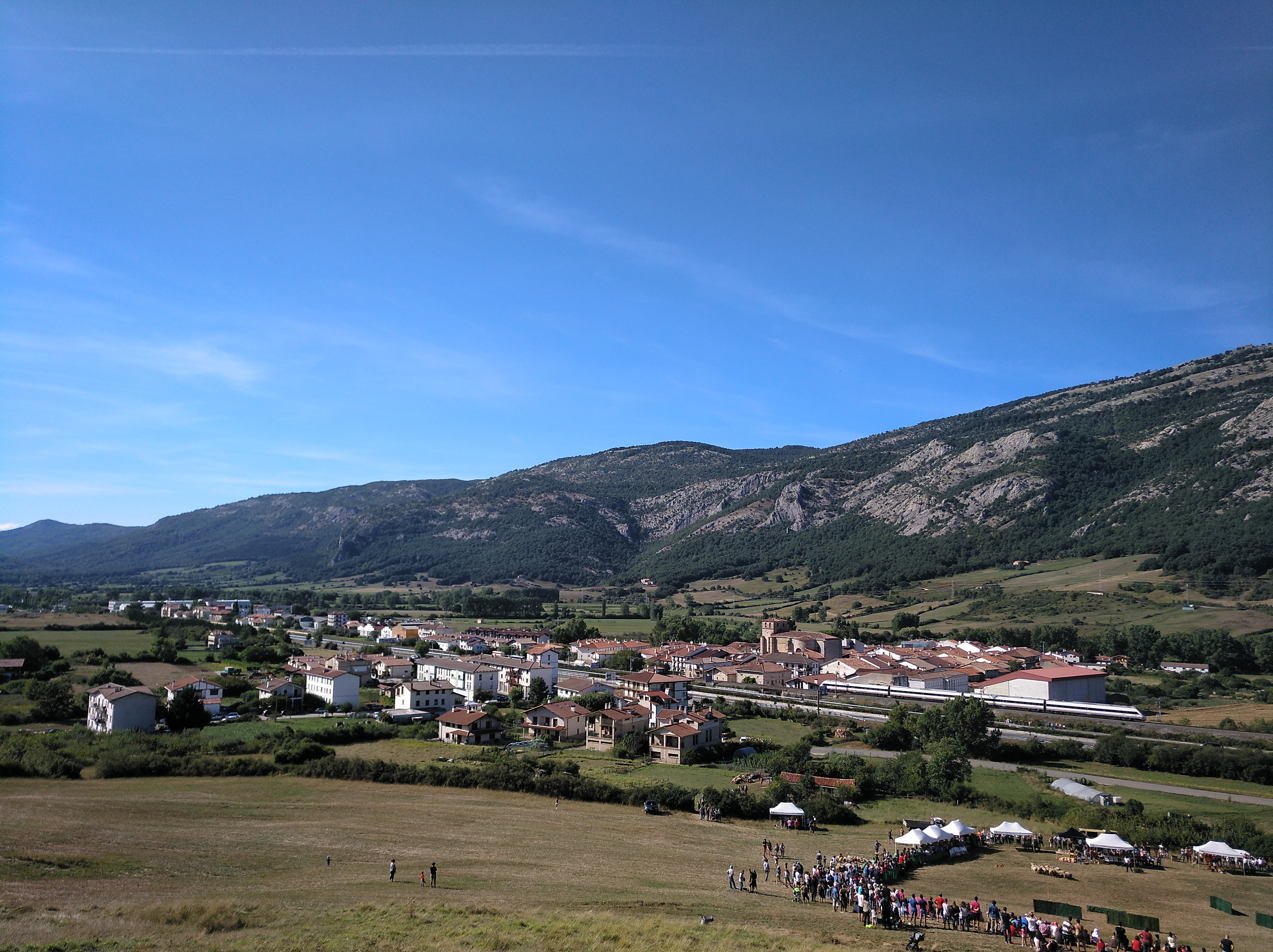
- The town of Arakil Island, Sakana, Navarre

- Coat of arms

- Map of Uharte-Arakil

Uharte-Arakil is a town and municipality located in the province and autonomous community of Navarre, northern Spain.

== History ==
=== Etymology ===
Its name Huarte came from the expression in the Basque language ur arte ('between waters'). In modern Basque, the word uharte or ugarte with shares the same etymological origin.

Its most common meaning is that of 'island'. But it can also mean between waters, Entrambasaguas, a place located between two confluent rivers.

There are numerous places in Navarre and the Basque Autonomous Community that have this name or a similar variant, being generally located at river confluences or meanders.

The town of Huarte-Araquil was founded in a strategic location. It is a narrowing of the Barranca and supported by a meander of the Arakil river that served to help in the defense of the population. The population has now spread outside the limits of the meander of the Araquil where it was originally established.

In 1268, it was mentioned as Huart, then Uart (1350), Uart de Valo d'Araquil (1366), Huarte de Val de Araquil (1610), 1 Ugarte Araquil (1701) and Hugarte Araquil (1708).

Historically, the town has thus in its name the nickname of Araquil, which is the name of the valley in which the municipality sits. It is also whose jurisdiction it was detached in the 14th century. It was necessary since there is another homonymous locality in Navarre called Huarte.

Uharte Arakil is currently the official name of the town. After June 8, 1992, by means of regional decree 212/1992, it became its official name.
