= Irurtzun =

Town and municipality in northern Spain

Coordinates: 42.917°N 1.817°W

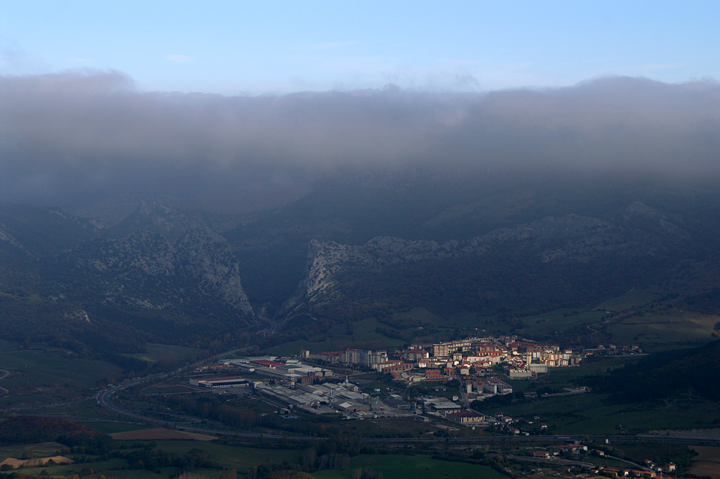
A night view of Irurtzun

Irurtzun (Spanish: Irurzun) is a town and municipality located in the province and autonomous community of Navarre, northern Spain.

Irurtzun became an independent municipality after separating from the larger administrative council of Arakil. This separation was formalized on 1996.
