= Txindoki =

Mountain in the Basque Autonomous Community of Spain

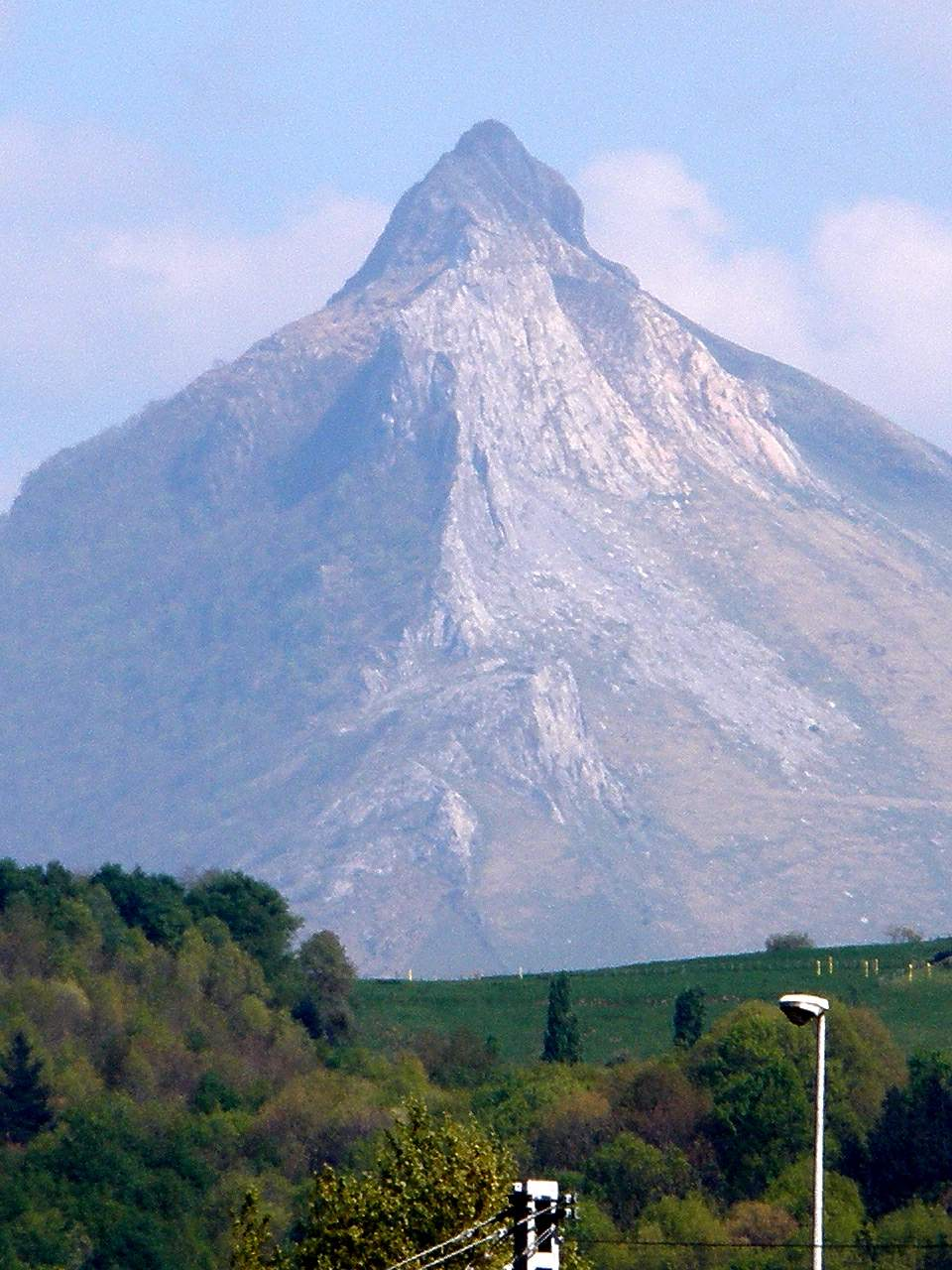
- Txindoki from Beasain

Highest point
- Elevation: 1,346 m (4,416 ft)
- Coordinates: 43°01′21.28″N 2°05′15.18″W

Naming
- Language of name: Basque
- Pronunciation: Basque: [tʃinˈdoki]

Geography
- Location: Gipuzkoa, Spain
- Parent range: Basque Mountains, Aralar

Climbing
- Easiest route: From Larraitz in Abaltzisketa

Txindoki or Larrunarri is an iconic mountain (1,346 m) located in the region of Goierri, Gipuzkoa, in the Basque Autonomous Community of Spain. Originally Larrunarri or Ñañarri (Basque pronunciation: [ɲa'ɲari]), the mount took on the popularized name Txindoki by extension after some shepherd huts nearby. It is sometimes referred to as the Basque Matterhorn too, because of its pyramidal shape.

It stands out as the westernmost mountainous tip of the Aralar mountain range, with an easily recognized image that has become a symbol for all the Goierri valley. The towering mountain stands above the northern town Amezketa and its scattered farmhouses at its foot. For the most part, it is not covered in forest just like most of the Gipuzkoan side of Aralar. The steep slopes of the northern face and the Muitze valley are the wild part of Txindoki. The northern and southern side are clearly delimited by a rocky limestone crest running east to west up to the summit, which is almost entirely bare rock. The steep sides of the crest are popular with amateur rock climbers.

== Access points and trails ==
=== Main route ===
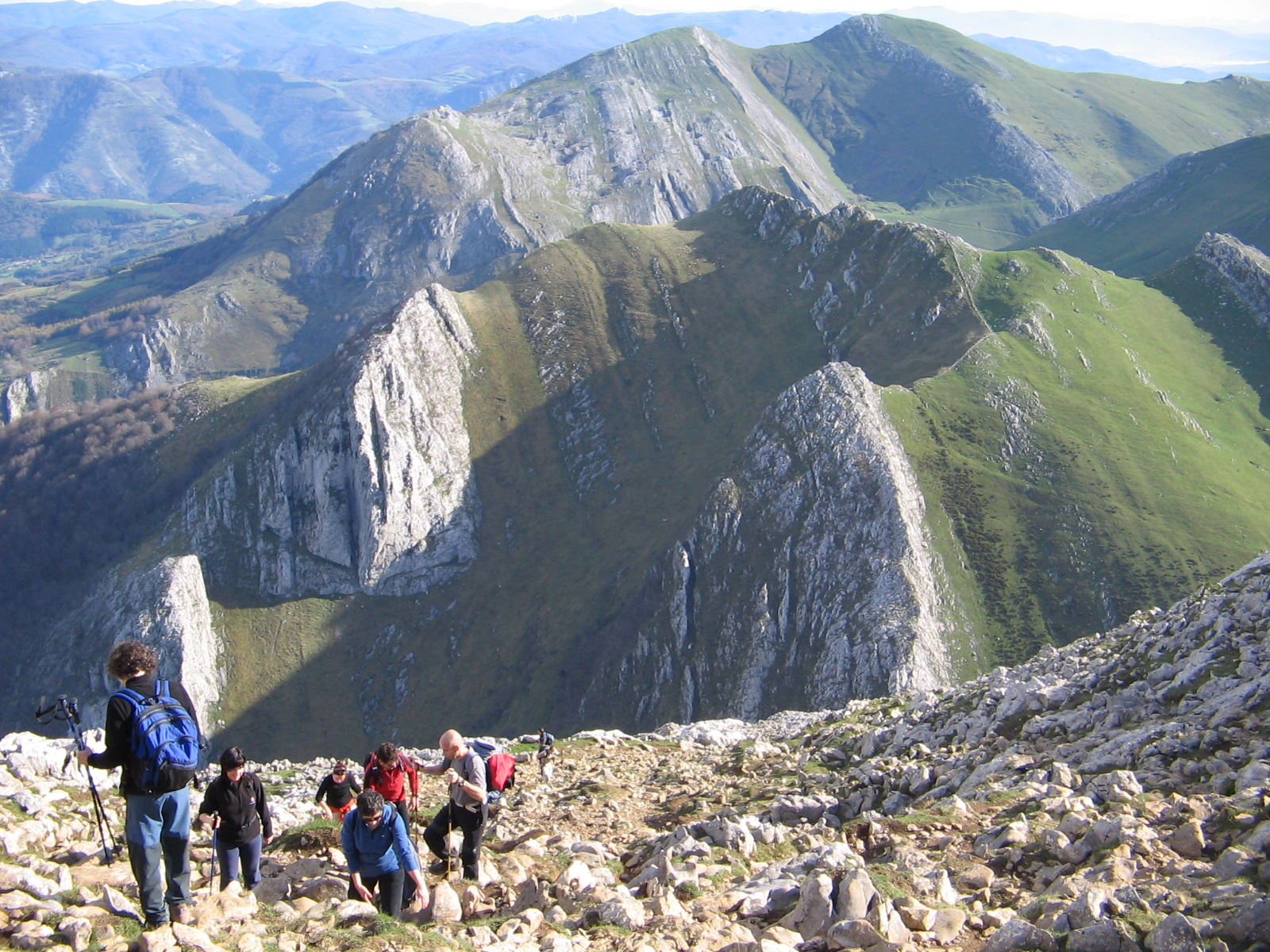
View to the east from Txindoki

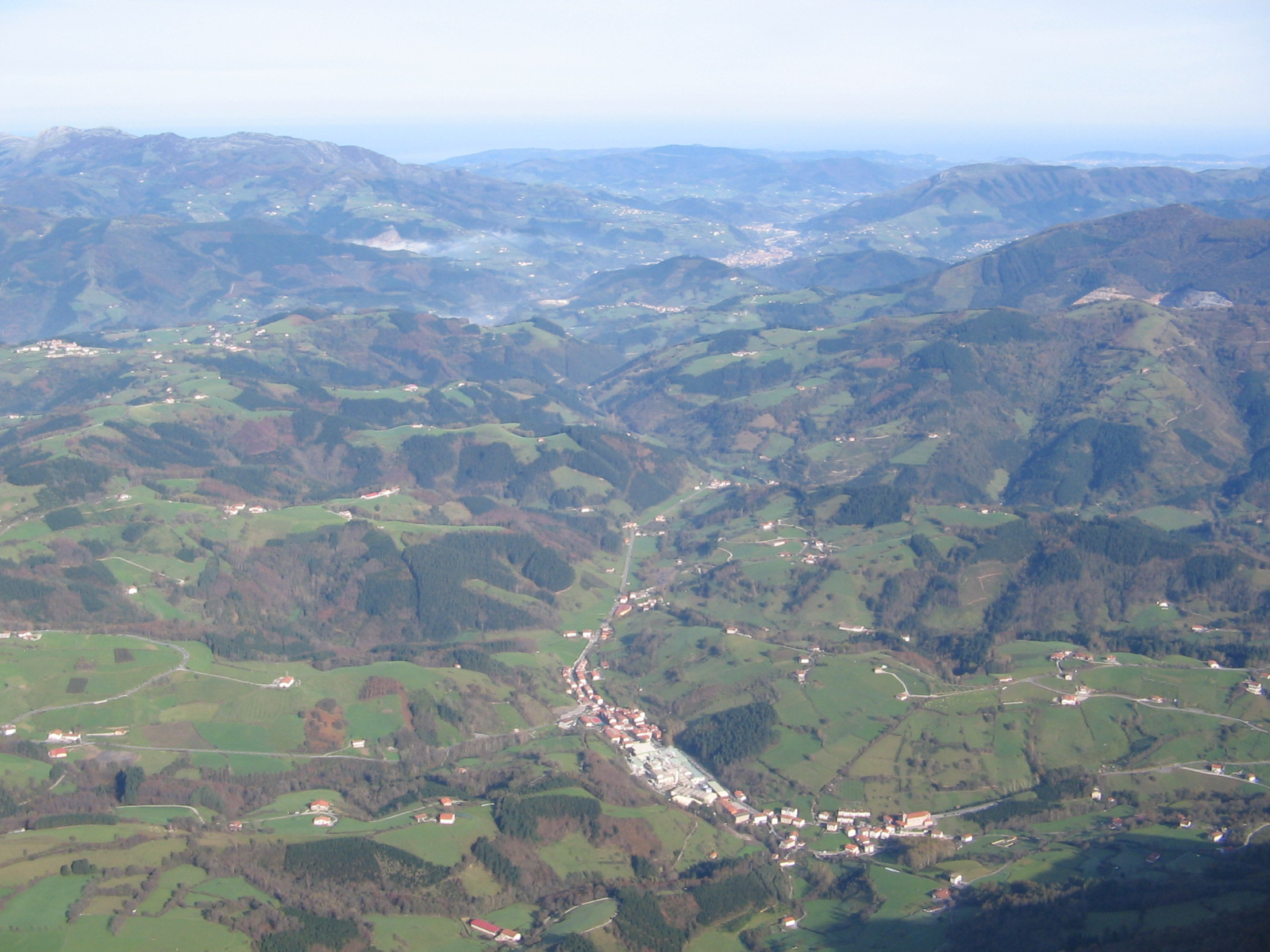
Amezketa at the foot, the Hernio massif to the far left, the Oria valley and San Sebastián in the distance

The main and most popular access point is from the neighbourhood Larraitz (Basque pronunciation: [la'raits]). From Alegia (N-1) the minor road GI-3670 that switches to the GI-2133 in the last stretch reaches Larraitz in about 15 minutes; alternatively, it can be reached by taking the GI-2133 starting in Ordizia (N-1 E-05 E-80), taking about the same time. Larraitz, lying at 403 m (943 m below the summit), harbours the long picnic area and car park Zamao, with a couple of café-restaurants (former farmhouses) and a hermitage (17th century) all surrounded by gentle fields.

From the southern end of the area, a broad dust track heads south-west, forking shortly afterwards with the left hand track leading to Txindoki. The broad track peters out into a beaten trail that turns east at the lower end of the crest (15 min). Next, it cuts its way straight across the southern side of the mountain along a pine tree plantation on the right till the spring Oria is reached at a sharp bend. After some zigzag and steep slopes heading south-west (1h00), the huts of Zirigarate are reached, which stand on a hollow. From Zirigarate, the trail heads east to the col of Egurral (1,152 m), the last milestone before the final struggle to the summit largely through karst terrain (1h45). On sunny Sundays of Summer and Spring people walk in droves to the top. Breathtaking scenery from the peak all over Gipuzkoa and Aralar on a clear day. The summit is covered with small memorials and a postbox for hikers.

Alternatively, the hard way up can be taken at the spring Oria by heading east out of the main trail through a tough grassy slope that ends up at the col of Egurral.

=== The Muitze route ===
Another option consists of starting off from Larraitz with a view to ascending through the northern wild valley of Muitze, unknown to most hikers. This time the same track may be followed in the beginning for a convenient and gentle stroll, until a winding slope is overcome some minutes before the turning of the crest (milestone Gazteraztegi, 520 m). There a broad track sets off back in the opposite direction, going up until it gets to an aerial at Urtzabal goikoa (610 m). Alternatively, a short-cut heads up cross-country straight on to the aerial from Larraitz, so gaining height in little time but with some effort. Right before the final slope to the aerial, a narrow path bounds south-east on the left into the tough and vertical valley carved by the stream Muitze (waterfalls on the way). The trail snakes out of the forest to the right and crosses the stream at the point where the forest landscape gives way to grassland. After overcoming the rocks, the stream must be crossed again to the right. A trail on the steep slopes on the right leads to the hut Txindoki and an orchard that provided the current name to the mountain. Legend has it, close to this place the mythological character/goddess Mari dwells in a crack on the rock (Marizulo). By clinging to the steep path, the pass of Egurral is reached (1h45).

== Events ==
Every year on 1 May, flocks of cattle are gathered in Larraitz to be herded to the highland grasslands until October. The meeting takes place in a cheerful environment, with numerous public, traditional music (trikitixa) enlivening the atmosphere and stalls featuring rural produce, e.g. cider and cheese, as well as crafted products. In 2008 18,000 sheep, 650 mares and 700 cows were expected to follow the seasonal migration to Aralar. On June 29, Saint Peter's day, a big and popular religious celebration is held at the hermitage (a gathering called erromeria in Basque).
