= Basque Mountains =

Mountain range in Spain

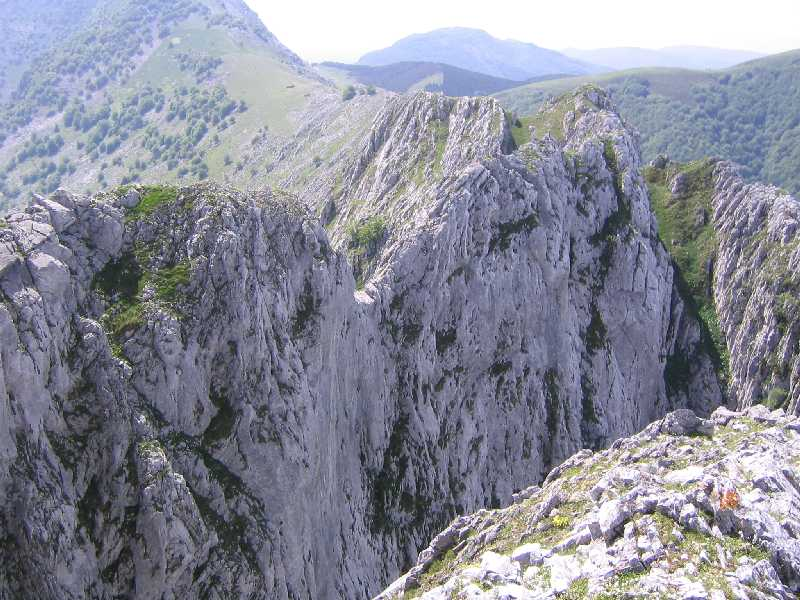
- Alluitz, typical limestone mountain of the Basque range.

Highest point
- Peak: Aizkorri
- Elevation: 1,551 m (5,089 ft)
- Listing: Mountains of Spain
- Coordinates: 42°57′N 02°19′W

Geography
- Location within Spain
- Country: Spain
- Communities: Basque Country and Navarre
- Parent range: Cantabrian Range
- Borders on: Pyrenees

Geology
- Rock type: limestone

The Basque Mountains (Note: (Spanish: Montes vascos; French : Montagnes basques; Basque: Euskal Herriko arkua, "Basque arc")) are a mountain range situated in the northern Iberian Peninsula. Geographically the range is considered as the eastern section of the larger Cantabrian Range. The range runs through the Basque Autonomous Community and western Navarre.

== Geography ==
The Basque Mountains are a transitional range between two major ones, the Cantabrian range to the west and the Pyrenees to the east. Geologists call the area "The Basque threshold" and some consider that the Cantabrian Mountains and the Pyrenees are a single greater range and the Basque Mountains are just part of both.

There are two parallel sub-ranges running from west to east, the inner one and the coastal one. In between them there is a 500 m high plateau called "Llanada Alavesa" (Alava Plains) where Vitoria-Gasteiz is located. East of the Llanada a narrow valley called Burunda and its follow-up Barranca (or Sakana in Basque) separate the two ranges, with Urbasa-Andia located to the south and Aralar to the north. The valley harbours major infrastructures linking Vitoria-Gasteiz and Pamplona.

=== Climate ===
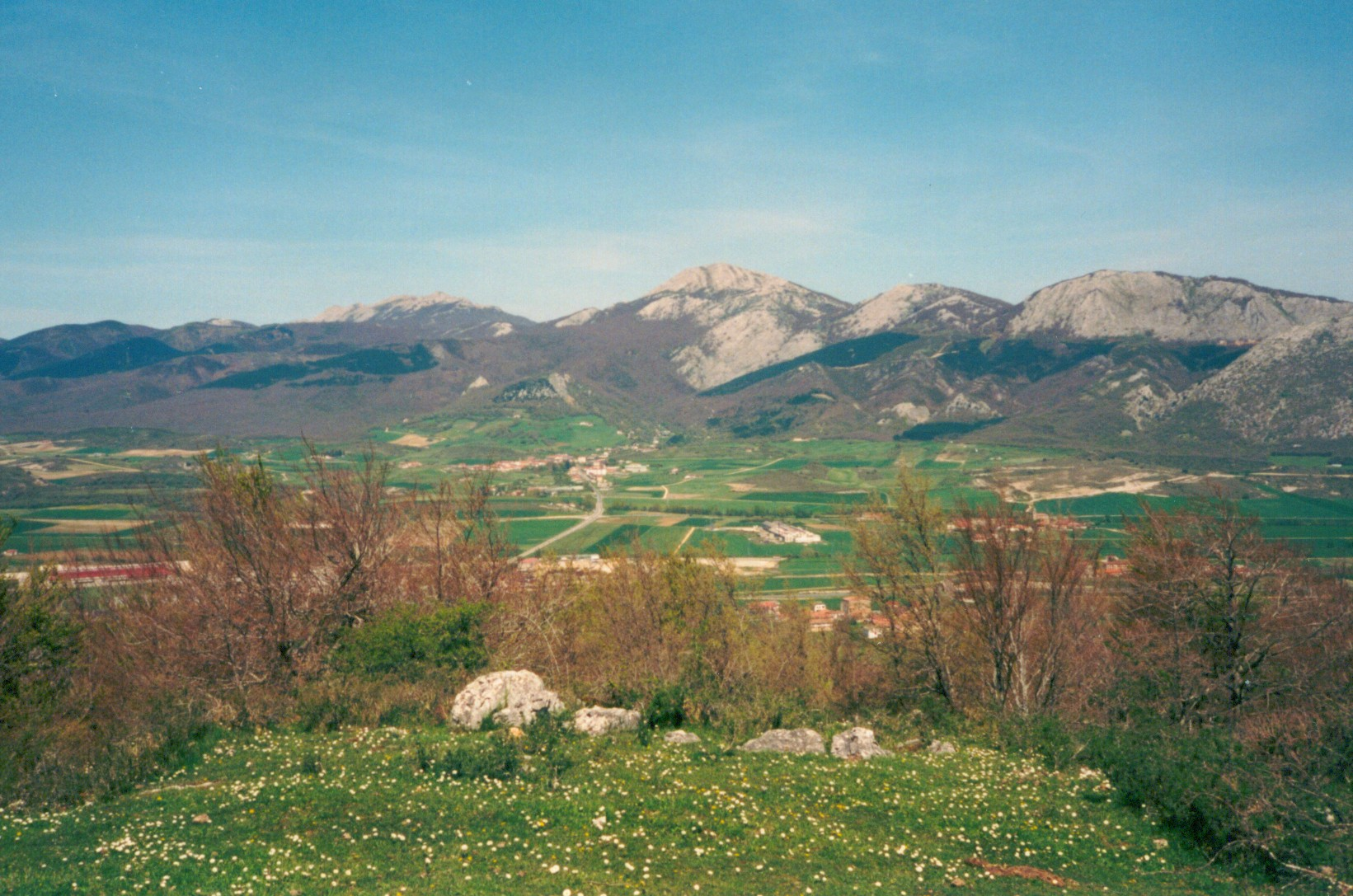
Aratz from Alava (Llanada Alavesa).

The Basque coastal range forms the water divide of the Mediterranean and Atlantic basins, the climate north of the range is milder and oceanic, typical of the so-called green Spain, while to the south of the coastal range and in the inner range winters are cold and snowy and summers drier and hotter than in the northern range, in general the climate in the Basque municipalities south of this range is more Mediterranean with some Continental traits, showing less precipitation and much colder winters than those coastal municipalities north of the range.

The snow cover is very irregular during the winter season. From November to April snow cover can be found in the Basque Mountains above 700 m AMSL, but the ever changing weather conditions of the Bay of Biscay can bring great accumulations of snow and a sudden rise of temperatures can melt it in a few days due to the Foehn wind effect. This sudden melting can cause flooding problems, specially in the plains of northern Alava.

== Massifs ==
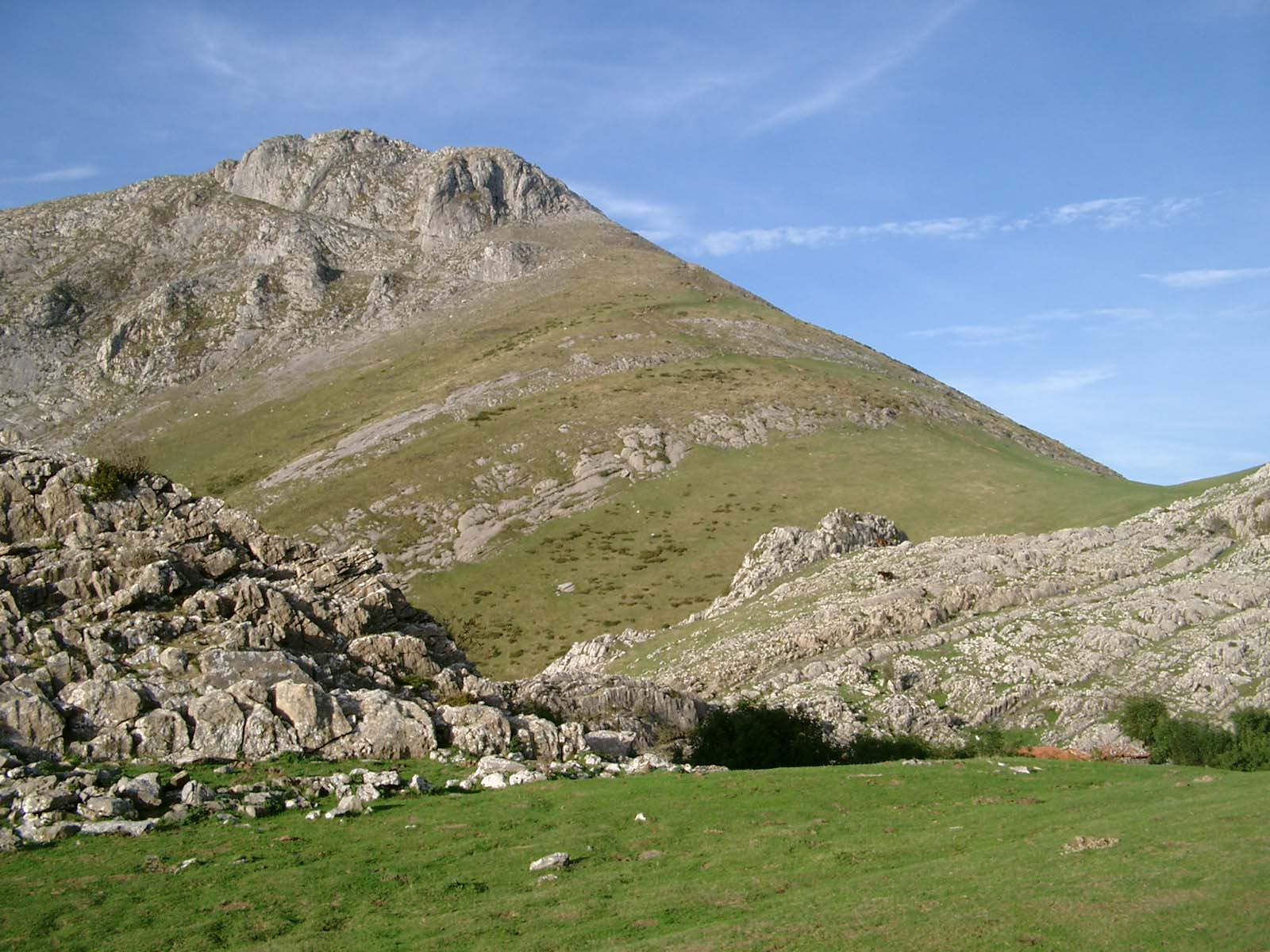
Txindoki peak, in Aralar.

It is a range of moderate height; Aitxuri (1,551 m) in the Aizkorri massif is the highest peak.

- In the inner range the main massifs from west to east are:
  - Sierra Salvada (Orduña)
  - Mounts of Vitoria, the most important is Kapildui (1,177 m)
  - Izki
  - Urbasa, a 900 m high plateau
  - Andía, with the impressive Beriain (1,493 m)
- In the coastal range its main massifs from west to east are:
  - Gorbea (Gorbeia) 1,481 m, maximum height of Biscay.
  - Urkiola, Anboto (1,331 m) being its highest peak.
  - Elgea
  - Aizkorri
  - Altzania, the Aratz is the maximum height (1,442 m).
  - Aralar, its most known peak being Txindoki (1,346 m)

== Nature ==
The range is almost entirely limestone, but other materials can be found. The slopes are generally gentle, but there are many limestone peaks and cliffs in which vultures dwell. There is abundant oceanic climate vegetation, like beeches, oaks, birches and other like the Cantabrian Holm Oaks and the Pinus radiata, the last one artificially introduced for plantation.

== See also ==
- Pyrenees
- Cantabrian Range
- Geography of Spain
