= Arbizu =

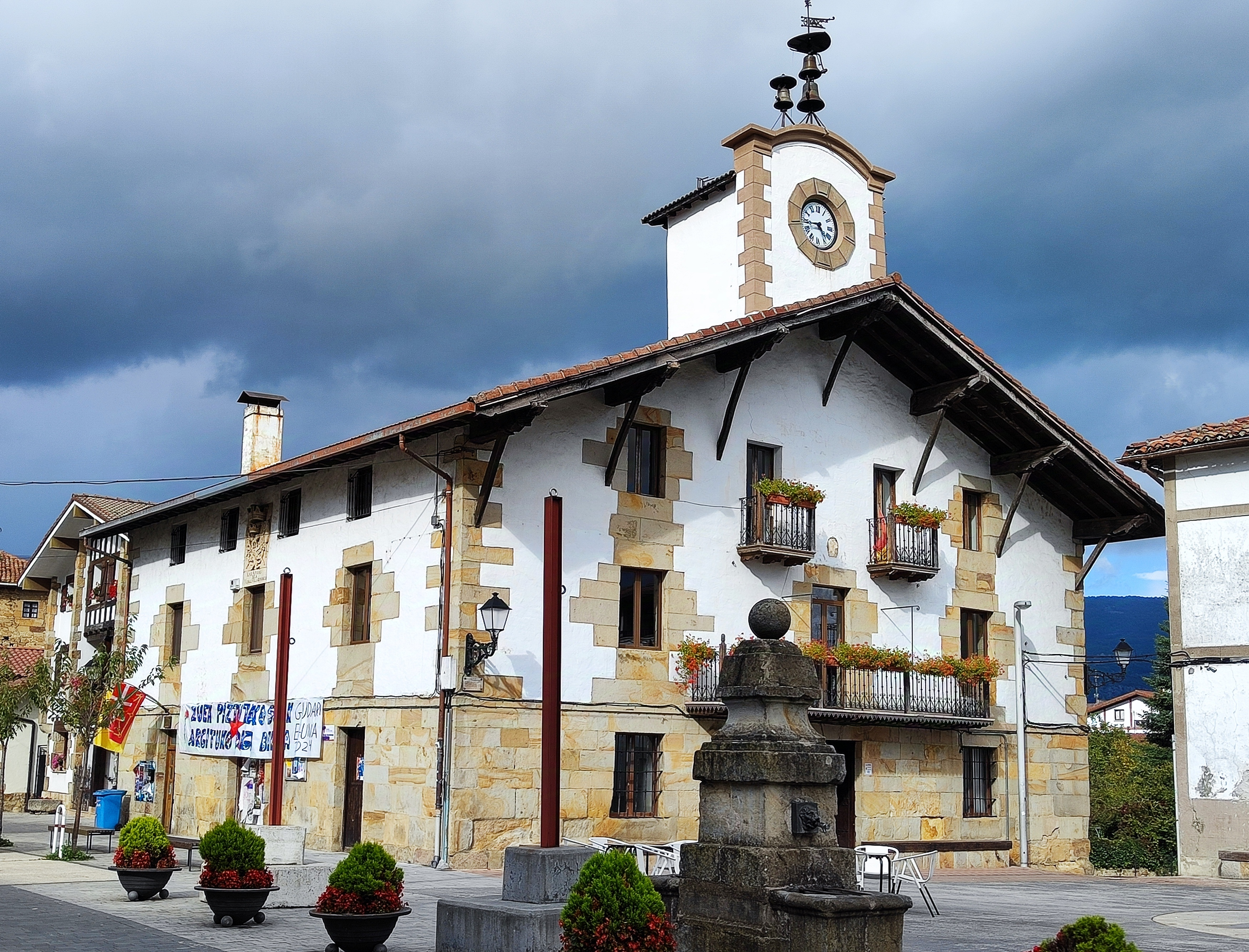
- Town hall

- Coat of arms

- Location of Arbizu within Navarre Location of Arbizu within Spain
- Coordinates: 42°55′N 2°02′W
- Country: Spain
- Autonomous community: Navarra

Government
  - Mayor: Jesús María Mendinueta Urdanoz

Area
  - Total: 14 km^{2} (5.4 sq mi)
- Elevation: 497 m (1,631 ft)

Population (2025-01-01)
  - Total: 1,107
  - Density: 79/km^{2} (200/sq mi)
- Time zone: UTC+1 (CET)
  - Summer (DST): UTC+2 (CEST)
- Postal code: 31839

Arbizu is a village and municipality in the province and autonomous community of Navarre, northern Spain, neighbouring Etxarri-Aranatz. Its traditional "fiesta" falls on June 24, St. John's day, and is noted for the feast held in the main square.
