= Arakil =

Town and municipality in northern Spain

Coordinates: 42.917°N 1.861°W

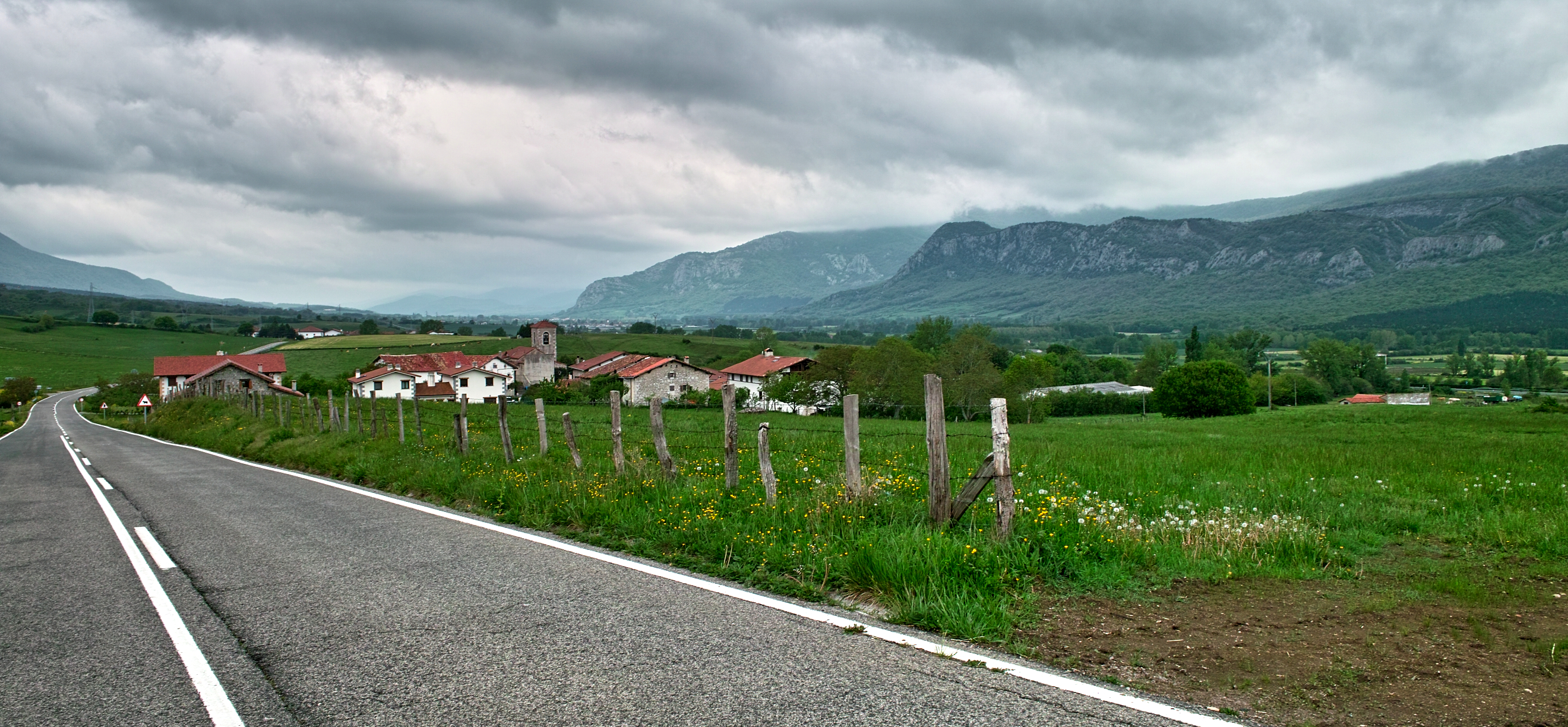
View of the village of Zuhatzu in Arakil

Arakil's coat of arms

Arakil is a town and municipality located in the province and autonomous community of Navarre, northern Spain.
