= Amezketa =

- Municipality
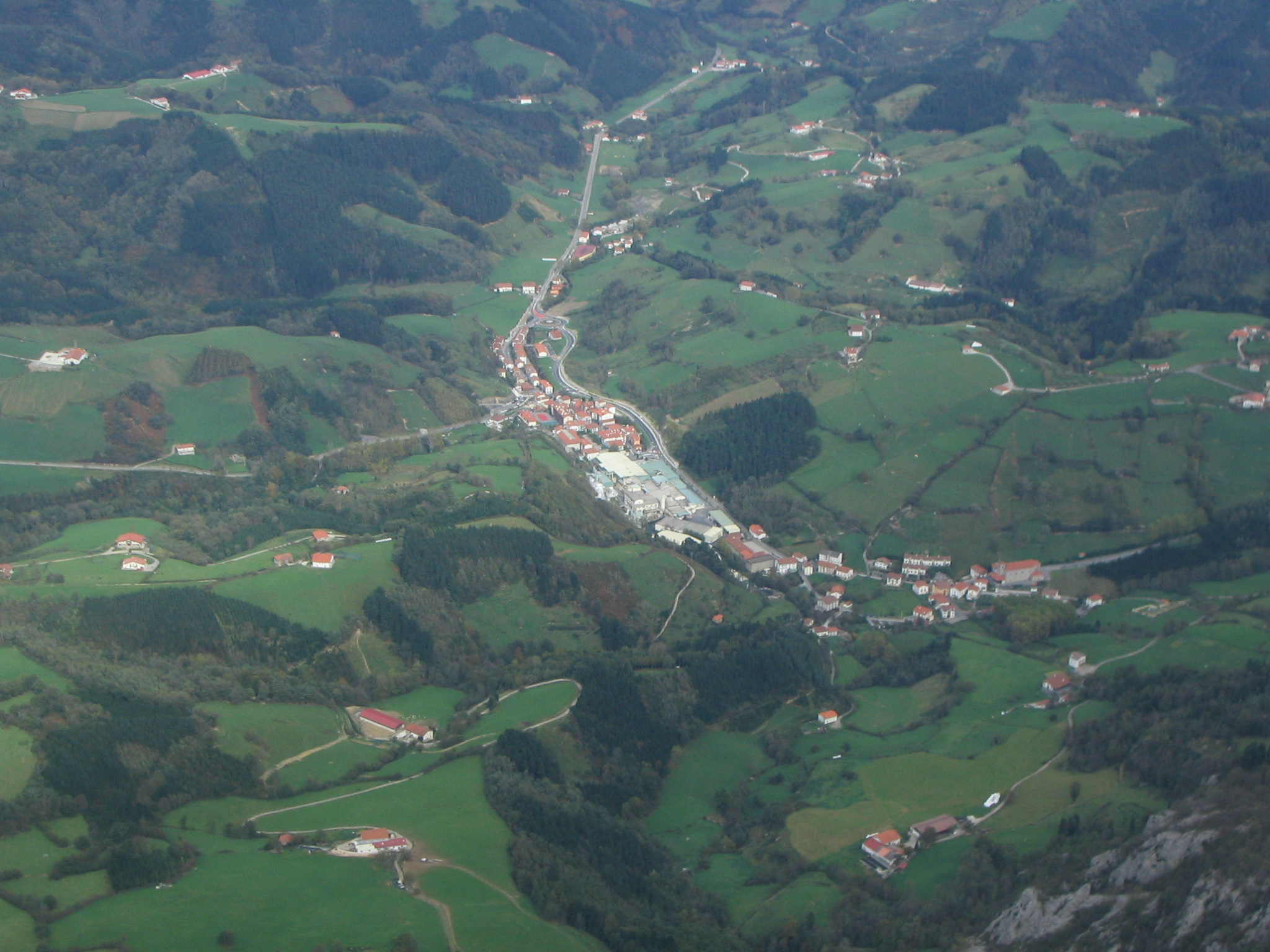

- Coat of arms

- Location of Hondarribia within the Basque Autonomous Community Amezketa (Spain)
- Coordinates: 43°2′57″N 2°5′17″W
- Country: Spain
- Autonomous community: Basque Country
- Province: Gipuzkoa
- Comarca: Tolosaldea

Population (2025-01-01)
  - Total: 956
- Time zone: UTC+1 (CET)
  - Summer (DST): UTC+2 (CEST)

Amezketa (Spanish Amézqueta) is a town located in the province of Gipuzkoa, in the Basque Autonomous Community, in the North of Spain. It is located at the foot of Txindoki.
