= Valdecebollas =

Mountain in Spain

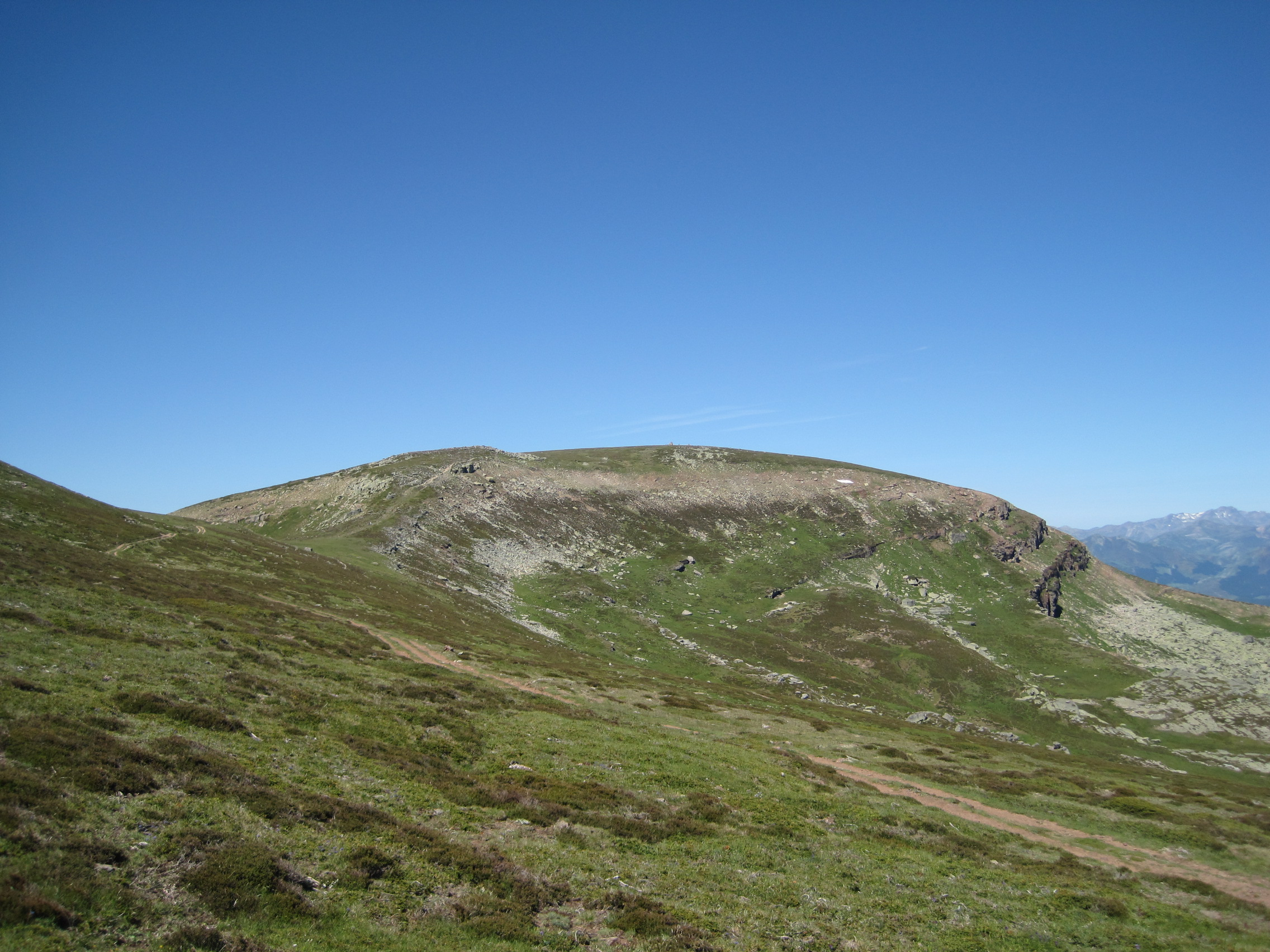

Highest point
- Elevation: 2139 m
- Prominence: 292 m
- Coordinates: 42.966389°N 4.364722°W

Geography
- Location: Spain
- Parent range: Cantabrian Mountains

Geology
- Mountain type: Stone

The Valdecebollas Peak (2144 m a.s.l.) is an elevation of the Montaña Palentina, in the foothills of the Cantabrian mountain range (Spain), in the orographic knot of La Cebollera, or massif of Valdecebollas. This massif forms a buttress to the south of the Sierra de Híjar, also known on this southern slope as "Sierra de Peña Labra", as this summit is the most characteristic from this perspective.

At the top is the so-called "Torreón", a small cylindrical stepped stone tower, with a plaque, a summit book, and a triangulation station. Since 1965, a mass has been held at this point on the first Sunday in August, organized by the residents of Barruelo and Brañosera, and attended by mountaineers from Campoo and La Pernía.

== Location ==
It is located next to the town of Brañosera, in the eastern part of Montaña Palentina Natural Park, about 20 km from Aguilar de Campoo and the Cantabria-Meseta highway. Its exact location is 42.966389°N 4.364722°W, and marks the eastern boundary of the Montaña Palentina.

== Ascent ==
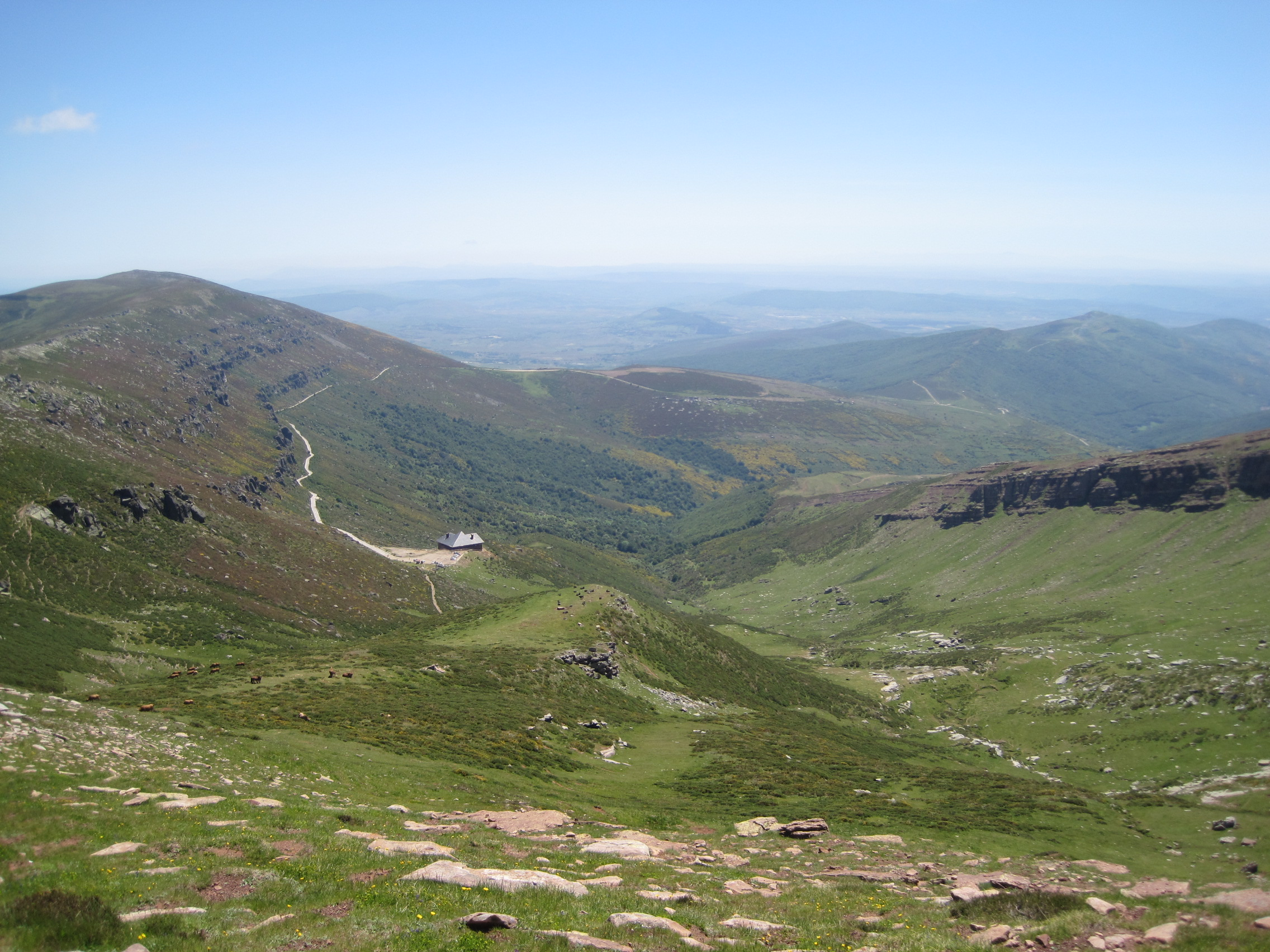
View of El Golobar refuge from the Valdecebollas.

The most common route for the ascent to Valdecebollas is from the town of Brañosera, from where you can access by car to El Golobar (1840 m), and from there on foot, through the pass of Sel de la Fuente, to the triangulation station of Valdecebollas, which marks 2139 m. From its peak you can see the Sierra de Peña Labra and the great elevations of Fuentes Carrionas.

== Features ==
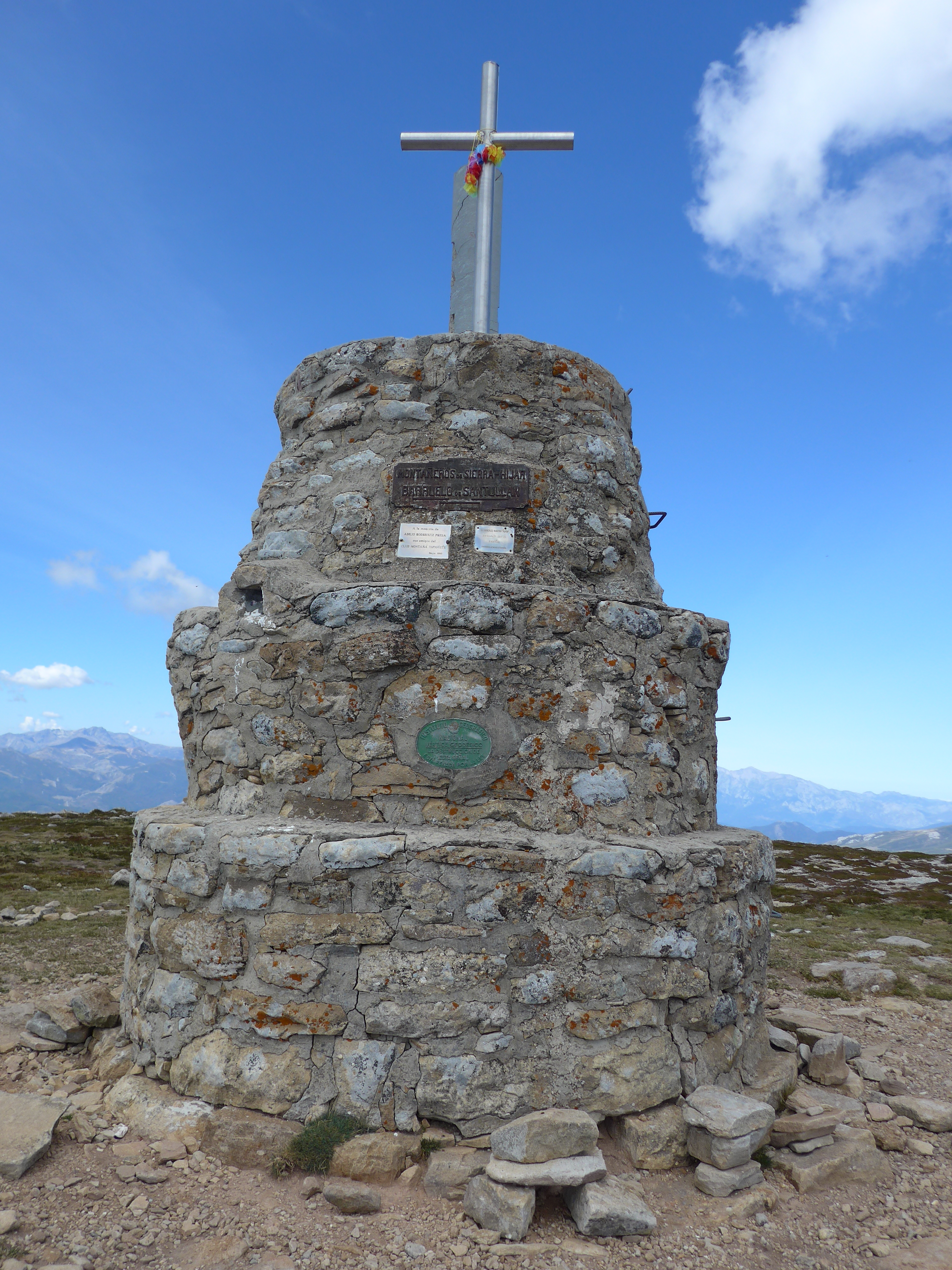
Tower of Valdecebollas. It is a small cylindrical and stepped stone tower, with a plaque, a summit book, and a triangulation station. A mass has been held next to the tower since 1965 on the first Sunday in August, organized by the residents of Barruelo and Brañosera, and attended by mountaineers from Campoo and La Pernía.

Valdecebollas closes the northern slope of the glacier cirque of Covarrés, which is the source of the Pisuerga River. In this glacier basin, the waters disappear in the sinkhole of Sel de la Fuente, to resurface three kilometers below in the Cueva del Cobre, near Santa María de Redondo. From this locality it is also possible to make the ascent, but it is much longer.

The vegetation of this mountain is mainly heather and Mantisalca, and from its slopes you can see beech and oak forests. In winter the snowfalls are abundant, and important ice cascades are usually formed on its slopes.

== See also ==
- El Golobar
- Rubagón
