= El Golobar =

Mountain pass in Palencia, Spain

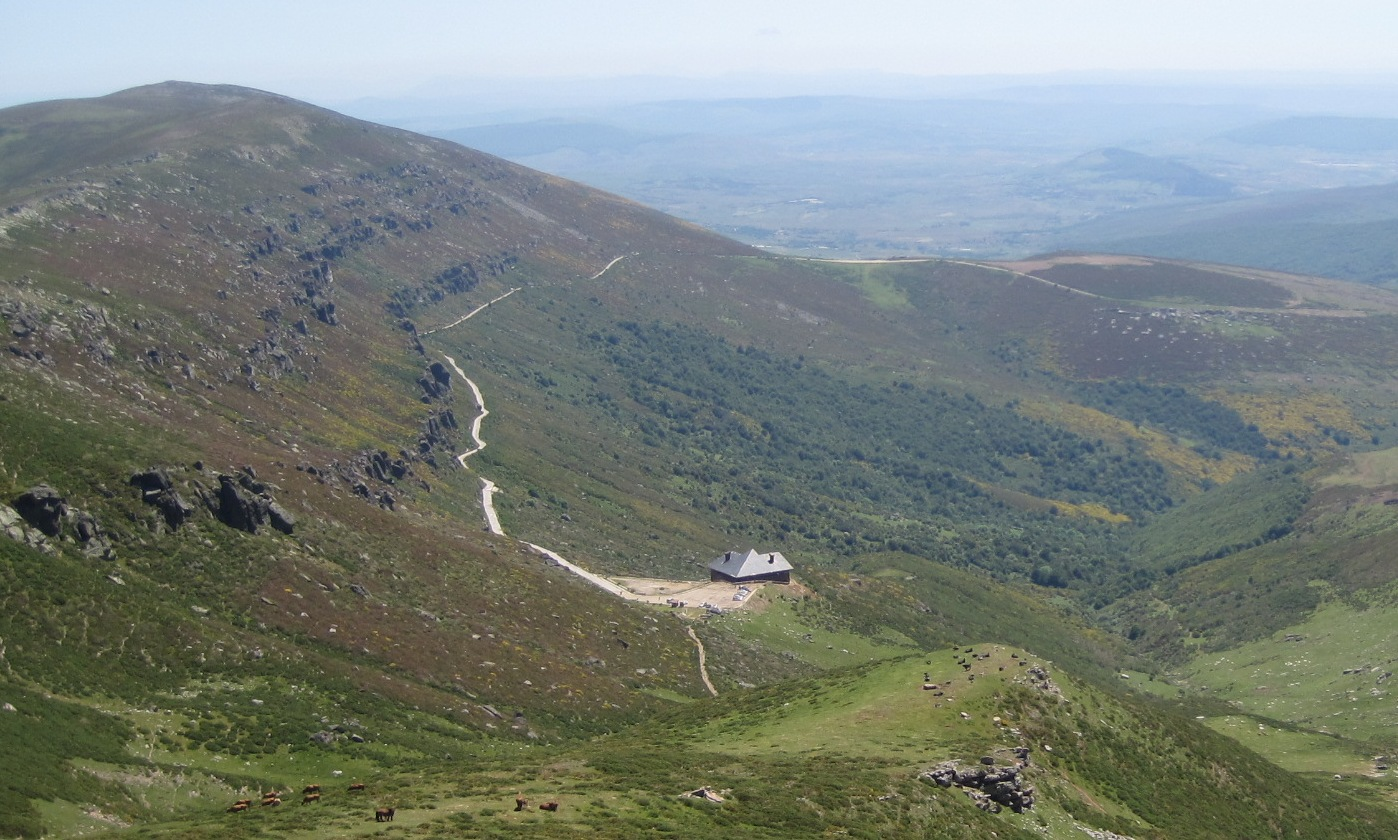
- View of the road and the Golobar refuge from El Sestil.

Highest point
- Elevation: 1,840 m (6,040 ft)
- Coordinates: 42°58′02″N 04°20′13″W

Geography
- Location within Spain

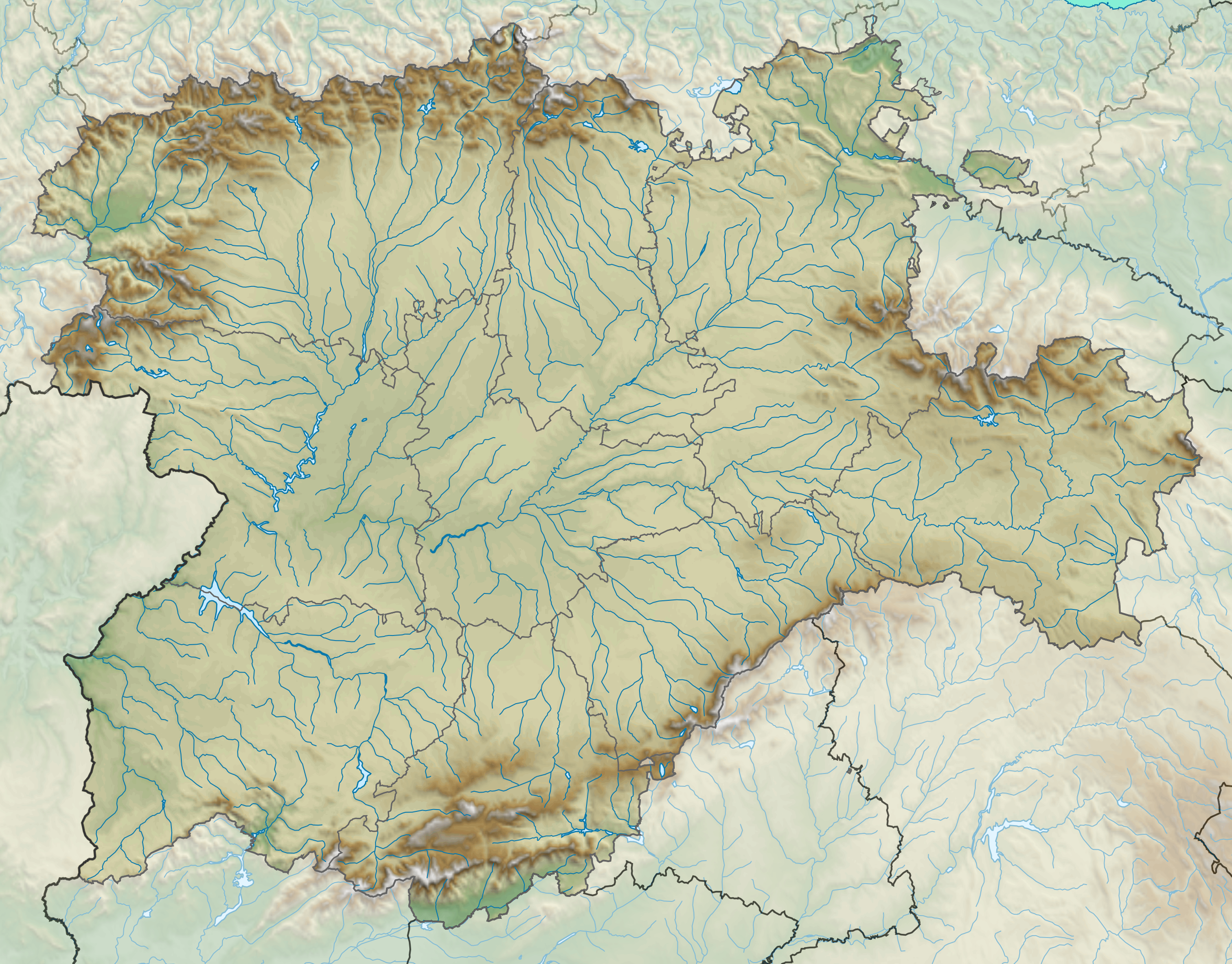
- North of Palencia
- Country: Spain
- Region: Iberian Peninsula
- Range coordinates: 42°58′02″N 04°20′13″W
- Parent range: Cantabrian Mountains

Climbing
- Access: Brañosera

El Golobar is a mountain spot located in the north of the province of Palencia, Spain. It is located in a region of great ecological richness, the Montaña Palentina, in the municipality of Brañosera, the oldest municipality in Spain.

At the end of the 1960s, there were plans to build a ski resort in the vicinity, and several ski lifts and a large building at the top of the mountain to be used as a Parador de Turismo, but the project was stopped and the facilities were abandoned.

The road that gives access to the enclave reaches 1840 m.a.s.l. and is the highest in the province. From the parking lot, you can easily reach the peaks of Valdecebollas and Sestil, as well as other important points of the Sierra de Híjar, such as Sel de la Fuente, where the Pisuerga River rises.

== Access ==
The road that ascends to Golobar starts from the PP-2204 that joins Brañosera with Reinosa, in Cantabria (from the Cantabrian limit it is called CA-280) going up the Sierra de Híjar. Shortly before reaching Salcedillo, take a detour to the left where the road begins, called PP-2203, and which after 6.5 km reaches the mountain refuge.

== History ==
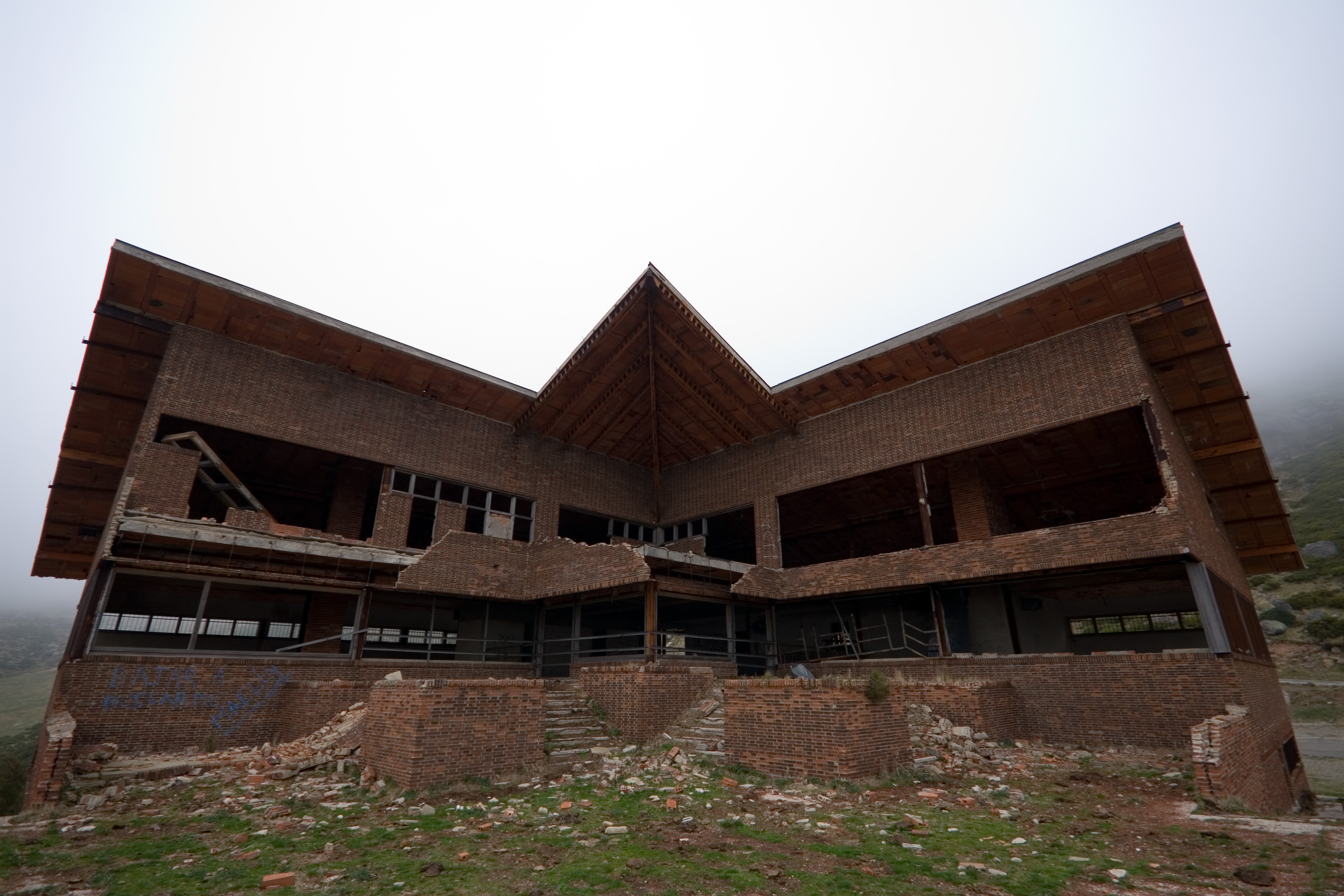
Abandoned building used as a Parador de Turismo at the top of Golobar, in an advanced state of deterioration. It is owned by the Provincial Council de Palencia, although the town council of Brañosera has requested its transfer.

The history of Golobar is linked to the ski resort project that the Provincial Council of Palencia carried out in that place at the end of the 1960s, which also included the construction of a Parador de Turismo at its summit. The tourist boom in mountain sports, backed by the success of the nearby Alto Campoo ski resort, led to the idea of locating the facility in this privileged environment. After the completion of the road leading to the parador, whose construction was practically finished on an esplanade in front of a spectacular valley, the first ski lifts were built a few kilometers below and close to a large parking lot with a capacity for 250 vehicles. In 1973, the economic crisis shook the budgets, and the works, which were very close to completion, were left unfinished and abandoned. Since then, the facilities have suffered progressive deterioration: the ski lifts were removed because of the risk they posed and the hotel building was first used as a shelter and then as a livestock corral, which is the use it is currently assigned. The access road lacks maintenance and has suffered some landslides in recent years.

In 2016, a project was presented to recover the building, transforming it into a high-performance sports center, which in 2017 was transferred to the Ministry of Education and Vocational Training.

== Use ==
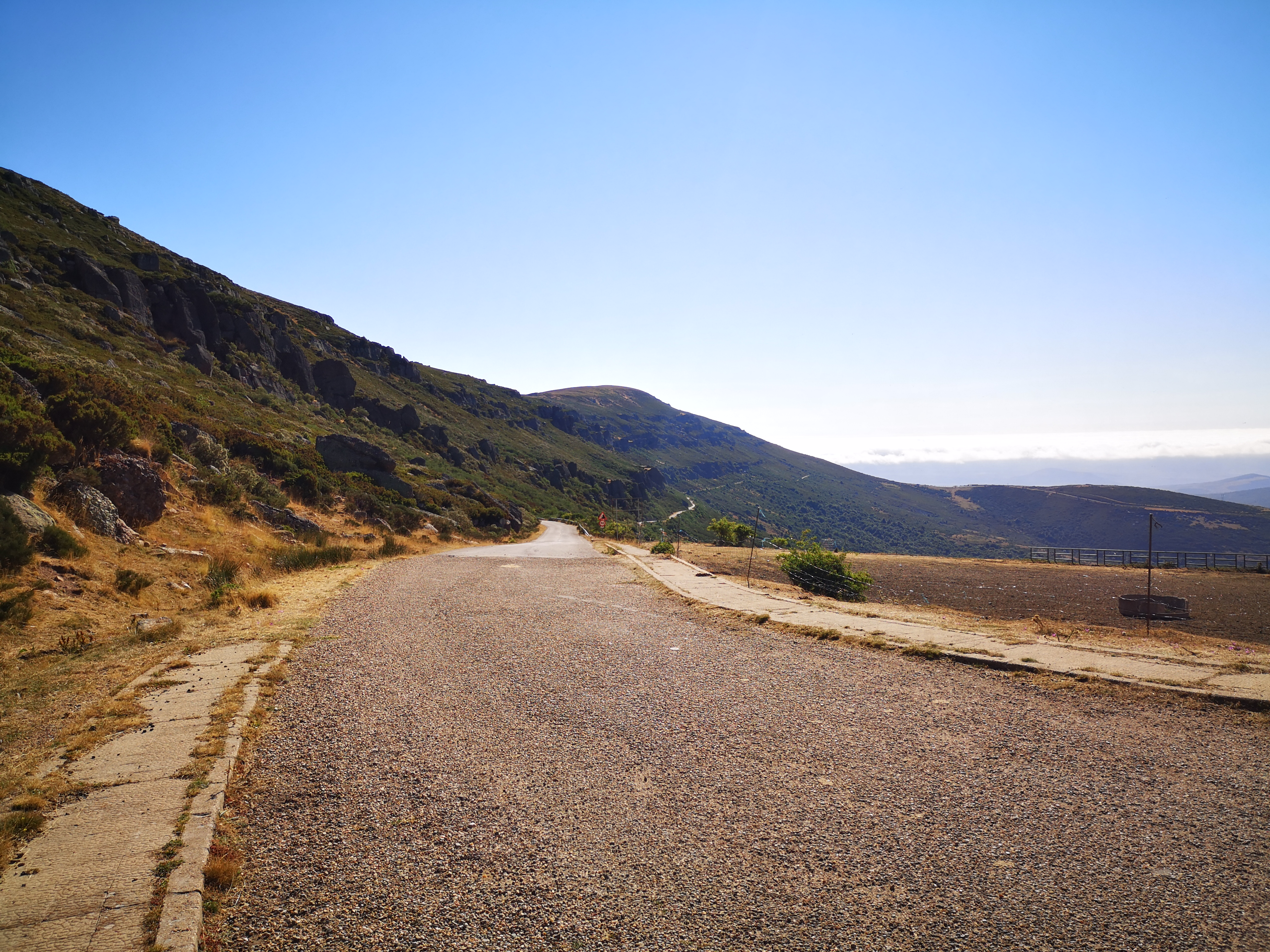
Aspect of the last meters of the road up to Golobar.

The privileged location of Golobar has turned its surroundings into an ideal place for various sports, especially skiing, hiking from its summit and cycling. It is the starting point for routes through the most visited places in the area, such as Valdecebollas, El Sestil, Sel de la Fuente, Covarrés and Fuente del Cobre. It also provides privileged views over the valley of Santullán and the Somahoz hill. The most important cycling competitions that take place in El Golobar are the Vuelta a Castilla y León, which included a stage finish in its 2008 edition with a victory for Alberto Contador, and the Vuelta a Palencia, where it has become its most emblematic stage.
