= Rubagón =

Watercourse of the Ibereian Peninsula, a tributary of the Camesa River

Coordinates: 42°49′21″N 4°12′10″W

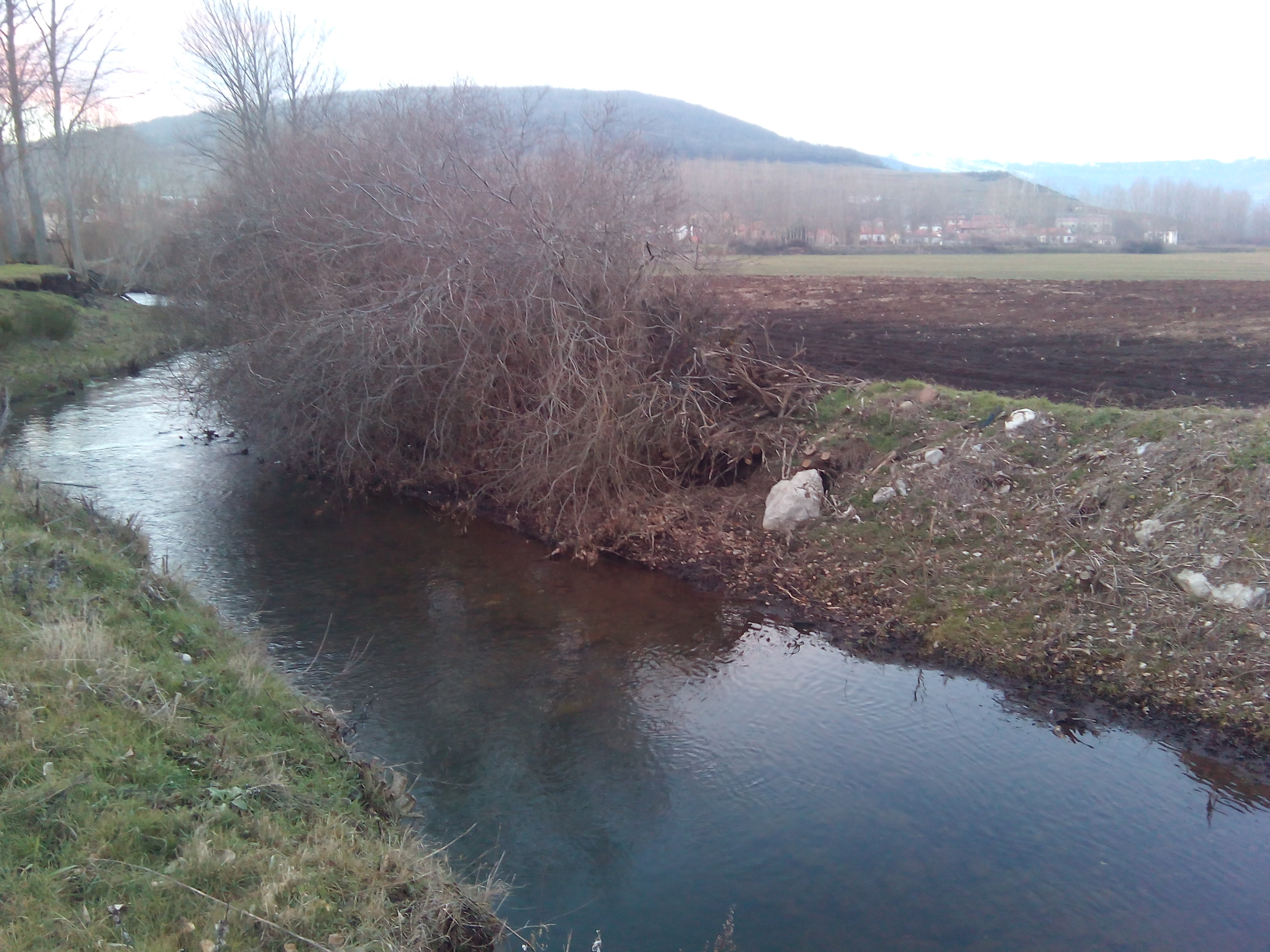
- Part of: Pisuerga
- Primary inflows: Sierra de Híjar
- Primary outflows: Camesa River
- Basin countries: Spain
- Settlements: Palencia

The Rubagón is a river that runs entirely through the province of Palencia, in the eastern part of the Montaña Palentina, in Spain.

== Route ==
The Rubagón rises in the Sierra de Híjar, between the peaks of El Cueto and Valdecebollas, and flows through the towns of Brañosera, Barruelo de Santullán, Porquera de Santullán, Cillamayor, Villavega de Aguilar and Nestar, before it dilutes into the Camesa near Quintanilla de las Torres.

It is rich in trout, and is catalogued as a fishing preserve between its source and the town of Barruelo de Santullán.

== Etymology ==
Rubag is a word of Celtic origin meaning "red", so its name is attributed to the color of its waters, which flow through a terrain with a high content of iron ore, and in the thawing season or after heavy rains give this color to the river.

== History ==
It is estimated that the Rubagón basin has been habitually populated since the Iron Age, being included in the territory of Cantabria conquered by the Roman legions during the Cantabrian wars. Subsequently, it was one of the first areas to be repopulated from the third century onwards, Brañosera being considered the first town council in Spain. In the 19th century, the first coal deposits of the Palencia mining basin were discovered in the Rubagón basin, between Barruelo and Orbó, which marked the economy and demography of the area.
