= Sierra de Híjar =

Spanish mountain range

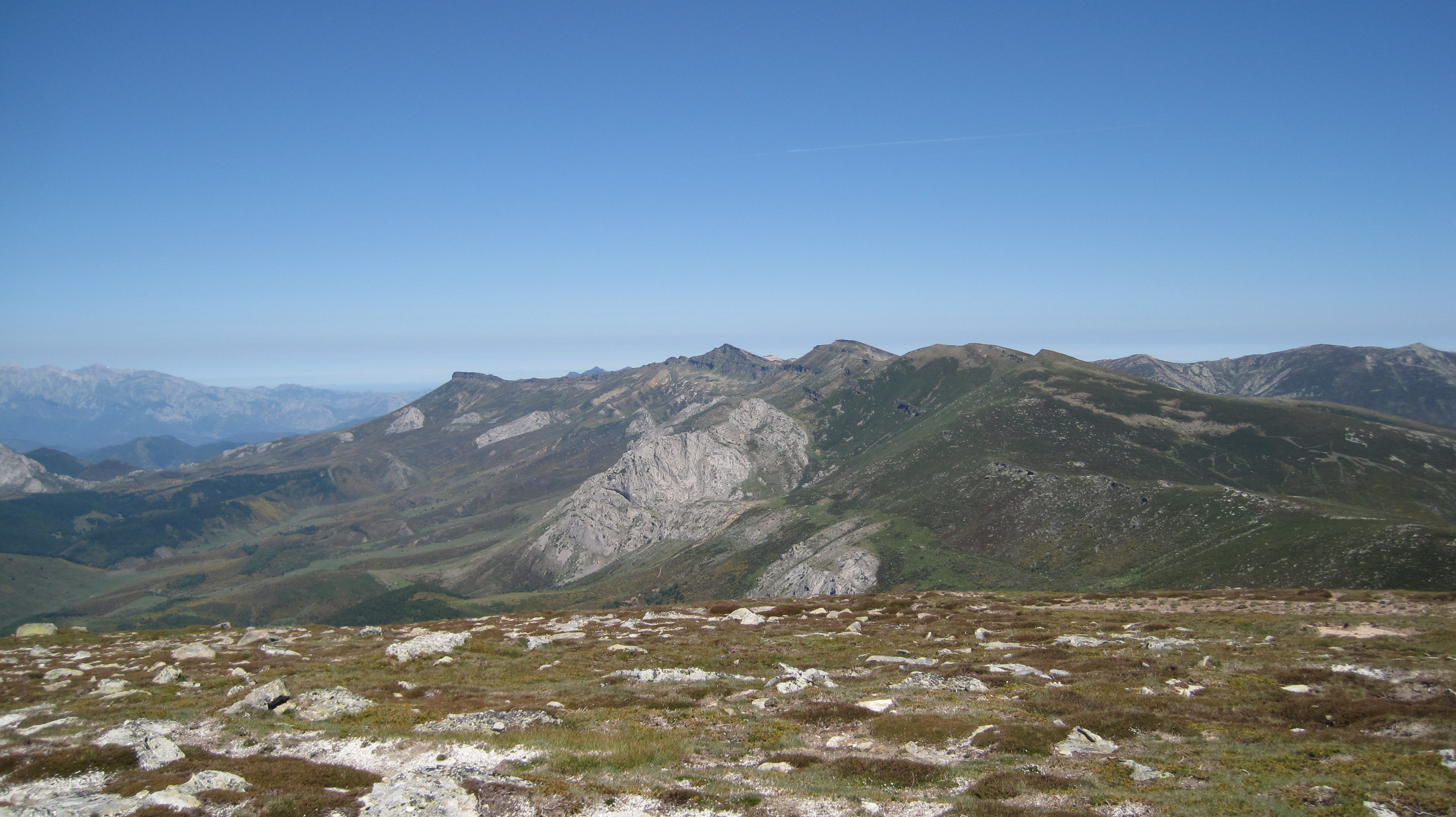
- The Sierra de Híjar range, viewed from Valdecebollas. In the foreground, the peaks of Peña Labra, Tres Mares, and Cuchillón are visible. In the background, Peña Agujas, Cueva del Cobre, and the Picos de Europa.

Highest point
- Peak: Cuchillón
- Elevation: 2,179–2,222 metres (7,149–7,290 ft)

Dimensions
- Length: 24 km (15 mi) NNW
- Area: 0.16 km^{2} (0.062 mi^{2})

Geography
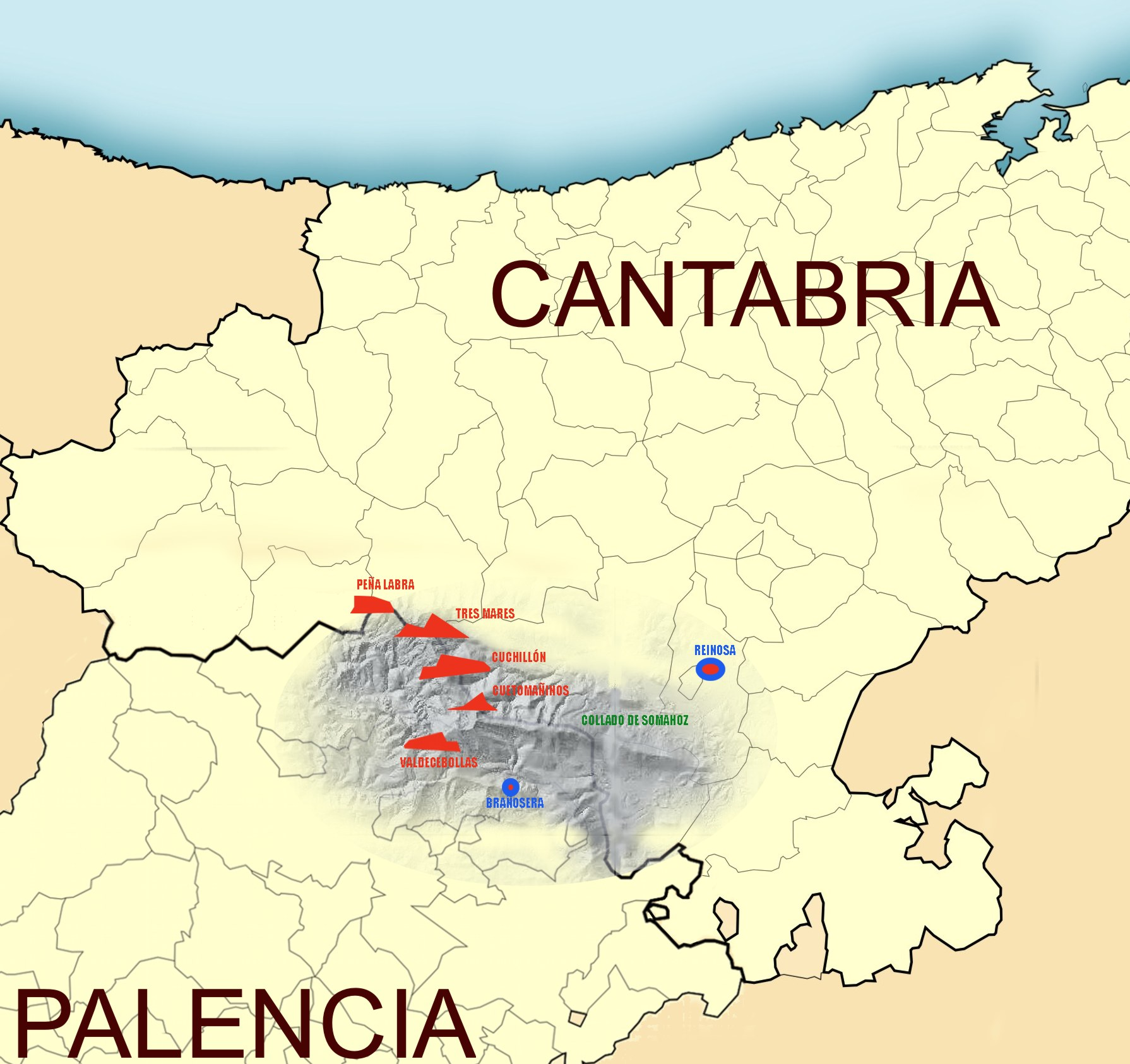
- Location of the Sierra de Híjar
- Country: Spain
- Provinces/Communities: Palencia and Cantabria
- Parent range: Cantabrian Mountains

The Sierra de Híjar is a mountain range of the Cantabrian Mountains System, located in the Province of Palencia and the Autonomous Community of Cantabria in northern Spain.

== Geography ==
The range is 24 kilometres (15 mi) long, and runs in a west-northwest to east-southeast direction. The highest peaks in the range are concentrated in the 18 kilometres (11 mi) northeastern to central section. From there the altitude declines. The rangehas a maximum width of 5,200 metres (3.2 mi), between Penaguda and Sel de la Fuente.

The range's highest point is at the peak of Cuchillón, although its exact altitude differs by source, including: 2,174 metres (7,133 ft) according to the National Geographic Institute of Spain (Instituto Geográfico Nacional); and 2,222 metres (7,290 ft) according to Francisco Hernández-Pacheco and in other publications by the same National Geographic Institute.

This system marks the boundary between the regions of Campoo in Cantabria and La Pernia in Palencia of Castile and León. It is one of the southernmost foothills of the Cantabrian Mountains range, and the last to rise over 2,000 metres (6,600 ft) in elevation.

=== Main peaks ===
The highest points are concentrated in the central sector, including Tres Mares and Cueto Manin. The northwestern sector contains the long spine of Peña Labra and an access point to the summit from Polaciones. The southeastern sector, extending from Sestil to Alto de Hoyos, is the lowest and is called the Cinto Brotherhood.

Main heights, northwest to southeast.
Name, altitude	Coordinates	Notes
Peña Labra, 2029 m	43°02′44″N 4°25′55″W	At this peak there is a triangulation station of the first order. It ends a characteristic plateau, which joins the Fuente del Chivo with a 2000 meter boundary.
Tres Mares, 2171 m	43°02′16″N 4°24′14″W	There is a terrace at the top that acts as a great viewpoint.
Las Hoyas, 2106 m	43°01′50″N 4°23′39″W	
Cuchillón, 2174–2222 m	43°01′36″N 4°23′27″W	Highest point in the range. It is also referred to as "Canchal de la Muela" and "Peña del Pando", or "Rock of Pando", due to the summit's flat shape.
Cotomañinos o Guzmerones, 2144 m	43°00′35″N 4°22′42″W	This point and the previous point form the glacial basin of Hoyo Sacro and Guzmerones.
Cueto Mañín, 2122 m	43°00′19″N 4°22′28″W	Peña de las Agujas rises in this point's southern slope.
Valdecebollas, 2143 m	42°58′00″N 4°21′54″W	A ridge to the south of the range's main line.
Sestil, 2065 m	42°58′20″N 4°20′53″W	Between this point and Cueto Manin lies Sel de la Fuente.
Peña Rubia, 1937 m	42°57′58″N 4°18′00″W	Forms the long crest that births Camesa.
Cuesta Labra, 1951 m	42°58′00″N 4°16′55″W	On its north side are the glacial basins of Bucer and Vitor. It binds to the east with Peña Ensillada towards Somahoz.

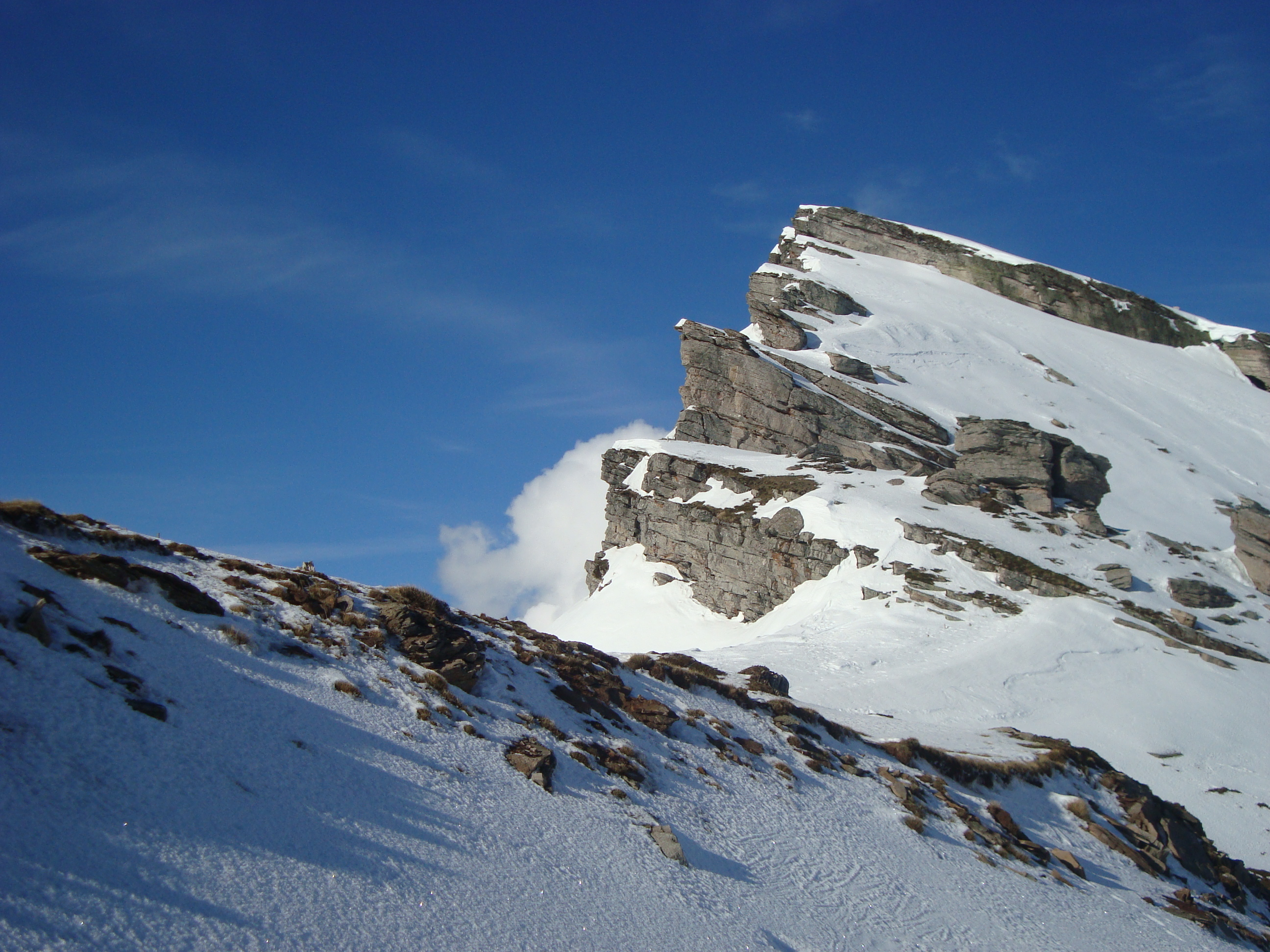
Tres Mares is one of the more famous peaks in the range

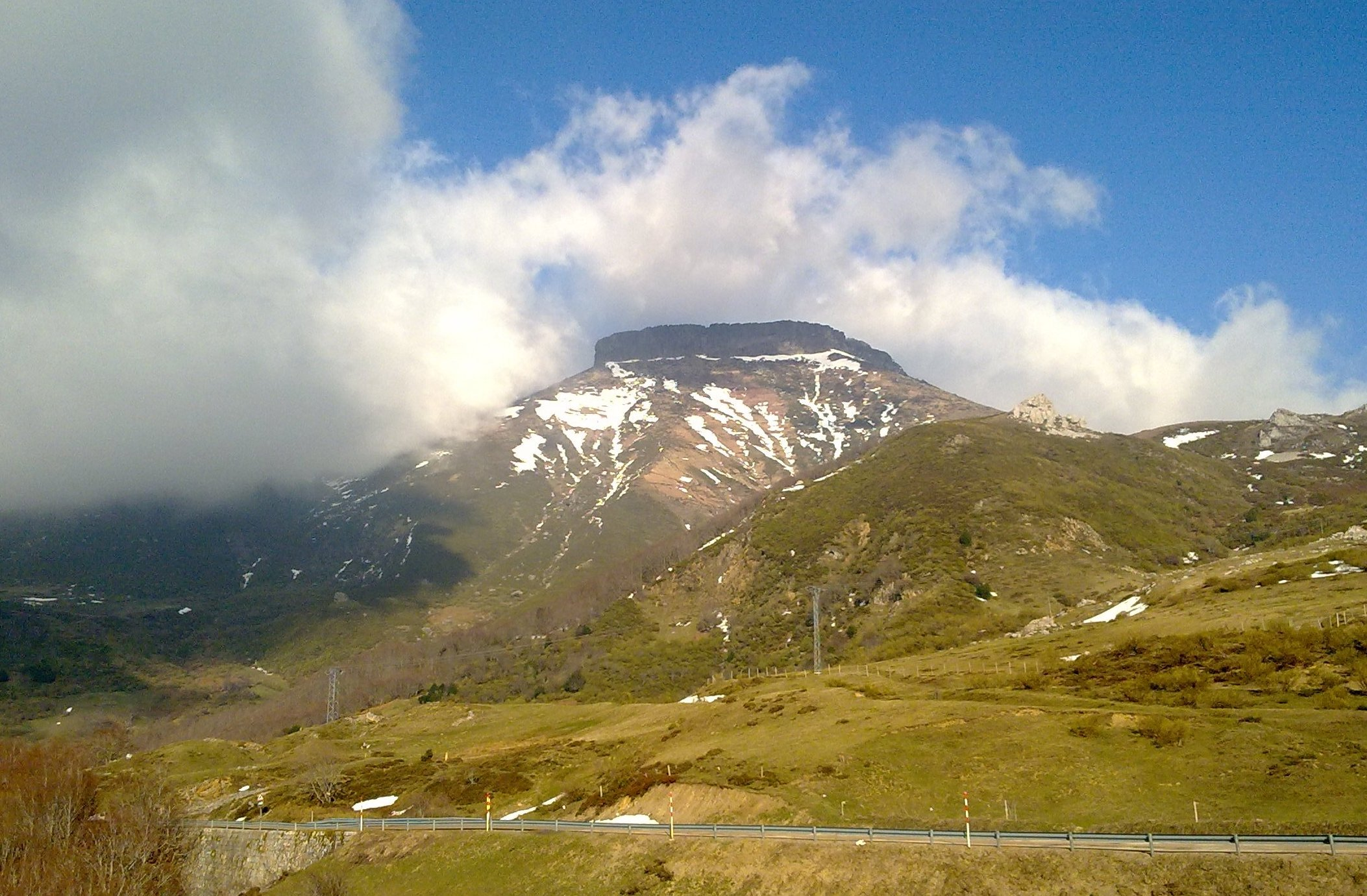
Peña Labra, one of the prominent peaks of the range

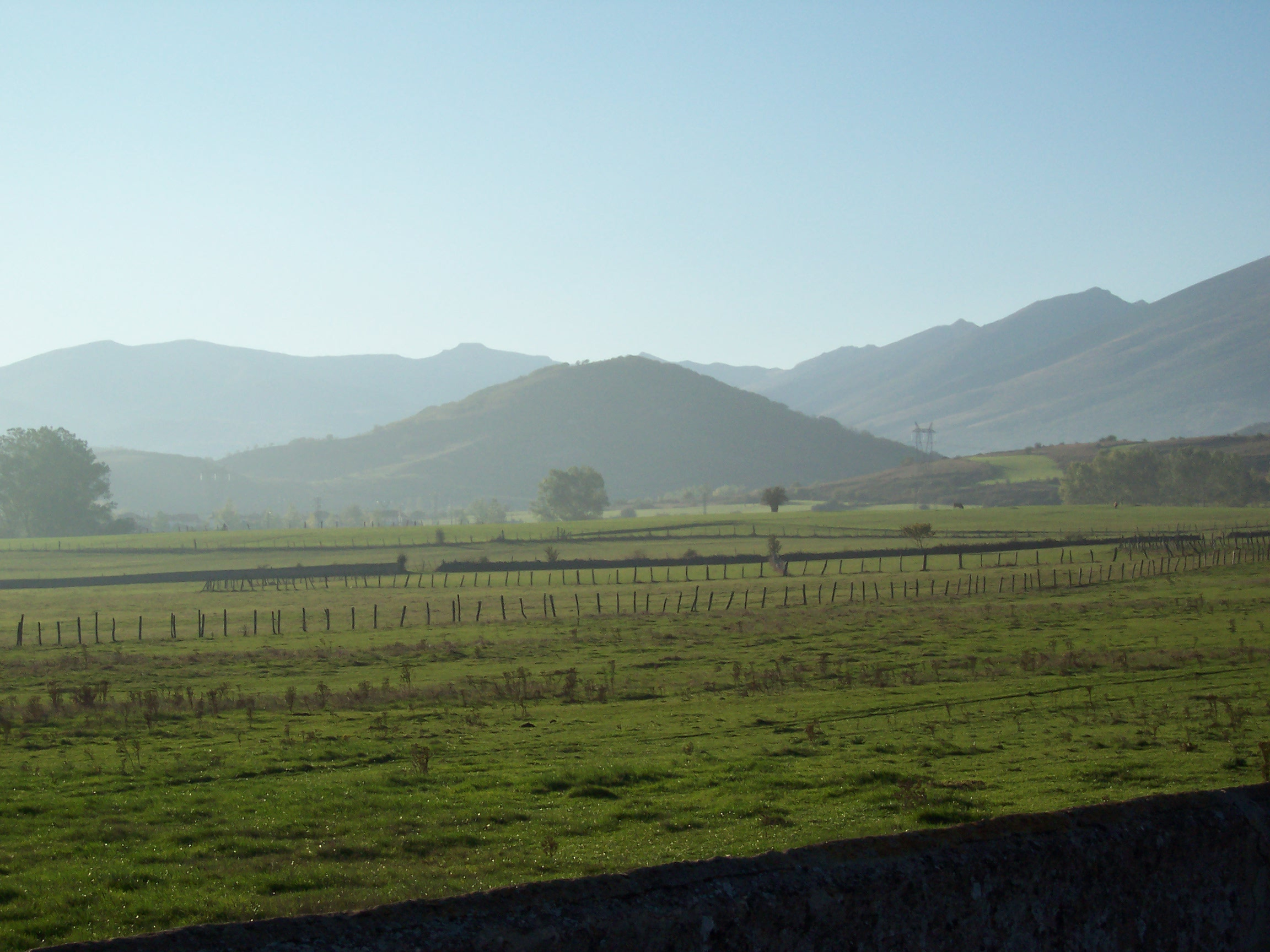
Sierra de Híjar (right) from Reinosa

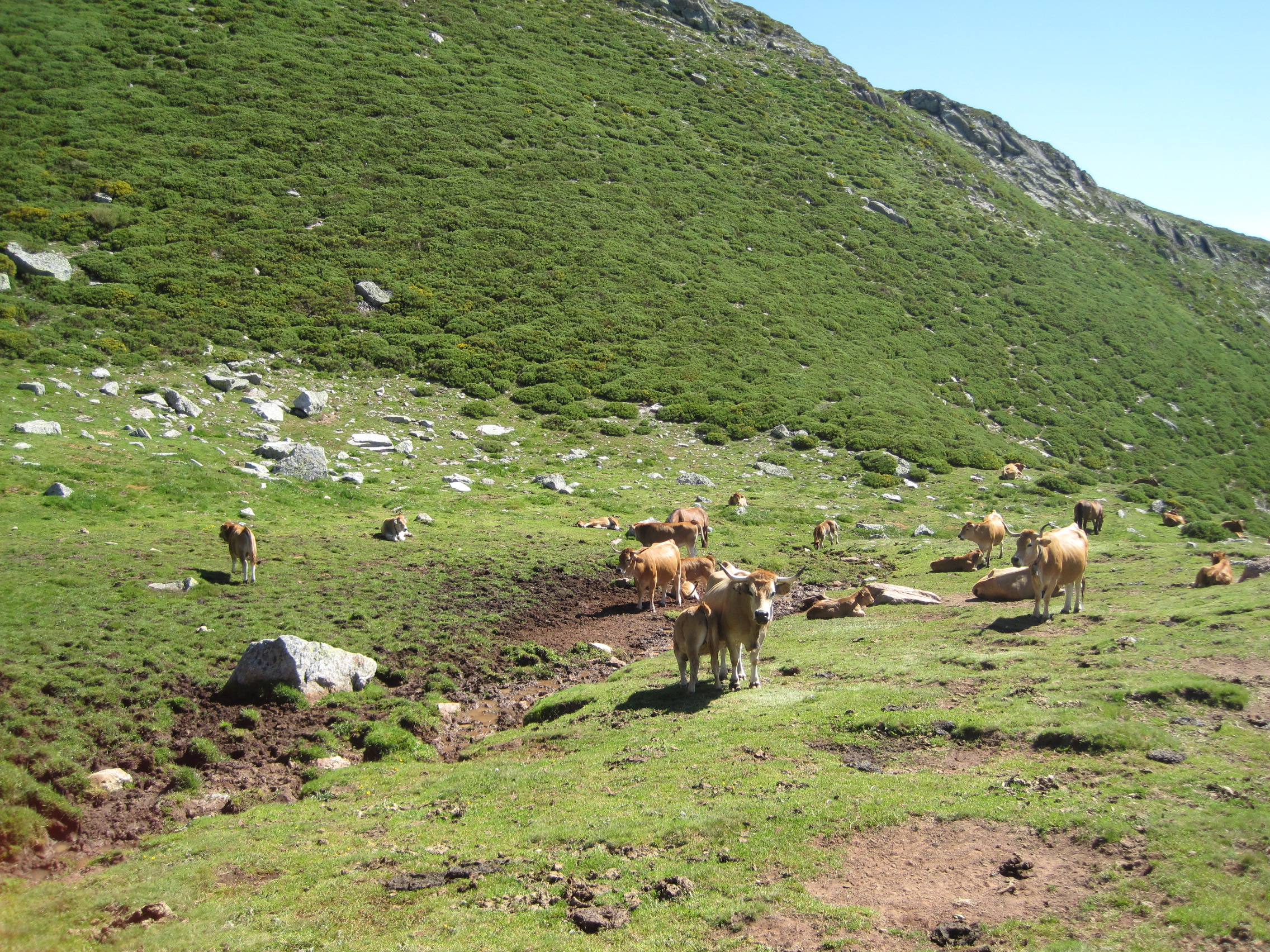
Cows on brañas of Sestil

== Toponymy ==
According to cartographic studies by the National Geographic Institute of Spain and other works, the name "Peña Labra" is often used to refer to this system, especially as seen from the south side. From this perspective, the top of Peña Labra appears most prominently, though it is not the highest in the system. However, all previously existing mapping, including the first series of the National Geographic Institute, or those of Francisco Coello and Quesada and Pascual Madoz, refers to this mountain as "Sierra de Híjar."

== See also ==
- Rubagón
