= Camesa =

River in northern Spain

Coordinates: 42.76036°N 4.25366°W

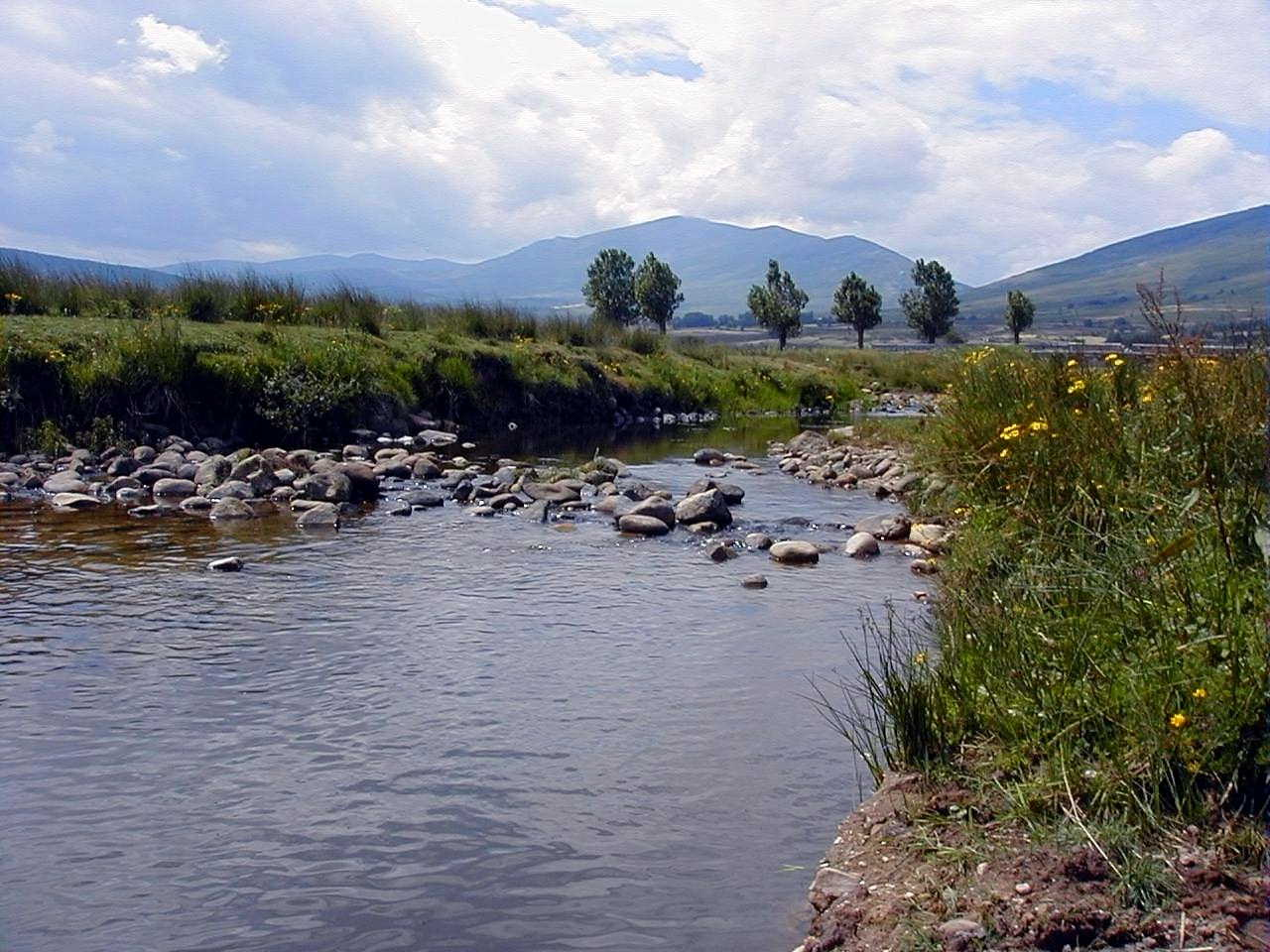
Camesa River as it runs through Santa Olalla (Valdeolea)

The Camesa is a river located in the north of Spain, a tributary of the Pisuerga.

It rises in the province of Palencia in the municipio of Brañosera. It runs briefly through the region of Cantabria, where gives its name to a Site of Community Importance. After passing through the village of Mataporquera, it leaves Cantabria, joining the river Pisuerga in the vicinity of Aguilar de Campoo, again in Palencia.
