= Castro Valnera =

Coordinates: 43°09′02″N 3°39′10″W

- Castru Valnera
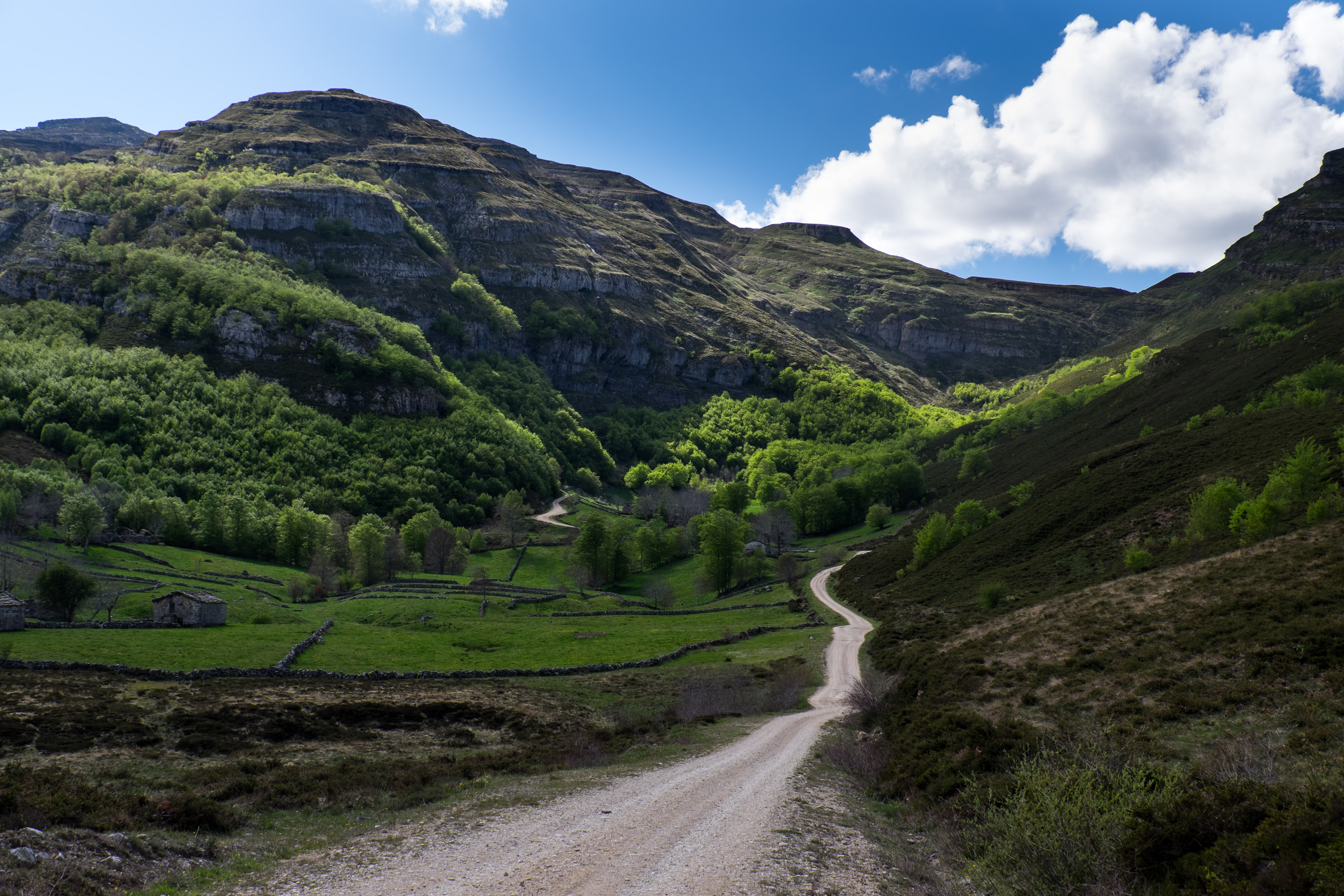
- Castro Valnera peak in 2017

Highest point
- Elevation: 1,718 m (5,636 ft)
- Prominence: 866 m (2,841 ft)

Geography
- Location: Burgos and Cantabria, Spain
- Parent range: Montes de Lunada
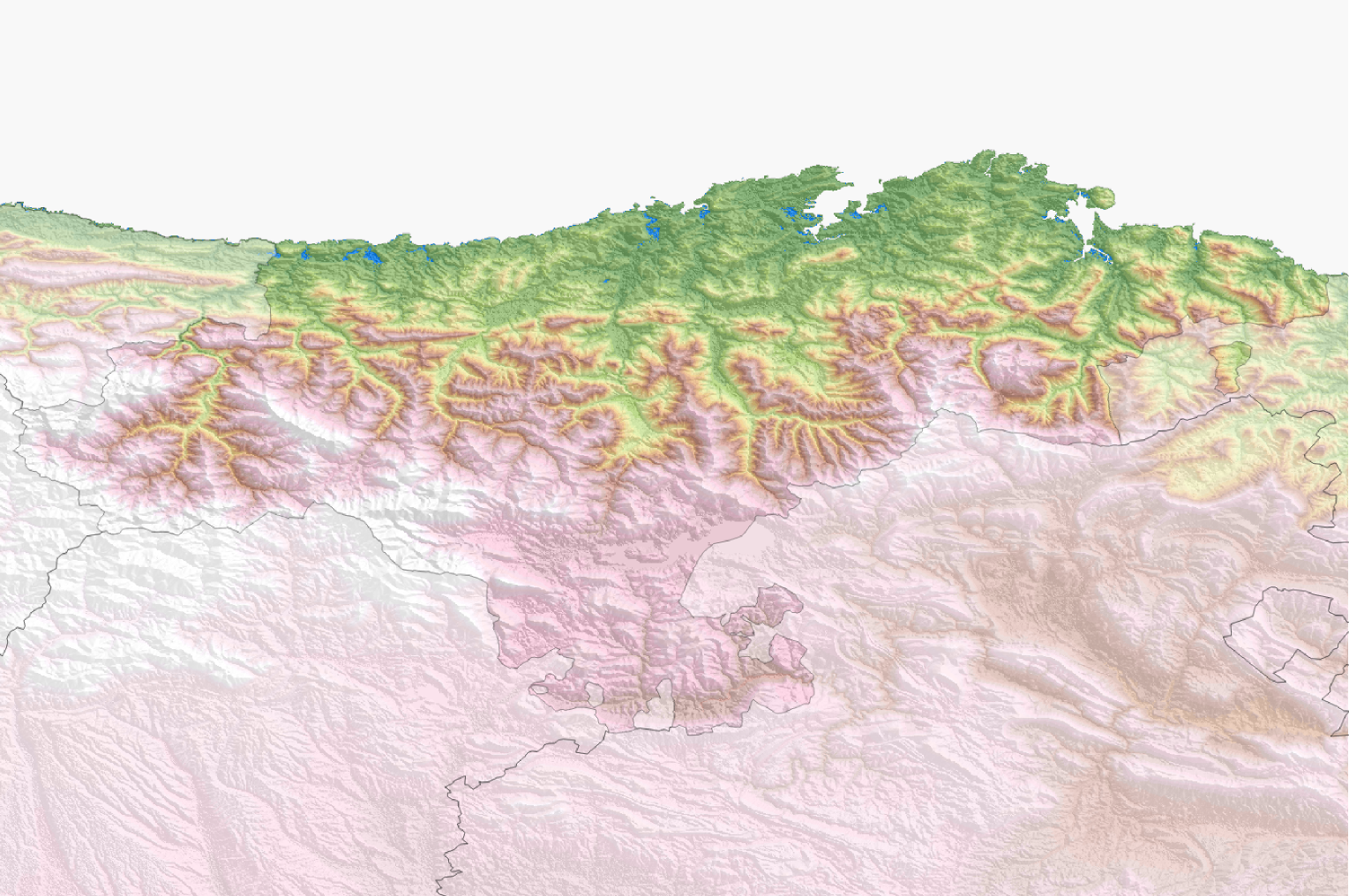
- Topo map

Castro Valnera (Spanish) or Castru Valnera (Cantabrian) is a peak located in the central area of the Cantabrian Mountains, in the border between the province of Burgos and Cantabria, northern Spain. It is around it that the whole Pas valley revolves, and also the source of the Miera River, between the Portillo de Lunada and Estacas de Trueba passes.

Castru in Cantabrian refers to an abrupt rocky peak.
