= Peña Labra =

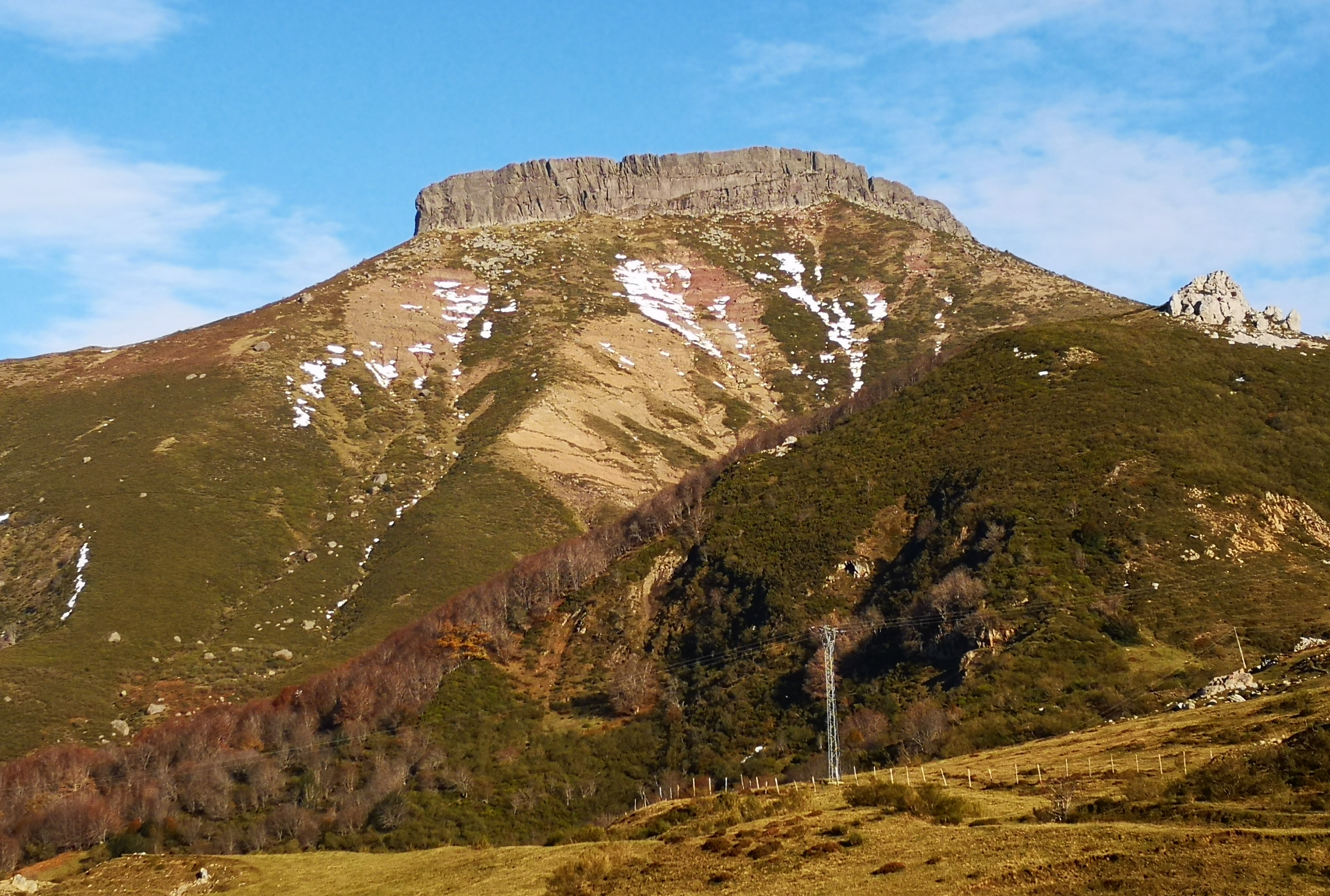
- Peña Labra viewed from Piedrasluengas

Highest point
- Elevation: 2,018 m (6,621 ft)
- Prominence: 77 m.
- Coordinates: 43°2′52.080″N 4°25′55.992″W

Geography
- Location within Spain
- Location: Spain
- Parent range: Sierra de Híjar, Cantabrian Mountains System

Climbing
- Easiest route: SW, from Piedrasluengas

Peña Labra is a 2,018-metre (6,621 ft) high mountain located in the Sierra de Híjar range, a part of the Cantabrian Mountains System. It is located on the boundary between the Province of Palencia and the Autonomous Community of Cantabria.

It is the westernmost peak of the Alto Campoo Massif.

The main trailhead for the mountain is at Pass of Piedrasluengas, located at an elevation of 1,355 metres (4,446 ft), 22 kilometres (14 mi) from Potes in Cantabria and 29 kilometres (18 mi) from Cervera de Pisuerga in Palencia, on the road CL-627.
