= Barruelo de Santullán =

Coordinates: 42°54′N 4°18′W

- municipality
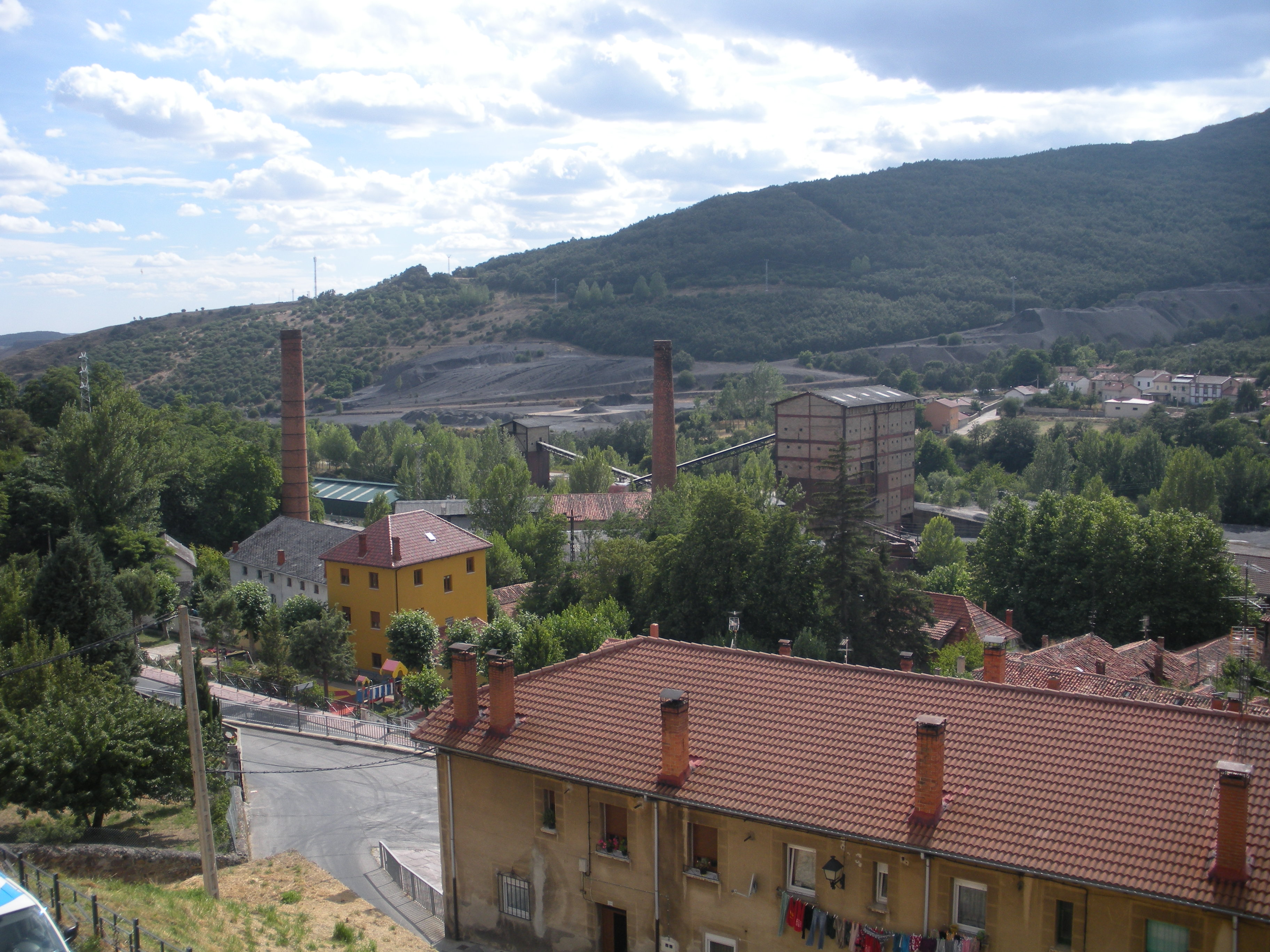
- View from the Centro de Interpretación de la Minería

- Flag Coat of arms
- Interactive map of Barruelo de Santullán
- Country: Spain
- Autonomous community: Castile and León
- Province: Palencia
- Municipality: Barruelo de Santullán

Area
  - Total: 53 km^{2} (20 sq mi)

Population (2025-01-01)
  - Total: 1,164
  - Density: 22/km^{2} (57/sq mi)
- Time zone: UTC+1 (CET)
  - Summer (DST): UTC+2 (CEST)
- Website: Official website

Barruelo de Santullán is a municipality located in the province of Palencia, Castile and León, Spain.

According to the 2004 census (INE), the municipality had a population of 1,592 inhabitants.

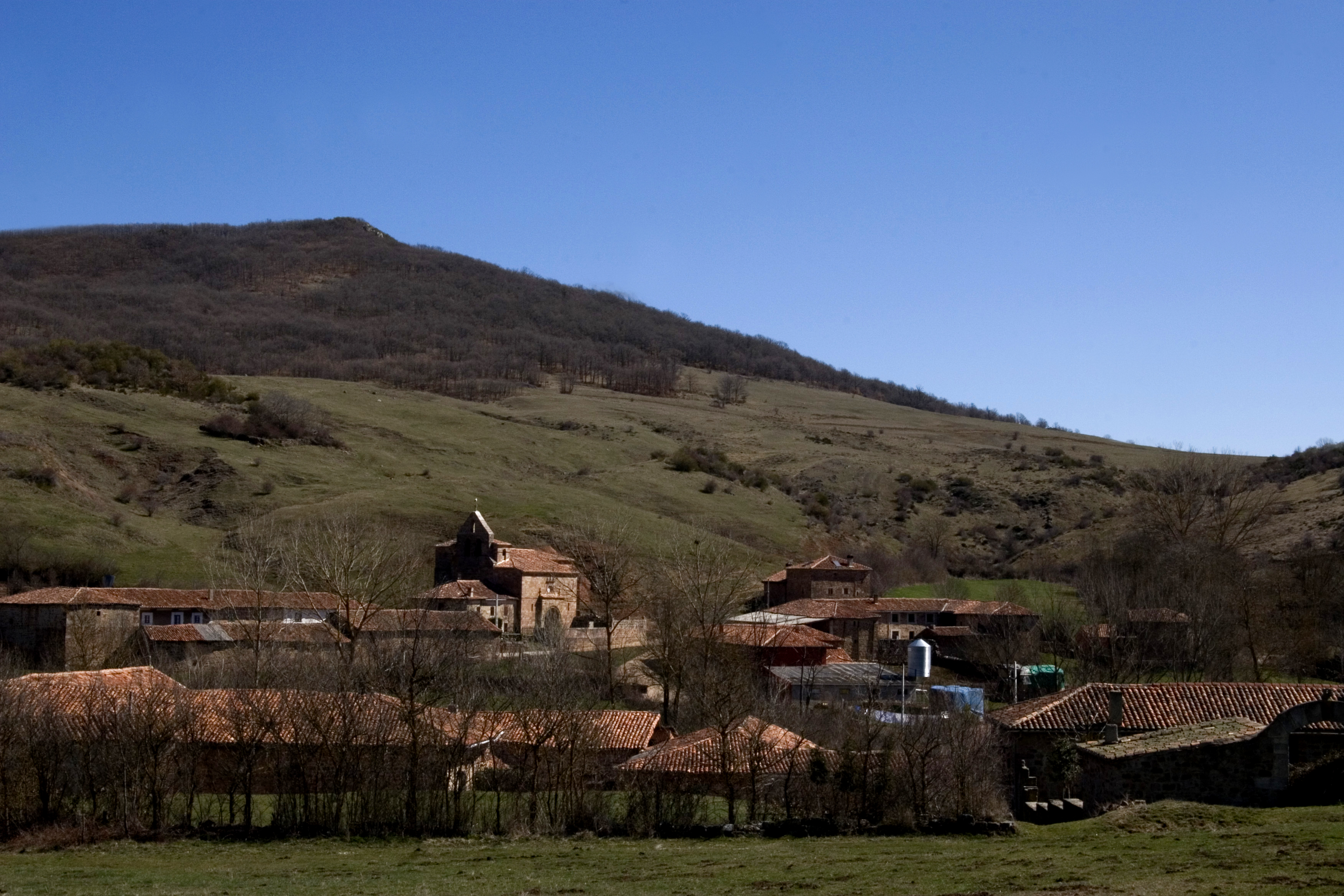
Panoramic view of Bustillo de Santullán town (Barruelo de Santullán).

== See also ==
- Rubagón
- Pilar Santiago
