= Cantabrian Mountains =

Mountain range in Spain

- Spanish: Cordillera Cantábrica
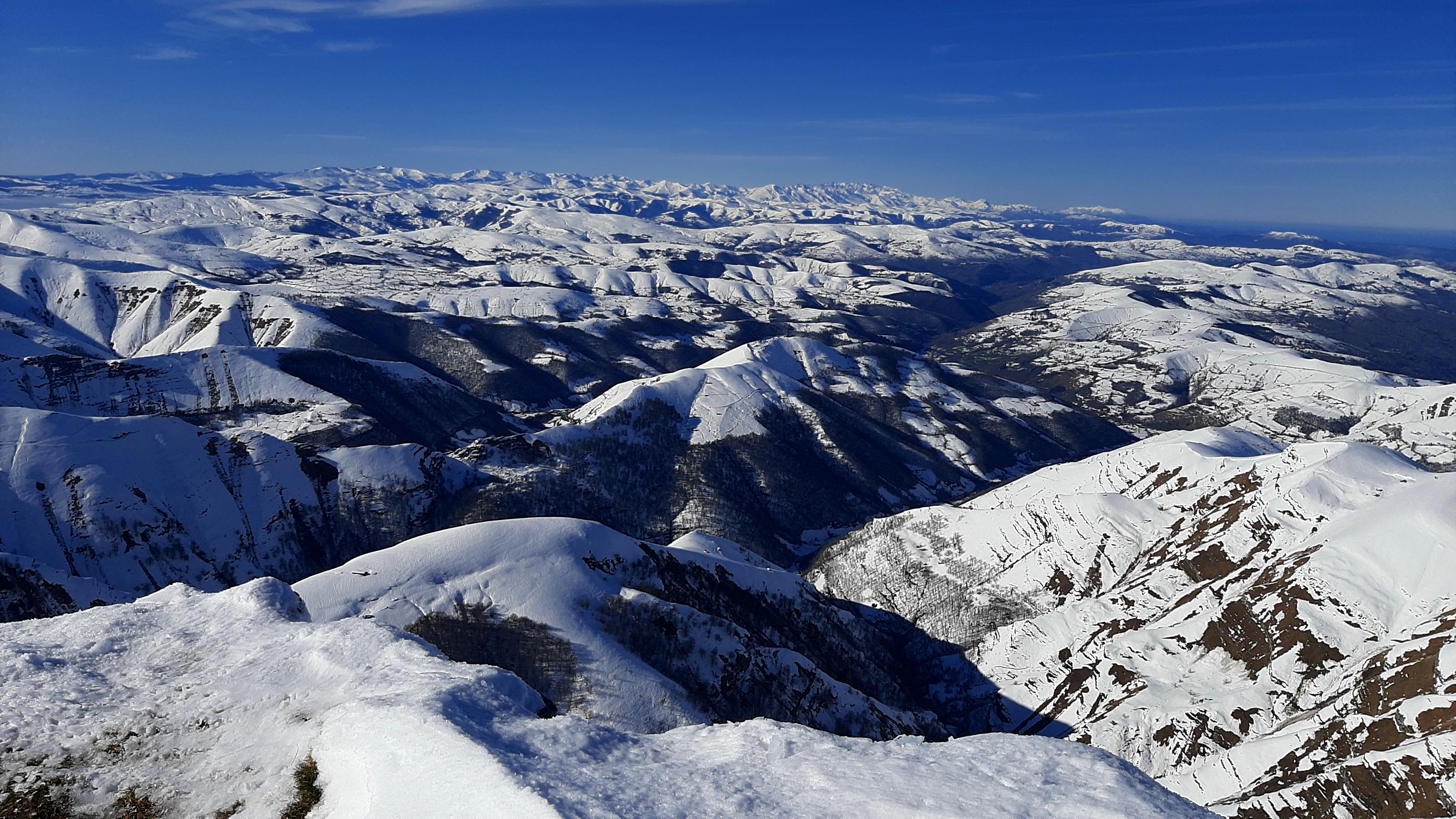
- Cantabrian Mountains parallel to the Cantabrian Sea seen from Castro Valnera in an east-west direction. In the background, the Montaña Palentina (left) and the Picos de Europa (right)

Highest point
- Peak: Torre de Cerredo
- Elevation: 2,648 m (8,688 ft)
- Coordinates: 43°11′51″N 04°51′06″W

Dimensions
- Length: 300 km (190 mi) WE
- Width: 50 km (31 mi) NS

Naming
- Etymology: Named after the Cantabri

Geography
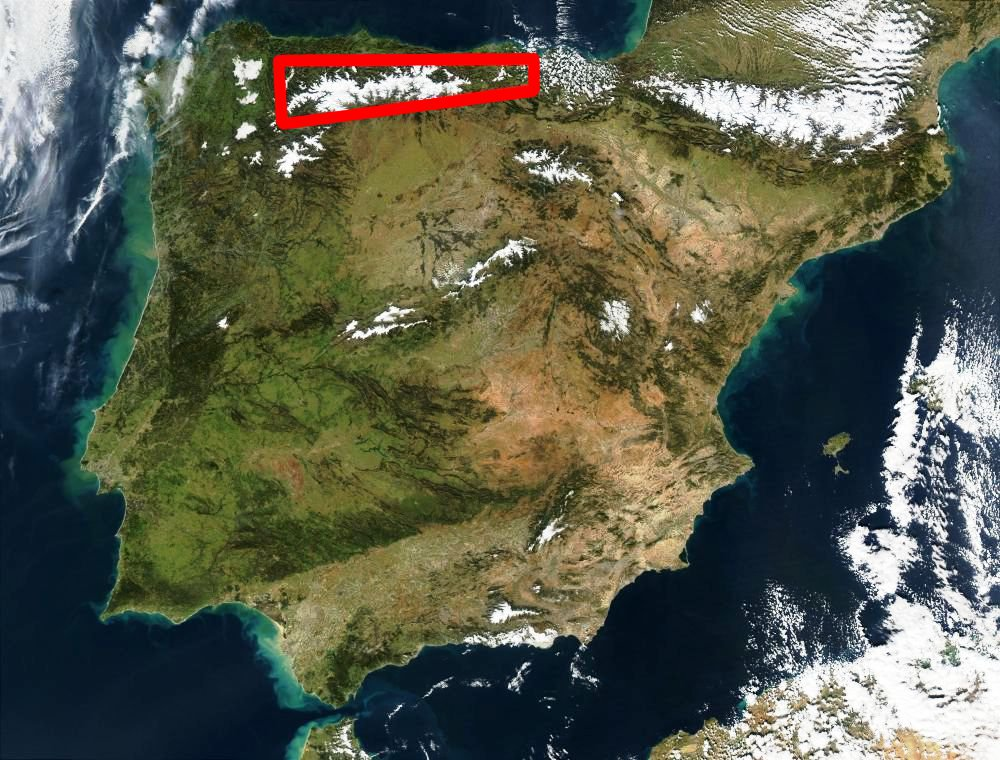
- Location of the Cantabrian Mountains in northern Spain
- Country: Spain
- Communities: Asturias; Basque Country; Cantabria; Castile and León
- Range coordinates: 43°N 5°W
- Borders on: Pyrenees; Galicia

Geology
- Rock age(s): Carboniferous, Paleozoic, Mesozoic
- Rock type: Limestone

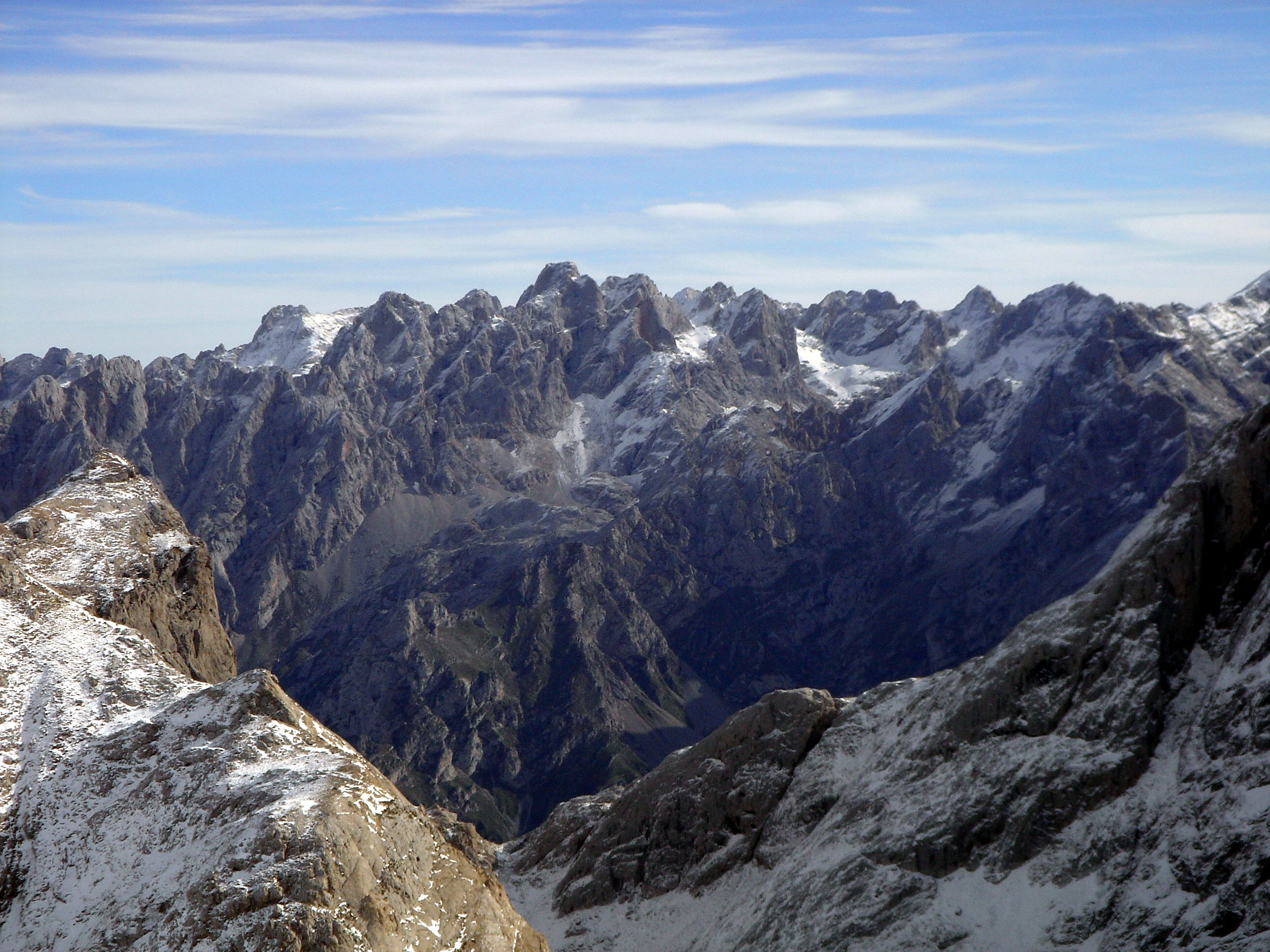
Torre de Cerredo (2,650 m.), the highest summit of the Cantabrian Mountains

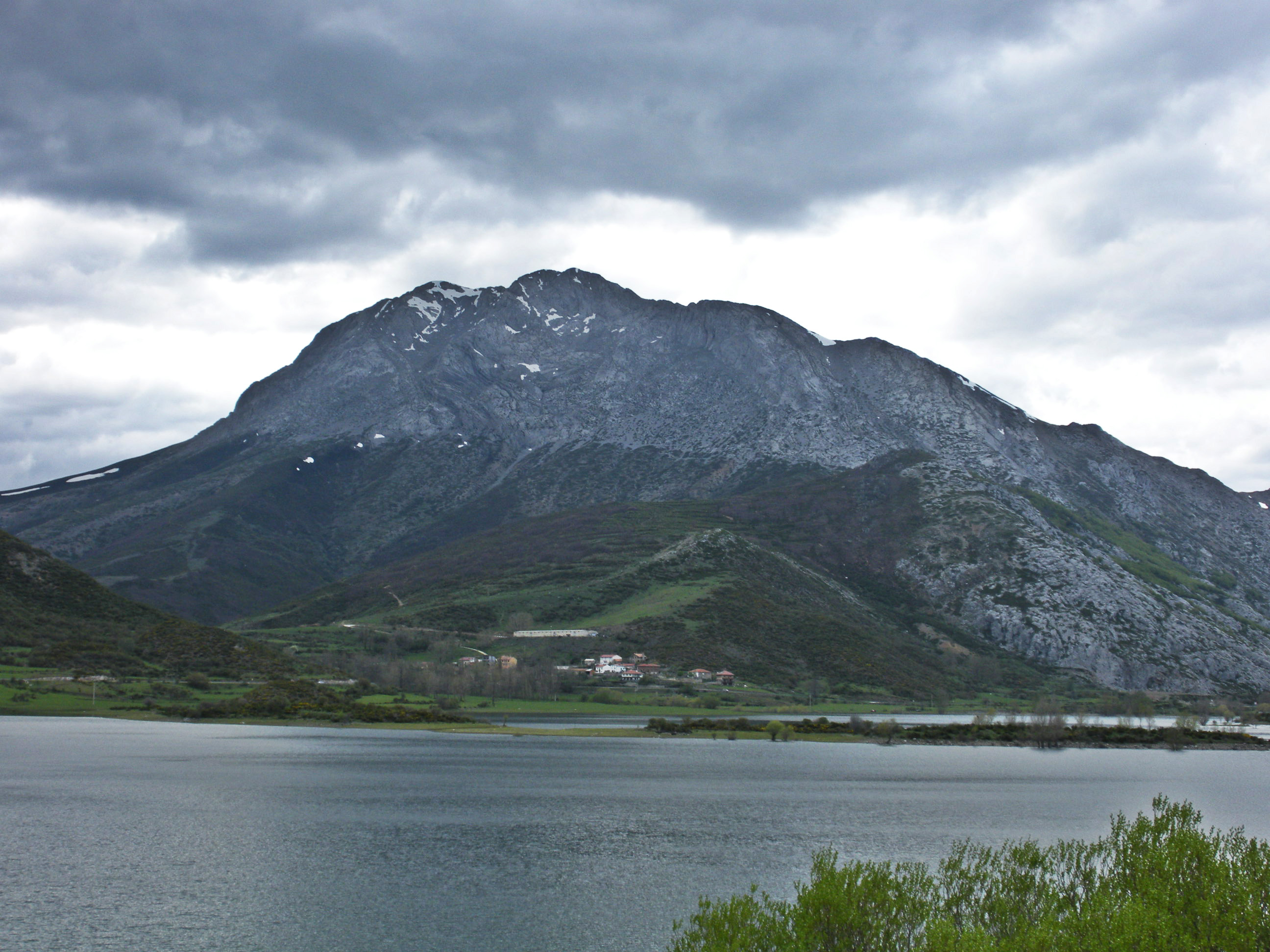
Pico Espigüete (2,450 m.)

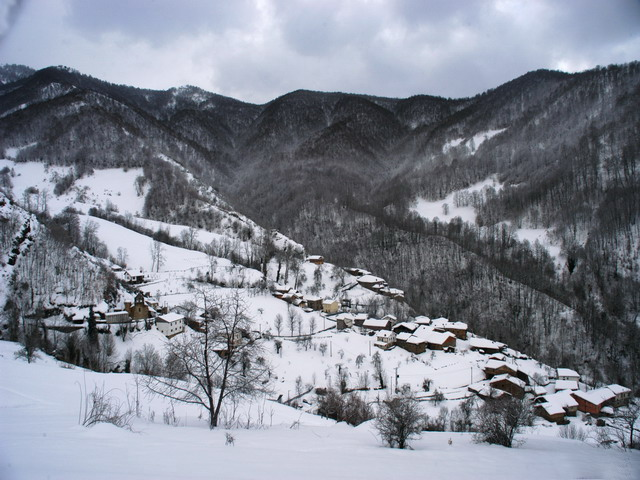
Typical Cantabrian Mountains landscape in winter

The Cantabrian Mountains or Cantabrian Range (Spanish: Cordillera Cantábrica) are one of the main systems of mountain ranges in Spain. They stretch for over 300 km (180 miles) across northern Spain, from the western limit of the Pyrenees to the Galician Massif in Galicia, along the coast of the Cantabrian Sea. Their easternmost end meets the Sistema Ibérico.

These mountains are a distinct physiographic province of the larger Alpine System physiographic division.

The Cantabrian Mountains offer a wide range of trails for hiking, as well as many challenging climbing routes. Skiing is possible in the ski resorts of Alto Campoo, Valgrande-Pajares, Fuentes de Invierno, San Isidro, Leitariegos and Manzaneda.

== Geography ==
The Cantabrian Mountains stretch east–west, nearly parallel to the Cantabrian Sea, as far as the Pass of Leitariegos, also extending south between León and Galicia. The range's western boundary is marked by the valley of the river Minho (Spanish: Miño), by the lower Sil, which flows into the Miño, and by the Cabrera River, a small tributary of the Sil. The Cantabrian Mountains reach their south-western limit in Portugal.

As a whole the Cantabrian Mountains are remarkable for their intricate ramifications, but almost everywhere, and especially in the east, it is possible to distinguish two principal ranges, from which the lesser ridges and mountain masses radiate. One range, or series of ranges, closely follows the outline of the coast; the other, which is loftier, forms the northern limit of the great tableland of Castile and León, and is sometimes regarded as a continuation of the Pyrenees. In some parts the coastal range rises sheer above the sea, and everywhere has so abrupt a declivity that the streams which flow seaward are all short and swift.

The descent from the southern range to the high plateaus of Castile is more gradual, and several large rivers, notably the Ebro, rise here and flow to the south or west. The breadth of the Cantabrian chain, with all its ramifications, increases from about 97 km (60 mi) in the east to about 185 kilometres (115 mi) in the west. Many peaks are over 1,800 metres (6,000 ft) high, but the greatest altitudes are attained in the central ridges on the borders of León, Asturias, Palencia and Cantabria. Here are the highest peak Torre de Cerredo (2,648 metres (8,688 ft)), Peña Vieja (2,615 metres (8,579 ft)), Peña Prieta (2,531 metres (8,304 ft)) and Espigüete (2,407 metres (7,898 ft)); an unnamed summit in the Picos de Europa, to which range the Peña Vieja also belongs, rises on the right bank of the Sella to a height of 2,452 metres (8,045 ft); further west the peaks of Manpodres, Peña Ubiña, Peña Rubia and Cuiña all exceed 2,100 metres (7,000 ft). A conspicuous feature of the chain, as of the adjacent tableland, is the number of its parameras, isolated plateaus shut in by lofty mountains or even by precipitous walls of rock.

The Cantabrian Mountains sharply divide "Green Spain", to the north, from the dry central plateau. The north facing slopes receive heavy cyclonic rainfall from the Cantabrian Sea, whereas the southern slopes are in rain shadow.

== Main ranges ==
The Cantabrian Range has three very distinct sections from west to east:

=== Western ===
The Asturian Massif and its foothills. Geologically it is an eastern prolongation of the Galician Massif with Paleozoic folds. It is cut by deep east-west oriented canyons such as the Cares River valley. Highest point Torre de Cerredo 2,648 m.

- Sierra de la Bobia, Pico de la Bobia 1,201 m
- Sierra de Tineo, Mulleiroso 1,241 m, a northern foothill located near Tineo
- Sierra de San Isidro, Campo de La Vaga 1,078 m
- Sierra de Eirelo, Pena dos Ladróis 800 m
- Sierra del Sueve, Picu Pienzu 1,161 m, a northern foothill west of the Sella River
- Sierra de Cuera, Pico Turbina 1,315 m, a northern foothill located at the eastern end of Asturias
- Sierra de Quintanal, running transversally on the eastern side of the Narcea River
- Other ranges of the Asturian Massif are: Sierra del Aramo, Sierra de Pando, Sierra de Caniellas, Sierra de Rañadoiro, Loma de Parrondo, Sierra de San Mamés, Sierra de Serrantina, Sierra de la Zarza, Sierra de Degaña, Sierra del Acebo, Sierra de Sobia, Cordal de Lena, Sierra de Casomera, Porrones de Moneo, and Cordal de Ponga

=== Central ===
The main mountains of this zone are the massive Picos de Europa. They are composed of Carboniferous limestone and marl. The Paramo de Masa and La Lora grasslands are located in the south crossed by the Rudrón Valley.

- Sierra de Covadonga, west of the Picos de Europa
- Sierra de Dobros, north of the Picos de Europa
- The Picos de Europa are divided into three sectors or massifs:
  - Cornión Massif in the west, Torre Santa 2,596 m
  - Urrieles Massif in the center, Torrecerredo 2,650 m
  - Ándara Massif in the east, Morra de Lechugales 2,444 m
  - Sierra de Liencres, a coastal range, another northern foothill
  - Sierra Nedrina
- Mountain ranges in Cantabria, located further east:
  - Fuentes Carrionas Massif, Peña Prieta 2,536 m, close to the eastern end of the Picos de Europa
  - Sierra Cocón above Tresviso
  - Sierra del Escudo de Cabuérniga, a northern foothill of the system, located between the main ridges and the sea
  - Sierra de la Gándara, Peña Cabarga 537 m, a lower northern foothill located further east
  - Montes de Ucieda
  - Alto del Gueto
  - Sierra de la Matanza
  - Sierra de Peña Sagra, Peña Sagra 2,046 m
  - Sierra de Peña Labra, Pico Tres Mares 2,175 m and Peña Labra 2,006 m
  - Sierra del Cordel in the Saja and Nansa Comarca
  - Sierra del Escudo, between Campoo de Yuso and Luena
  - Sierra de Híjar, foothills located in the high plateau at the southeastern end of the central zone
    - Valdecebollas
  - Sierra del Hornijo, Mortillano 1,410
  - Sierra de Breñas, foothill running perpendicular to the coast
  - Montes de Pas, Castro Valnera 1,707 m in the transition area to the Basque Mountains

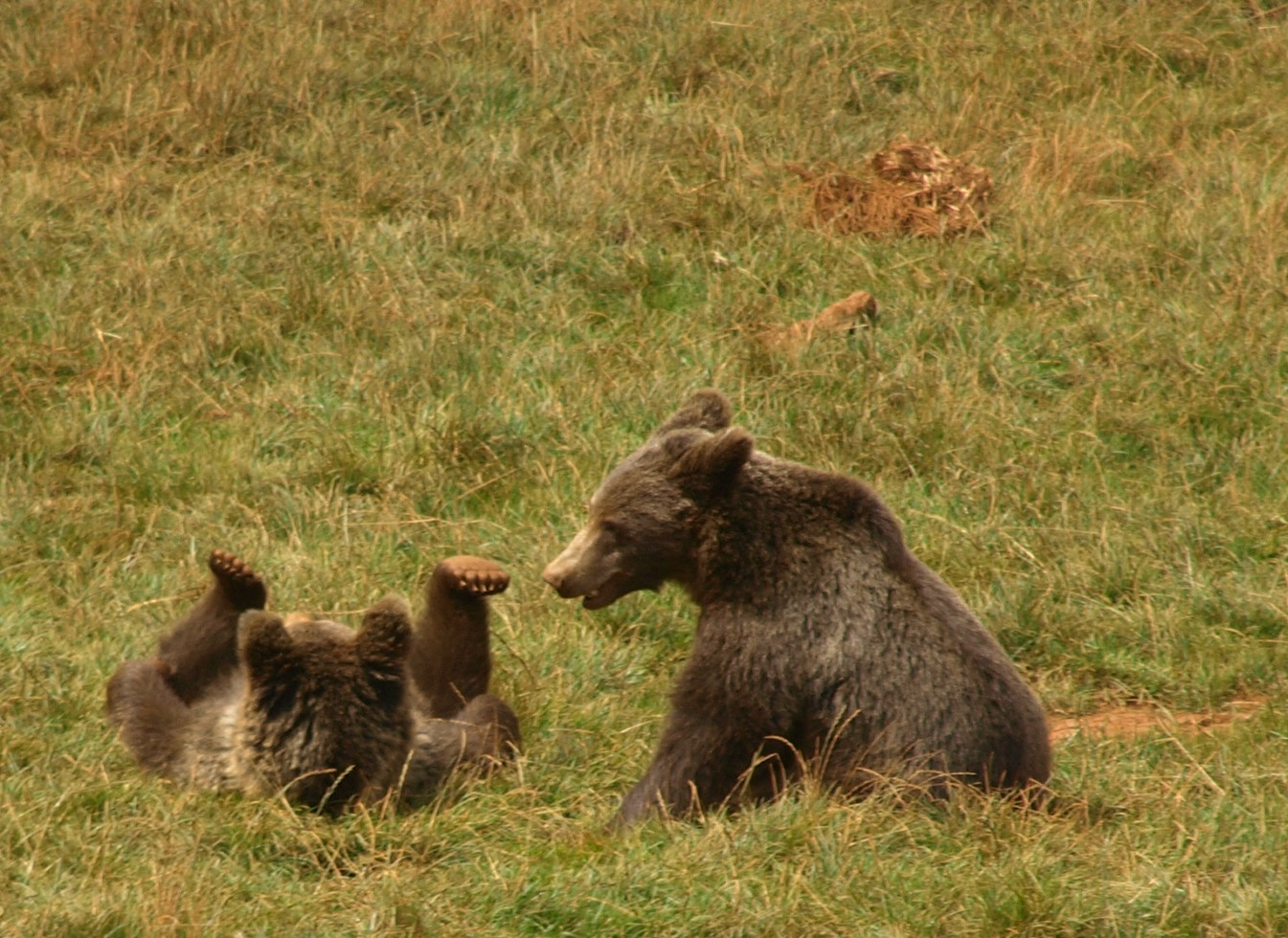
Cantabrian brown bear, found across northern Spain mountains

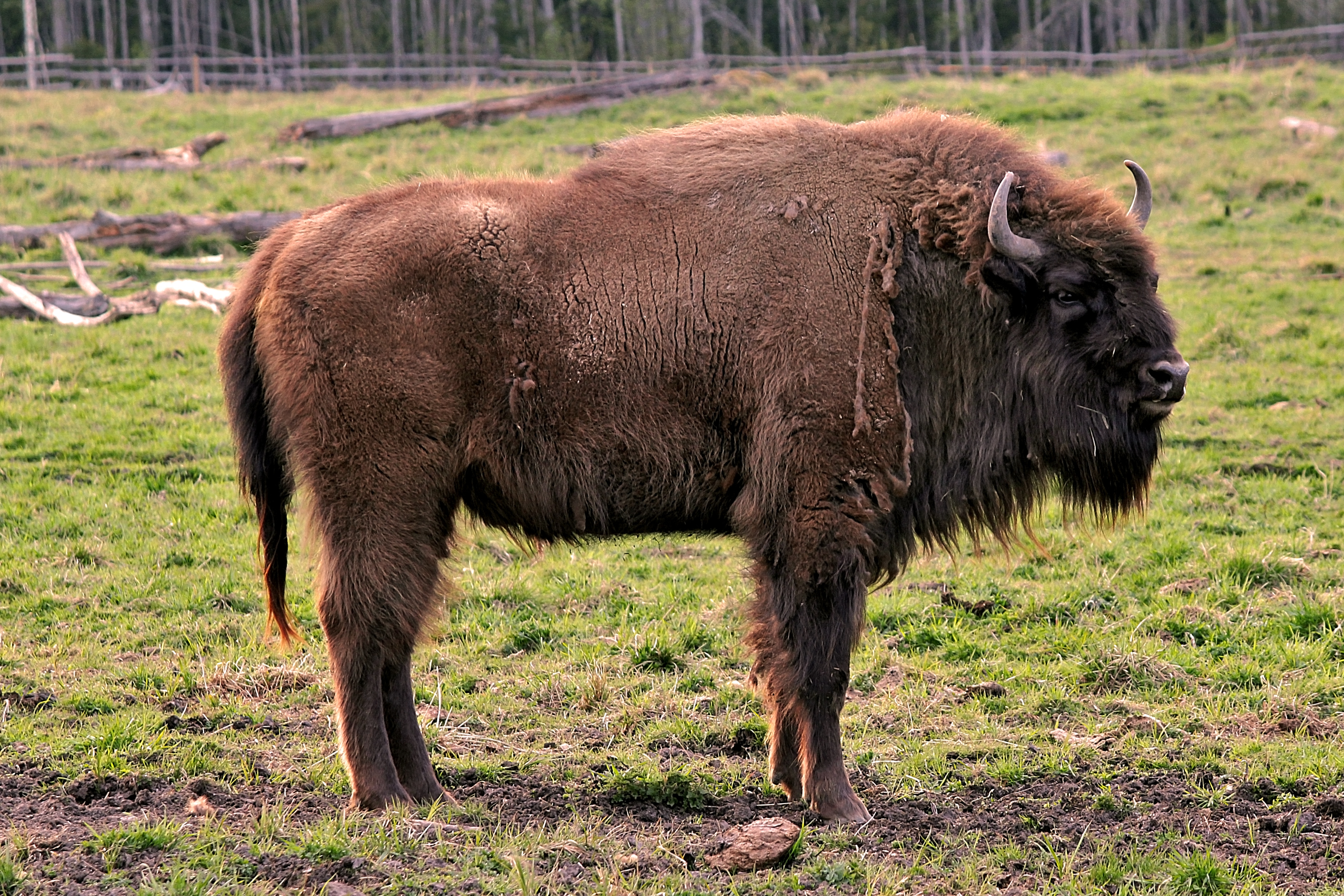
The Cantabrian Mountains has 2 reserves for the conservation of European bison. In Palencia and Asturias.

=== Eastern ===
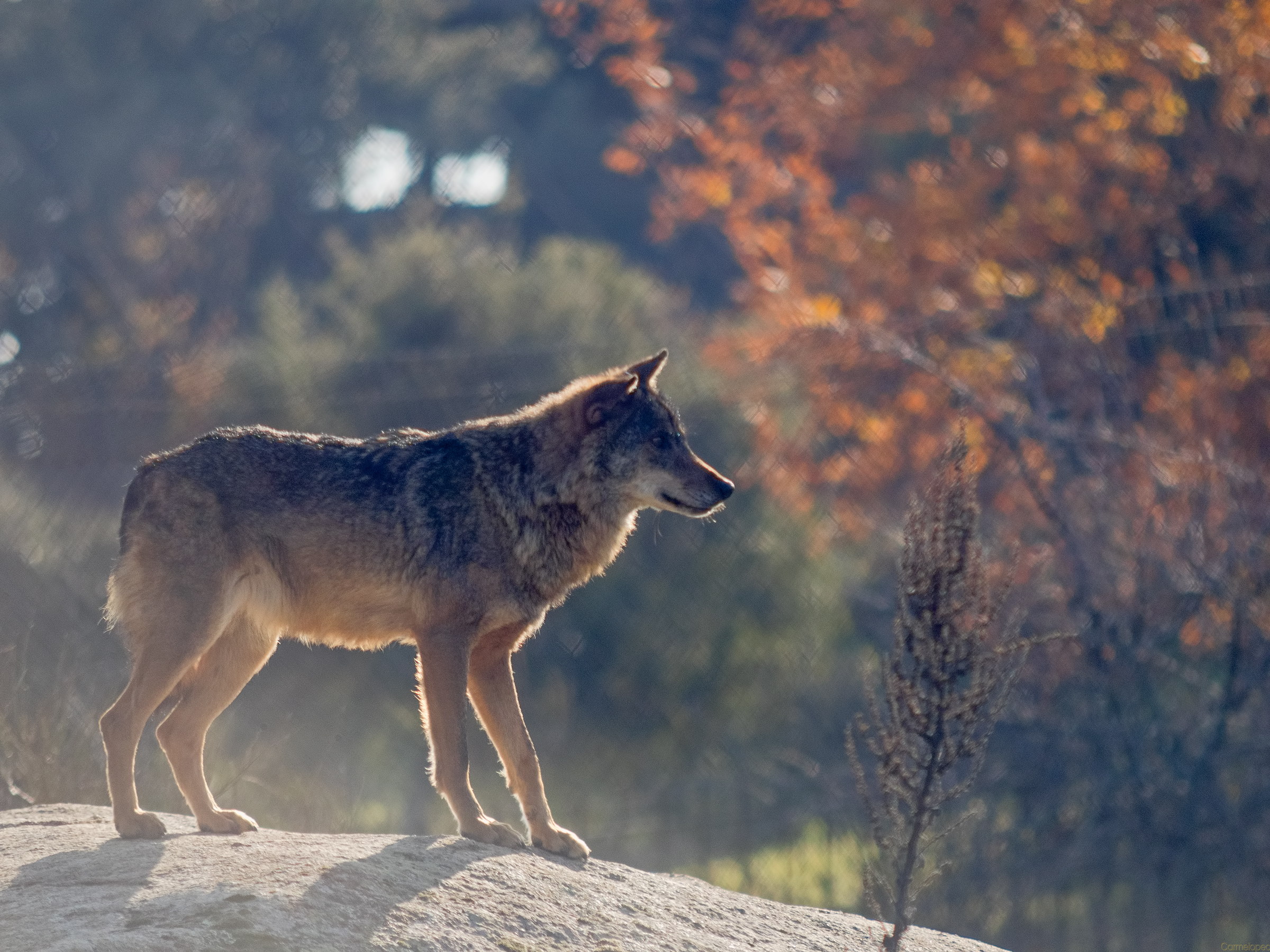
The Iberian wolf is a subspecies of grey wolf that inhabits the forest and plains of northwestern Iberia.

The Basque Mountains at the eastern end of the system, with very eroded Mesozoic folds and ranges of moderate height:

- Inner ranges:
  - Sierra Salbada (Orduña)
  - Mounts of Gasteiz, Kapildui 1,177 m
  - Izki
  - Urbasa, Baiza 1,183 m
  - Andía, with the impressive Beriain 1,493 m
- Coastal ranges:
  - Gorbea (Gorbeia) 1,481 m
  - Urkiola, Anboto 1,331 m
  - Elgea
  - Aizkorri, Aitxuri 1,551 m, highest peak in the Basque Mountains
  - Altzania, Aratz 1,442 m
  - Aralar, Txindoki 1,346 m
  - Other important mountains close to the sea include Ganekogorta, Oiz, Sollube, Arrate, Kalamua and Hernio

== Flora and fauna ==
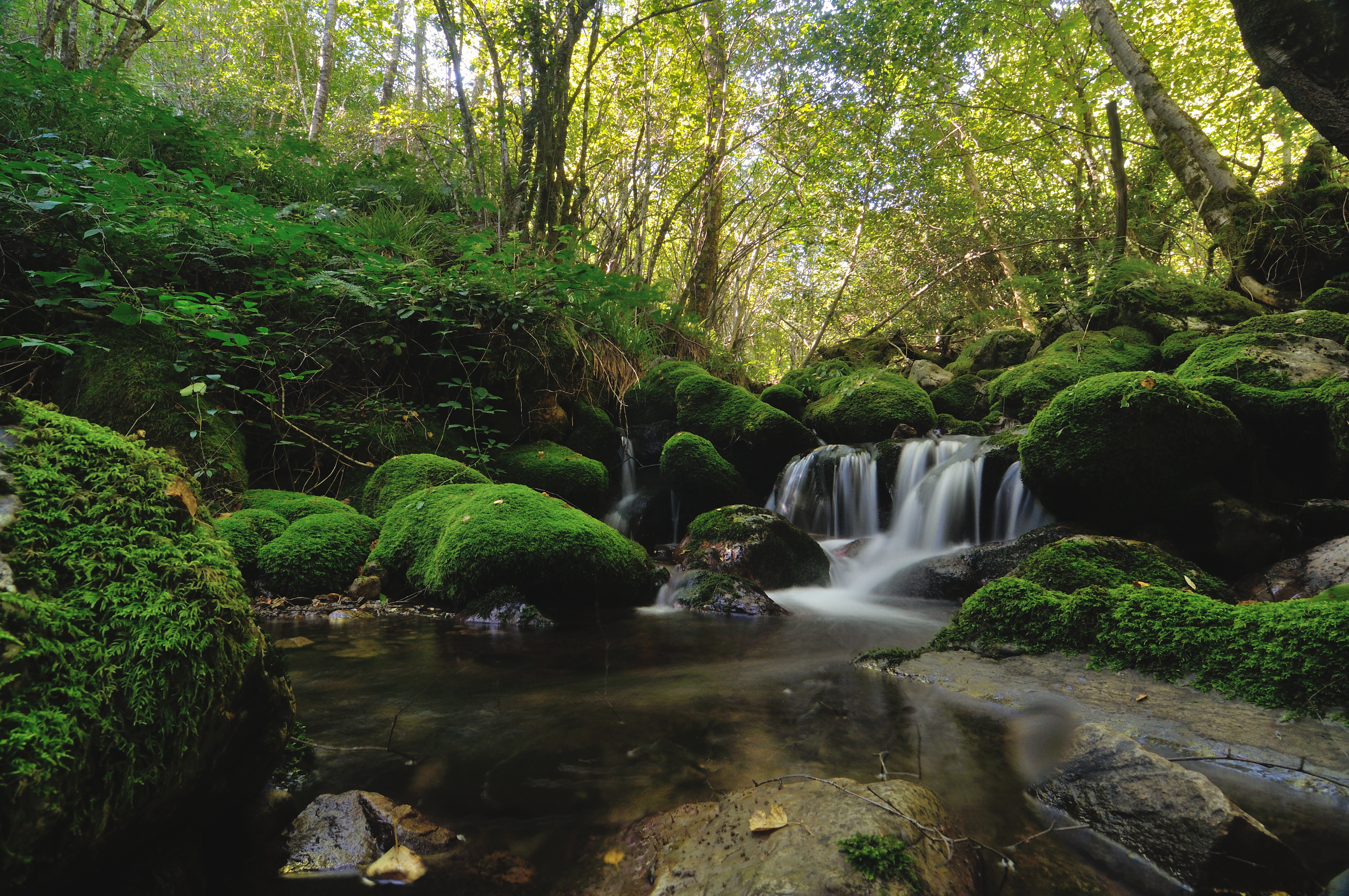
Typical wooded area in the Cantabrian Mountains

The Cantabrian montane woodlands are dominated by deciduous trees and evergreen conifers, primarily of the Fagales (beeches, hazels, oaks, walnuts) order, including European beech (Fagus sylvatica), English, holm and Pyrenean oak (Quercus robur, Q. ilex, Q. pyrenaica), as well as numerous junipers, pines and yews, among other species.

Mammalian species endemic to the area include the Cantabrian brown bear (Ursus arctos pyrenaicus), also known as the Pyrenean brown bear (in the Pyrenees portion of its range), a subspecies of Eurasian brown bear. Listed as being in danger of extinction, around 350–400 bears are thought to remain in Spain, a figure which, in and of itself, is a drastic improvement from the 100 or so bears that were left at the end of the 20th century. A combination of overhunting, human encroachment and loss of suitable wild habitats have led to the brown bear's gradual decline on the Iberian Peninsula. The Cantabrian brown bear subspecies ranges west from Asturias—the area of the bears' highest population density—to parts of Léon, Palencia and Cantabria.

Of a similar plight as the brown bear are the Iberian lynx (Lynx pardinus) and the Iberian wolf (Canis lupus signatus), both rarer carnivores which have been negatively affected by human activities in their home range; the Iberian lynx, however, has seen sharp declines due to its primary prey, the European rabbit, experiencing a species-wide pandemic and dying en masse. Conservation efforts have been undertaken, for both the lynx and the wolf. Other carnivores in the mountains include the European badger (M. meles), hedgehog (Erinaceus europaeus), least weasel (Mustela nivalis), pine and beech marten (M. martes and M. foida), polecat (Mustela putorius), red fox (V. vulpes), river otter (L. lutra), stoat (Mustela erminea) and the Eurasian wildcat (Felis silvestris). There are also known populations of non-native American mink (Neogale vison) and genet (G. genetta), the former being more typically associated with the African continent.

Stalked by the aforementioned carnivores are several ungulate and herbivore species, which include the endemic rebeco or Cantabrian chamois (Rupicapra pyrenaica parva), a type of goat-antelope, and Pyrenean ibex (Capra pyrenaica pyrenaica). Protected areas feature some reintroduced herds of European bison (Bison bonasus), or wizent, another conservation-focused species. Other hoofed mammals in the mountains include European fallow (D. dama) and red deer (Cervus elaphus), western roe deer (C. capreolus) and wild boar (Sus scrofa).

Among the many birds, a capercaillie subspecies, the Cantabrian capercaillie (Tetrao urogallus cantabricus), is among the largest in the region, with the male birds regularly displaying for females by making their signature "throat-calls", and dueling one another over territory.

== Protected areas ==
The Cantabrian mountain range includes several protected areas such as the Picos de Europa National Park, which is one of several Cantabrian parks included in UNESCO's World Network of Biosphere Reserves. Some of the sites are included in the European Union's Natura 2000 network and Special Protection Areas for the Conservation of Wild Birds.

- Picos de Europa National Park
- Muniellos Nature Reserve
- Fuentes del Narcea, Degaña e Ibias Natural Park
- Redes Natural Park
- Somiedo Natural Park
- Protected Landscape Area of Sierra del Sueve
- Fuentes Carrionas and Fuente Cobre-Montaña Palentina Natural Park
- Saja-Besaya Natural Park
- Collados del Asón Natural Park
- Ojo Guareña
