= Brañosera =

Coordinates: 42°56′N 4°18′W

- municipality
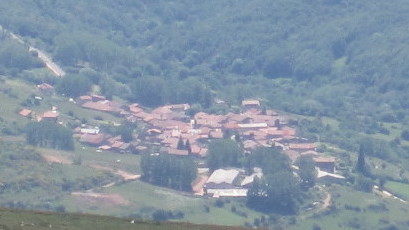

- Coat of arms
- Interactive map of Brañosera
- Country: Spain
- Autonomous community: Castile and León
- Province: Palencia
- Municipality: Brañosera

Area
  - Total: 61.97 km^{2} (23.93 sq mi)
- Elevation: 1,220 m (4,000 ft)

Population (2025-01-01)
  - Total: 253
  - Density: 4.08/km^{2} (10.6/sq mi)
- Time zone: UTC+1 (CET)
  - Summer (DST): UTC+2 (CEST)
- Website: Official website

Brañosera is a municipality located in the province of Palencia, Castile and León, Spain. According to the 2004 census (INE), the municipality had a population of 284 inhabitants. Brañosera has the oldest town hall in the entirety of Spain.

== See also ==
- Rubagón
