= Pisuerga =

River in Spain

Coordinates: 41°39′13″N 4°44′04″W

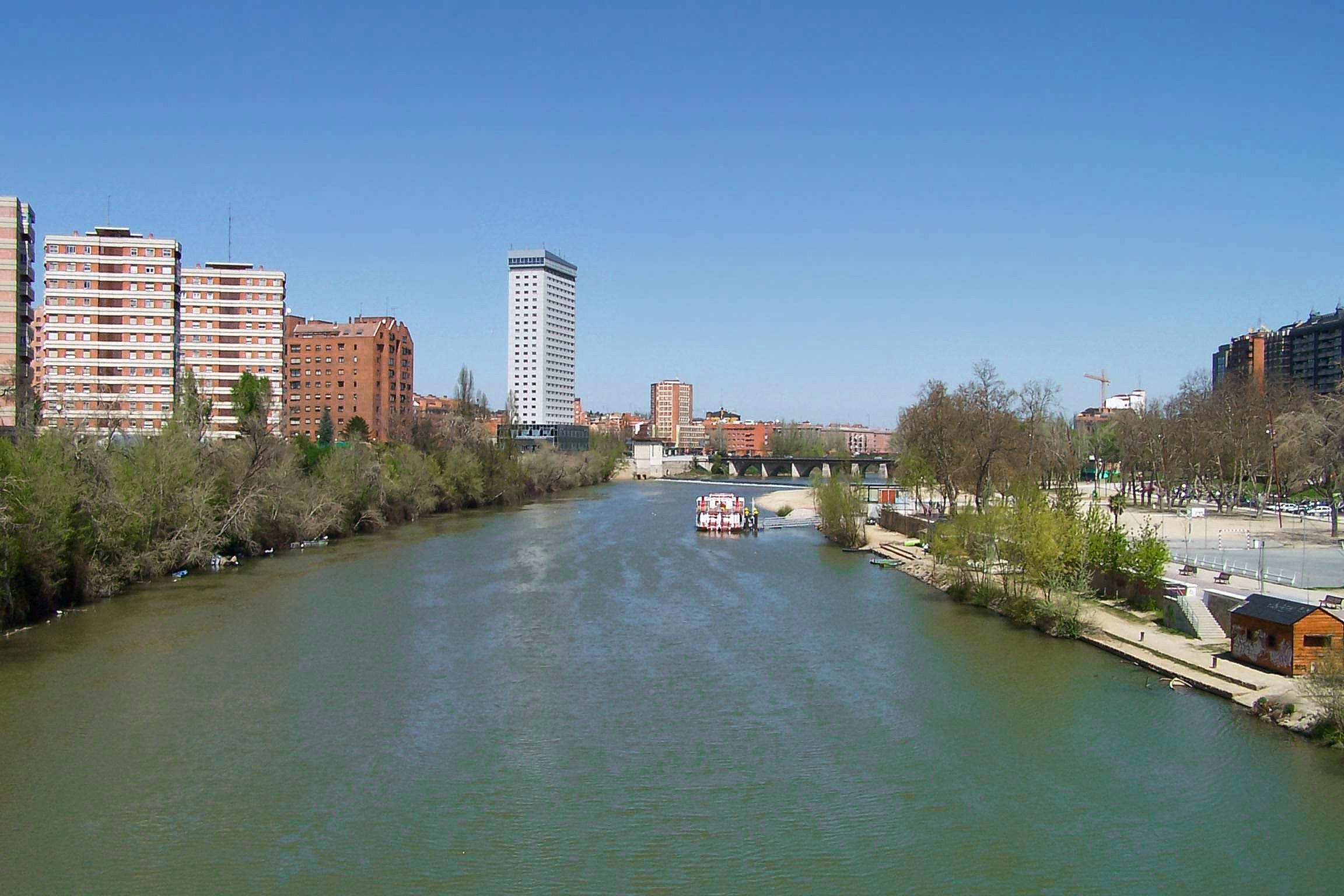
- The Pisuerga passing through Valladolid.

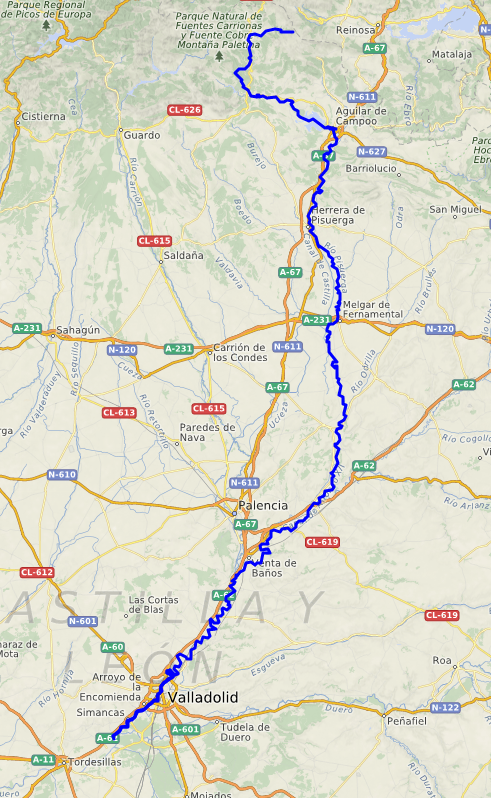

Location
- Country: Spain
- Region: Burgos; Palencia; Valladolid

Physical characteristics
- Source
  - location: Cantabrian Mountains
  - elevation: 1,800 m (5,900 ft)
- Mouth
  - elevation: 678 m (2,224 ft)
- Length: 283 km (176 mi)
- Discharge
  - average: 2,586 million cubic metres per year (81.9 m^{3}/s; 2,894 cu ft/s)

Basin features
- Progression: Douro→ Atlantic Ocean

The Pisuerga is a river in northern Spain, the Duero's second largest tributary. It rises in the Cantabrian Mountains in the province of Palencia, autonomous region of Castile and León. Its traditional source is called Fuente Cobre, but it has been discovered that the real source is a glacier higher in the mountains. The river flows south into the Douro river shortly after passing through the city of Valladolid. Its length is approximately 270 kilometres (170 mi).

Since the 1950s the water level of the river has been very regular throughout the year due to the huge Aguilar de Campoo dam which collects all the water from the river's rainy upper valleys. This regulation has allowed the creation of vast extensions of irrigated farmland along the Pisuerga's course across the northern Castilian plain.

== In Spanish culture ==
The Spanish phrase aprovechando que el Pisuerga pasa por Valladolid ("And now since Pisuerga crosses Valladolid") is a popular way to point out or acknowledge a non sequitur since the river has no bearing with the following "consequence".

== See also ==
- List of rivers of Spain
