= August 1937 =

Month of 1937

<<	August 1937					>>
Su	Mo	Tu	We	Th	Fr	Sa
1	2	3	4	5	6	7
8	9	10	11	12	13	14
15	16	17	18	19	20	21
22	23	24	25	26	27	28
29	30	31

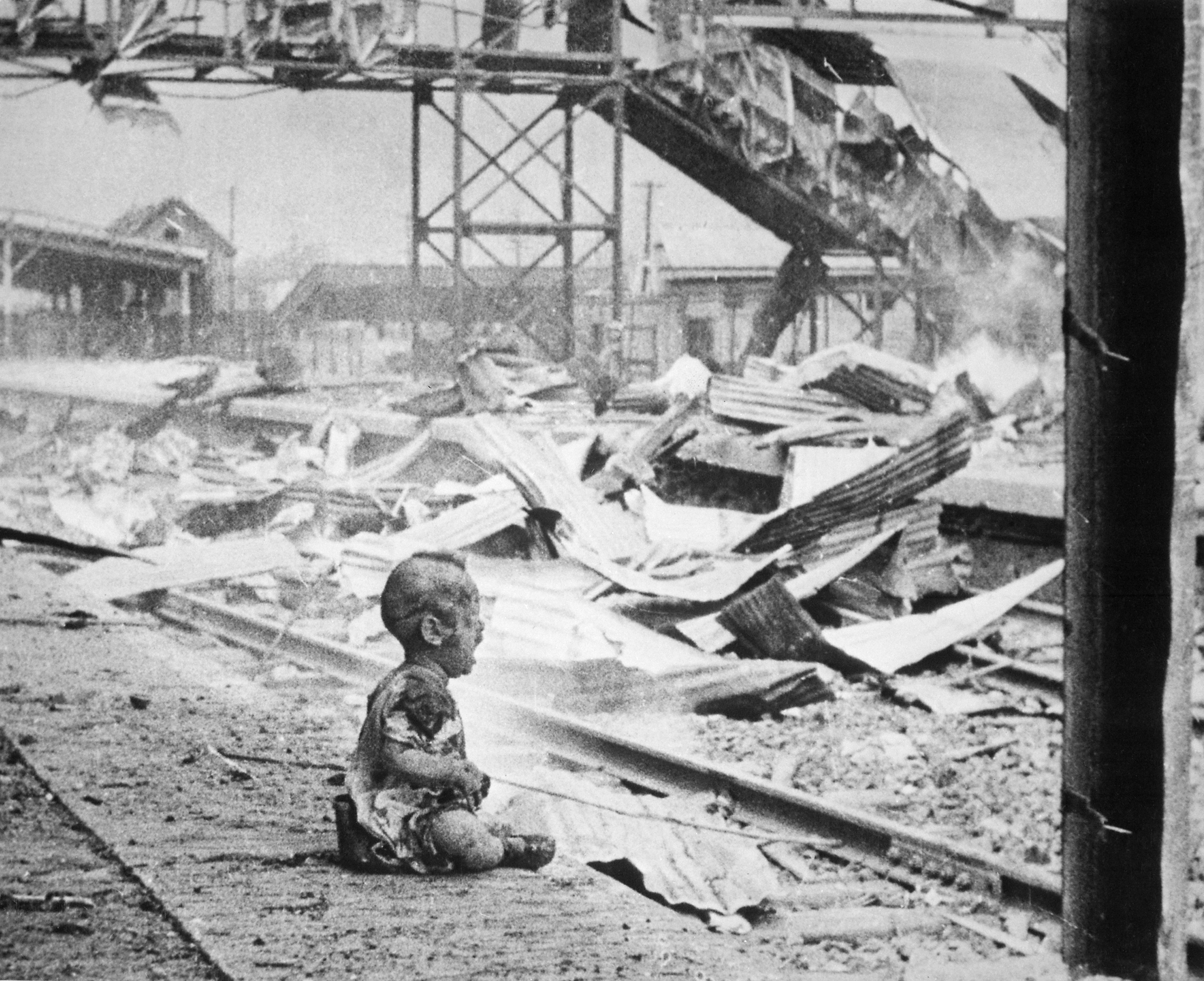
August 28, 1937: Japanese planes bomb Shanghai and Wong Ha-sheng takes the Bloody Saturday photograph.

The following events occurred in August 1937:

== August 1, 1937 (Sunday) ==
- The Meuse-Argonne American Memorial was dedicated in Montfaucon-d'Argonne in France.
- The Moscow Military Music College was founded in the Soviet Union by Major General Semyon Chernetsky, conductor and music director of the Central Military Band of the Soviet defense ministry.
- SS-Obersturmbannführer Karl-Otto Koch arrived with his wife Ilse Koch at Nazi Germany's Buchenwald concentration camp to carry out the internment and execution of thousands of Jews and other political prisoners.
- American serial killer Anna Marie Hahn committed her fifth and final murder, after having poisoned five elderly men whom she had befriended and taken care of. Following the death of retired cobbler Georg Obendoerfer, Hahn was arrested. She would be executed in the electric chair at the Ohio Penitentiary on December 7, 1938.
- The popular radio program Good Will Hour, sponsored by Macfadden Communications Group and hosted by John J. Anthony, premiered nationwide in the U.S. on stations of the Mutual Broadcasting System, and would run for more than 15 years until the end of 1952.
- Born:
  - Oleg Vinogradov, Soviet Russian choreographer and ballet director for the Kirov Ballet; in Leningrad
  - Al D'Amato, U.S. Senator for New York from 1981 to 1999; in Brooklyn

== August 2, 1937 (Monday) ==
- The Marihuana Tax Act was signed into law by U.S. President Franklin Roosevelt and took effect on October 1. Though not specifically outlawing or permitting the cultivation or sale of marijuana, the federal law required any person who did so to register with the U.S. government prior to paying a tax, providing the basis for identification (to allow states to enforce their own laws) and federal prosecution by the U.S. government for previous failure to pay the tax. The law would be struck down by the U.S. Supreme Court in the 1969 decision in Leary v. United States and replaced soon afterward in 1971 by the Controlled Substances Act.
- All six passengers and three crew of an Ala Littoria airliner were killed after the Savoia-Marchetti S.73 took off from Wadi Halfa on a flight to Asmara as part of its multi-stop flight from Rome to Addis Ababa.
- Born:
  - Ghulam Mustafa Khar, Pakistani politician who served as Governor of Punjab province 1971-1973 and as its Chief Minister 1973-1974; in Sanawan, Punjab Province, British India
  - Garth Hudson, Canadian rock keyboardist for The Band; in Windsor, Ontario (d. 2025)
  - Billy Cannon, American college and pro football halfback, inductee to the College Football Hall of Fame; in Philadelphia, Mississippi (d. 2018)

== August 3, 1937 (Tuesday) ==
- All 14 people aboard a Pan American-Grace Airways seaplane were killed when the Sikorsky S-43 plunged into the ocean 20 miles (32 km) off of the coast of Panama.
- The explosion of a gasoline depot in Turkey, between Bairakli and Burnova, killed 24 oil workers.
- The 20th biennial World Zionist Congress opened in Zürich, Switzerland.
- Generalissimo Francisco Franco informed Italy that he had intelligence that the Soviets were shipping arms to the Republic. Franco urged Italian action to stop the transports.
- Born: Steven Berkoff (stage name for Leslie Steven Berks), English stage and film actor known for his roles as a villain in Beverly Hills Cop, Octopussy, Rambo: First Blood Part II and War and Remembrance; in Stepney, London

== August 4, 1937 (Wednesday) ==
- In British India, a team of climbers led by Frank Smythe became the first people to reach the top of the 22,490 feet (6,850 m) high Himalayan mountain Deoban.
- The Bolivarian National Guard of Venezuela, named for South American hero Simon Bolivar was founded as a national police force by Venezuela's President Eleazar López Contreras.
- In Little Rock, Arkansas, the newly formed Society for the Booing of Commercial Advertisements in Motion Picture Theatres made its debut, booing loudly when corporate advertising appeared on the movie screen. Similar "booing clubs" soon began springing up elsewhere. In the 1930s and '40s movie houses experimented with running ads for commercial products alongside movie trailers, but many theatregoers resented the practice because, unlike the radio where ads were recognized as necessary, movies were not free.
- Born:
  - Paul Abels, American Methodist minister and the first the openly gay cleric of a church in a major Christian denomination (as pastor of New York's Washington Square Methodist Episcopal Church from 1973 to 1984; in Yellow Springs, Ohio (d. 1992 from complications of AIDS)
  - Angie Ferro, Filipino film, TV and stage actress; in Baleno, Masbate (d. 2023)
  - David Bedford, English composer and musician; in Hendon, London (d. 2011)
- Died:
  - K.P. Jayaswal, 55, Indian historian and lawyer
  - Hans Reck, 51, German volcanologist and paleontologist, died of a heart attack while on an expedition to Portuguese East Africa (now Mozambique).

== August 5, 1937 (Thursday) ==
- Japanese Emperor Hirohito ratified a directive removing the constraints of international law on the treatment of Chinese prisoners of war, a decision that would be followed by the execution or death by illness of all but 56 Chinese POWs taken during the war by Japan against China, as well as brutal treatment of Allied prisoners during World War II.
- The Soviet Union's secret police, the NKVD, began carrying out the repression of Ingrian Finns and other speakers of the Finnish language within its borders as part of its campaign against ethnic Finnish residents. During the first month of the operation ordered by NKVD Order No. 00447, 728 people were arrested, and in 1938, there would be 5,340 placed in prison. Before the NKVD operation was terminated on August 10, 1938, at least 8,000 Finns, and perhaps as many as 25,000 would die or simply disappear.
- Born: Herb Brooks, American Olympic ice hockey player and coach; in Saint Paul, Minnesota (d. 2003, automobile accident)
- Died: José Canals, 22, Spanish Olympic cross-country skier, was killed in action in the Spanish Civil War.

== August 6, 1937 (Friday) ==
- The National Cancer Institute was established in the United States as a division of the United States Public Health Service agency by legislation signed into law by President Franklin Roosevelt.
- The first recorded smoking-related airline accident occurred when all six people aboard an Aeroflot flight from Moscow to Prague crashed near Herina. The accident was traced to one of the three passengers lighting a cigarette in the toilet, igniting accumulated fumes from aviation fuel.
- The Soviet Union and the United States agreed to extend their trade pact for one additional year. The Soviets agreed to spend $40,000,000 in purchases from the U.S., which in turn continued its most favored nation status for the Soviet Union.
- Born: Barbara Windsor, English actress; in Shoreditch, London (d. 2020)

== August 7, 1937 (Saturday) ==
- The Japanese began to evacuate their concession at Hankou, citing "the steadily growing tension and a desire to prevent an incident likely to aggravate the general situation."
- World War I veteran Harold Wobber, 47, became the first person definitively known to have committed suicide by jumping from the Golden Gate Bridge.
- Marcian Germanovich, Soviet corps commander, was arrested two months after being dismissed from the Red Army, apparently because of his association with General Mikhail Tukhachevsky, who had been executed on June 12. Germanovich would be shot in prison on September 20
- Born:
- Rosemary Smith, Irish rally car driver; in Dublin (d. 2023)"Rosemary Smith: Pioneer of world motorsport". The Irish Times.
- Magic Slim (stage name for Morris Holt), blues singer and guitarist and inductee to the Blues Hall of Fame; in Torrance, Mississippi (d. 2013)
- Died:
  - Eddie Gerard, 47, Canadian ice hockey player and manager, died of throat cancer. He would be one of the original inductees to the Hockey Hall of Fame on its founding in 1945.
  - Henri Lebasque, 71, French post-Impressionist painter
  - Howard E. Dorsey, 33, American hydraulic engineer who had been sworn into office five weeks earlier, was killed when he lost control of his automobile and ran over a 1,600 feet (490 m) cliff along with his passenger, secretary Marion Lonabaugh.
  - Takeo Wakabayashi, 29, Japanese footballer who played for the Japan national team, died from lung disease.

== August 8, 1937 (Sunday) ==
- A contingent of 3,000 Japanese soldiers conspicuously entered Beijing (at the time referred to in the Western press as "Peiping"), capital of the Republic of China without resistance. Japanese warplanes dropped propaganda leaflets on the populace proclaiming that the "Japanese army has driven out your wicked rulers and their wicked armies and will keep them out."
- The Butovo firing range began operations as an execution site for political prisoners who had been arrested by the NKVD, the Soviet secret police, as the first 91 prisoners were transported there from Moscow and shot. According to records kept by the NKVD, there were 20,761 executions until the Butovo range closed on October 19, 1938.
- Born:
  - Dustin Hoffman, American actor and director; in Los Angeles
  - Jorge Cafrune, popular Argentine folk singer; in El Carmen, Jujuy Province (killed in pedestrian accident, 1978)
- Died:
  - Jimmie Guthrie, 40, Scottish motorcycle racer, was killed competing in the German motorcycle Grand Prix.
  - Edmund Pearson, 57, author of "true crime" nonfiction books, died from bronchial pneumonia.

== August 9, 1937 (Monday) ==
- The government of Germany ordered a correspondent for The Times, Norman Ebbutt, to leave Germany. The move was made in retaliation for Britain expelling three German journalists on suspicion of espionage.
- Swiss-born American astronomer Fritz Zwicky became the first person on earth to observe a new supernova (SN 1937D) that had occurred in the galaxy designated NGC 1003 (visible within the western edge of the constellation Perseus) as much as 31 million years earlier
- The American alligator "Muja, estimated to be 12 years old, arrived at the Belgrade Zoo in Yugoslavia (now in Serbia) and would still be alive in 2025 as the oldest living known alligator in captivity.
- The adventure film Souls at Sea starring Gary Cooper, George Raft and Frances Dee premiered at the Globe Theatre in New York City.
- Born:
  - Nelson Villagra, Chilean film actor; in Chillán, Diguillín province
  - Forouzan (stage name for Parvin Kheyrbakhsh), Iranian film actress who was a star from 1963 until being banned from acting during the 1979 Iranian Revolution; in Bandar-e Anzali (d.2016)

== August 10, 1937 (Tuesday) ==
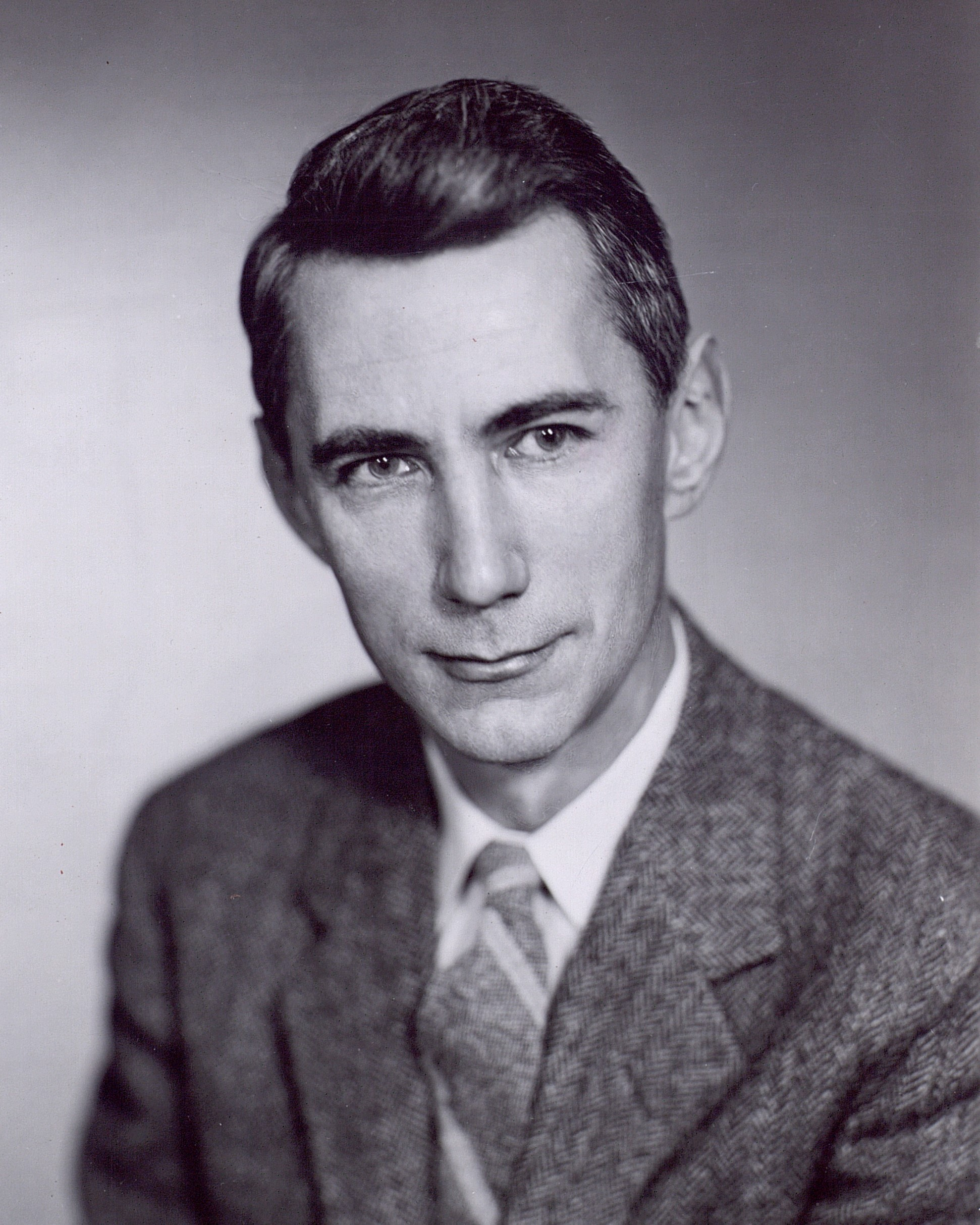
Claude Shannon, author of groundbreaking theory

- American mathematician Claude Shannon, described later as "the father of information theory" submitted his masters' thesis A Symbolic Analysis of Relay and Switching Circuits to the Massachusetts Institute of Technology. The paper, later described by Howard Gardner as "possibly the most important, and also the most famous, master's thesis of the century", demonstrated the electrical applications of Boolean algebra to establish the theoretical basis for digital circuits and digital computing.
- U.S. Patent No. 2,089,171 was awarded to musician George Beauchamp and Adolph Rickenbacker for the first electric guitar, three years after he had applied for the patent on June 2, 1934.
- The Republican tanker Campeador was sunk off Tunis by Italian destroyers. While 28 members of the crew were saved, 12 died.
- The Soviet secret police, the NKVD, arrested multiple people, identified as "counter-revolutionary" instigators, on the same day, including writer Aleksandr Voronsky, educator Boris Didkovsky and lawyer Evgen Gvaladze (all executed in 1937); Red Army corps commander Yepifan Kovtyukh (executed 1938); former NKVD official Boris Berman (shot 1939); and Mongolian folklorist Tsyben Zhamtsarano (who died in a labor camp, 1942).
- Émile Roblot took office as the Minister of State of the principality of Monaco, a post he would hold until 1944. Roblot was appointed by Prince Louis II to fill the vacancy caused by the death of
- Born: Anatoly Sobchak, Russian politician who co-authored the Constitution of the Russian Federation after the breakup of the Soviet Union, and served as the first democratically elected Mayor of Saint Petersburg; in Chita, Russian SFSR, Soviet Union. (d. 2000)

== August 11, 1937 (Wednesday) ==
- The Soviet Union began implementing NKVD Order No. 00485, the genocide of more than 111,000 members of the Polish minority confined to the Polish districts in the Byelorussian SSR and the Ukrainian SSR, and those still living with the Russian SFSR.
- On orders from Chiang Kai-shek, president of the Republic of China, several obsolete Chinese Navy ships were scuttled and allowed to sink in the Yangtze River to block Japanese ships from using the waterway. Among the former warships sunk were the cruisers Hai Yung, Hai Chi, Chao Ho, Hai Chen, Hai Chou, and Tung Chi; the gunboats Chu Chien, Ta Tung, and Tze Chiang; and the torpedo boats Chen Tse and Su Tse.
- In British India, Chakravarti Rajagopalachari, the Mootharignar Rajaji, premier of the Madras Presidency (now the state of Tamil Nadu), announced that he would introduce the mandatory teaching of the Hindi language in Madras schools, prompting the Anti-Hindi agitation by Tamil nationalists, led by Erode Venkatappa Ramasamy.
- The World Zionist Congress voted, 300–158, to oppose the Peel Commission plan to partition Palestine.
- The União Nacional dos Estudantes (UNE) student organization, which would have five million university students by 2025, was founded in Brazil.
- The biographical film The Life of Emile Zola starring Paul Muni premiered at the Carthay Circle Theatre in Los Angeles. The film would go on to win the Academy Award for Best Picture along with an award to Joseph Schildkraut for Best Supporting Actor, and Norman Reilly Raine and two others for Best Screenplay.
- Born:
  - Tan Joe Hok, Indonesian badminton player; in Bandung, Dutch East Indies (d.2025)
  - Dr. Hasri Ainun Habibie, Indonesian physician and wife of Indonesian President B. J. Habibie, 1998 to 1999; in Semarang, Dutch East Indies (d.2021)
- Died:
  - Edith Wharton, 75, American novelist and Pulitzer Prize winner known for The Age of Innocence
  - Royal Iraqi Army General Bakr Sidqi, 47, who had ordered the Simele massacre of 3,000 Assyrian civilians and separatists, was assassinated.

== August 12, 1937 (Thursday) ==
- U.S. Senator Hugo Black of Alabama was nominated by President Franklin D. Roosevelt to fill the vacancy left by the retirement of Willis Van Devanter. A series of investigative reports by Ray Sprigle of the Pittsburgh Post-Gazette, began on September 13, 1937, revealing that Black had been a long-time member of the white supremacist organization, the Ku Klux Klan, starting in 1923.
- The Spanish destroyer Churruca was torpedoed and damaged near Cartagena. The ship was able to limp into port but 3 crew were killed and 9 were injured.
- Mel Walker of the U.S. (high jumper) broke the record for the high jump during a meet in Sweden at Malmö. Miller cleared 2.09 m (6 ft 10 1/4 in), besting the previous mark of 2.07 m (6 ft 9 1/4 in) set in 1936 U.S. Olympic trials by Dave Albritton and Cornelius Johnson.
- Born:
  - Thommy Berggren, Swedish film star known for Heja Roland! and Elvira Madigan, winner of two Guldbagge Awards; in Mölndal
  - Walter Dean Myers, American writer of children's books; known for Monster (1999)Motown and Didi (1985); in Martinsburg, West Virginia (d.2014)
  - Jimmy Norman, American songwriter and singer; in Nashville, Tennessee (d.2011)
  - Roy Gaines, American blues guitarist; in Waskom, Texas (d.2021)

== August 13, 1937 (Friday) ==
- The Battle of Shanghai began in China as a clash between Shanghai's Chinese Peace Preservation Corps and the Imperial Japanese Army in the Zhabei, Wusong, and Jiangwan districts of the city. Six hours later, at 3:00 in the afternoon, Japanese troops crossed the Bazi Bridge at Zhabei and the 88th Division of China's National Revolutionary Army retaliated with mortar attacks. An hour later, ships of Japan's Third Fleet, stationed in the Yangtze and Huangpu rivers began shelling Chinese positions.
- Paraguay's President Rafael Franco was overthrown by the army in a coup d'état after withdrawing troops from the Chaco region in the aftermath of the Chaco War. The coup leaders replaced Colonel Franco with former Vice President Félix Paiva.
- The Spanish Republican freighter Conde de Absolo was sunk off Pantelleria by the Italian Navy destroyer Ostro. The 23-member crew was rescued by the British steamer City of Wellington.
- Died:
  - Walter Runciman, 1st Baron Runciman, 90, English shipping magnate
  - Frank Aguilar, 34, convicted American axe murderer, was executed in the gas chamber of the Colorado State Penitentiary in Canon City at 8:10 in the evening. One of the witnesses, Ed Hamilton, 55, died of a heart attack while watching the execution.
  - Boris Didkovsky, 54, Soviet professor at Ural State University, was executed by a gunshot wound to the head at the NKVD prison in Sverdlovsk as part of the Great Purge ordered by Soviet premier Joseph Stalin.

== August 14, 1937 (Saturday) ==
- In the Battle of Shanghai, over 1,200 Chinese civilians were killed and 1,400 injured when a bomber from China missed its target while attempting to attack Japanese ships in Shanghai harbor, and dropped bombs on the Great World amusement arcade.
- At the Battle of Jianqiao in China, Chinese pilots flying Model 68 Hawk III airplanes successfully defended Hangzhou from a Japanese attack, intercepting and shooting down four Japanese Mitsubishi G3M warplanes, without losing any of its own aircraft. August 14 would continue to be celebrated as Air Force Day in Taiwan more than 85 years later.
- The Battle of Santander began in Spain as Nationalist rebels, assisted by Italian and German officers, attacked the stronghold of the "Army of the North" of the Republic. The Santander fell after 12 days and after three weeks, the Republican forces of the 14th and 15th Army Corps lost 60,000 of their men.
- Born:
  - Winston Lord, U.S. government official who served as the president of the Council on Foreign Relations from 1977 to 1985, and as the U.S. Ambassador to China from 1985 to 1989; in New York City.
  - Joe Horlen, U.S. baseball pitcher who had the best earned run average in the American League in 1967, and the only baseball player to win the Pony League World Series (1952), the College World Series (1959 for Oklahoma State) and the 1972 World Series (for the Oakland A's); in San Antonio, Texas. (d. 2022)
- Died:
  - H. C. McNeile, MC, 48, British popular author who went by the pen name "Sapper" and was known for creating the series of mystery stories and the character "Bulldog Drummond", died from cancer at his home in West Chiltington, West Sussex.
  - Karl Pauker, 44, Soviet NKVD officer and former chief of Joseph Stalin's bodyguard team, was executed without a trial as part of the Great Purge.
  - Ivan Zaporozhets, 42, former Soviet NKVD officer accused of the assassination of Sergei Kirov, was executed after a confession under torture of having been part of a right-wing conspiracy against the government.
  - Semyon Firin, 39, Soviet Gulag forced labor camp director at the Dmitrovsky Correctional Labor Camp (Dmitlag), was executed by shooting on charges of "participating in an Operational-Chekist coup to prepare a palace revolution".
  - Leopold Averbakh, 34, Soviet literary critic, was executed along with Semyon Firin.

== August 15, 1937 (Sunday) ==
- A military coup d'état overthrew Paraguay's President Rafael Franco. Former President Félix Paiva was sworn into office as the new President of Paraguay.
- The Imperial Japanese Navy Air Service launched its campaign of bombing Nanjing in China, attacking the Jurong Airbase with it fast moving G3M warplanes and blitz techniques developed by Giulio Douhet. The Japanese eventually lost 50% of its planes in fighting at Jurong with the unexpected response by the Chinese Air Force.
- The Shanghai Expeditionary Army was raised a second time.
- Born:
  - Zivko Radisic, Serbian politician who served twice (1998-1999 and 2000-2001) as the chairperson of the Presidency of Bosnia and Herzegovina, the three-member collective head of state of that nation; in Prijedor, Kingdom of Yugoslavia (d. 2021)
  - John "Hoppy" Hopkins, English photographer and political activist; in Slough, Berkshire (d.2015)

== August 16, 1937 (Monday) ==
- AFRA. the American Federation of Radio Artists was founded as the broadcasting counterpart to the Screen Actors Guild (SAG). Created by members of Radio Equity and the Radio Actors Guild, the new union was granted a charter by the Associated Actors and Artistes of America and elected Eddie Cantorj, star of The Chase and Sanborn Hour, as its first president. It would add television employees on September 17, 1952 by a merger with the Television Authority and change its name from AFRA to AFTRA. The organization would merge on March 30, 2012 with the Screen Actors Guild to become SAG-AFTRA.
- The Polish peasant strike, organized by the People's Party and led by Stanisław Mikołajczyk, Wincenty Witos and Felicjan Slawoj-Skladkowski began, and lasted until August 25.
- In the Soviet Union, Vlas Chubar became the new People's Commissar for Finance to replace finance minister Hryhoriy Hrynko, who had been fired from the job on July 22.
- A general mobilization of the military was ordered in Japan.
- Born:
  - József Madaras, Romanian-born Hungarian film actor known for Season of Monsters (Szörnyek évadja) and Köszönöm, megvagyunk (Thank you, we'll be fine); in Rigmani (d. 2007)
  - Uncle Elmer (ring name for Stanley Frazier), American professional wrestler; in Philadelphia, Mississippi (d. 1992)

== August 17, 1937 (Tuesday) ==
- The Japanese invasion of Shanghai became a takeover of the Chinese port, as the Japanese military commandeered the 19-story Broadway Mansions luxury apartments at 11:00 in the morning and ordered all non-Japanese residents to leave. The British ships HMS Falmouth and Duncan evacuated over 2,000 British women and children from Shanghai to Wusong for transfer to Hong Kong.
- The U.S. Senate confirmed Hugo Black for the United States Supreme Court by a 63–16 vote despite his controversial past involvement with the Ku Klux Klan. Black would serve on the Supreme Court until his retirement in 1971.
- Jamil Al Midfai returned to office as Prime Minister of Iraq when Premier Hikmat Sulayman resigned, six days after the assassination of General Bakr Sidqi.
- Matvei Berman, director of the gulag, the Soviet Union's network of forced labor prison camps since 1932, was removed from office and replaced by his deputy, Israel Pliner. Berman was temporarily transferred to the job as People's Commissar of Posts and Telecommunications but would be arrested on December 23, 1938, sent to the Lubyanka prison and executed.
- Red Army General Konstantin Rokossovsky was arrested and imprisoned on charges of espionage during the Great Purge of Soviet officials by Joseph Stalin. Unlike many of the people arrested during the Great Purge, General Rokossovsky avoided execution and would be restored to his command in 1940, becoming a Marshal of the Soviet Union and later being Defense Minister of Poland and that nation's Deputy Prime Minister.
- Former Soviet Finance Minister Hryhoriy Hrynko, who had been fired on July 22, was arrested and charged with being part of the "anti-Soviet right-wing Trotskyist bloc". After his deputy and successor, Vlas Chubar, reported that Hrynko's administration had led to a collapse of state finances, Hrynko would be executed on March 15, 1938. Chubar himself was arrested four months later and would be executed on February 26, 1939.
- Born:
  - Cardinal Michael Fitzgerald, English Roman Catholic archbishop and envoy for the Vatican in mediation of disputes in Christian and Muslim relations in the Middle East; in Walsall, Staffordshire
  - George Beall VIII, U.S. federal prosecutor who brought charges and an indictment that forced U.S. Vice President Spiro Agnew to resign in 1973; in Frostburg, Maryland (d.2017)
  - Spiros Focás, Greek film and TV actor known for Messalina; in Patras (d.2023)
  - Alan B. Miller, U.S. businessman known for founding (in 1979) Universal Health Services, provider of hospital and healthcare services in the U.S. and the UK; in Brooklyn
  - Diego Seguí, Cuban-born baseball player who played in the U.S. (where he had the best ERA in the American League in 1970, in Mexico and in Venezuela (where he was inducted to the Venezuelan Baseball Hall of Fame; in Holguín (d. 2025)
- Died: Yen Hai-Wen, 21, of the Republic of China Air Force parachuted out of his fighter plane during a bombing mission against Japanese Command Headquarters at Shanghai, shot at several Japanese soldiers with his pistol to avoid capture, and then shouted "The Chinese Air Force never surrenders!" before using his last bullet to kill himself. The Japanese military was so impressed by his courage that, despite the fact that Yen was an enemy combatant, had him buried with full military honors and erected a monument to him.

== August 18, 1937 (Wednesday) ==
- The U.S. government ordered all 12,600 American citizens in China to evacuate.
- The Blackwater fire was started by a lightning strike in Shoshone National Forest in the U.S. state of Wyoming, but was not detected until two days later, when it rapidly expanded.
- The musical film Broadway Melody of 1938, starring Eleanor Powell, Robert Taylor, and Judy Garland in a star-making role, premiered at Grauman's Chinese Theatre in Hollywood.
- Born:
  - Jean Alingué Bawoyeu, Prime Minister of Chad from 1991 to 1992; in Fort-Lamy, French Equatorial Africa (now N'Djamena in Chad)
  - Willie Rushton, English cartoonist and comedian; in Chelsea, London (d. 1996)
- Died: Luigi Pernier, 62, Italian archaeologist and academic

== August 19, 1937 (Thursday) ==
- The Valsadornín Hoard, with 45 kilograms (99 lb) of silver and copper coins used in the Roman Empire in the 3rd century, was discovered 1,760 years after it had been buried in the Roman province of Hispania Tarraconensis (now the Province of Palencia in Spain) near the town of Valsadornín. The treasure was spotted by brother and sister Tomás and Eusebia Roldán of the village of Gramedo as they were walking along the road and found the remains of the container that had been unearthed by heavy rains.
- Nazi Germany restricted Jewish booksellers to only selling books by Jewish authors to Jewish customers.
- Portugal severed diplomatic relations with Czechoslovakia over a broken armaments contract. Czechoslovakia broke the contract because it suspected Portugal of funneling the arms to the Nationalists in Spain.
- Born:
  - Henry Caldera, blind Sri Lankan singer and songwriter; in Maradana, British Ceylon (d.2006)
  - Alexander Vampilov, Soviet Russian playwright known for Farewell in June; in Kutulik, Russian SFSR, Soviet Union (drowned 1972)
- Died:
  - Ikki Kita, 54, Japanese author and philosopher, was executed for his participation on February 26, 1936, in an attempted coup d'état.
  - Ivan Kataev, 35, Soviet Russian novelist and journalist, was executed the same day after he was convicted on charges of participation in an anti-Soviet counter-revolutionary terrorist organization.
  - Alexander Hotovitzky, 65, Russian Orthodox priest, was executed in prison in the Soviet Union.
  - Ferdinand Faivre, 76, French sculptor

== August 20, 1937 (Friday) ==
- In Shanghai, an anti-aircraft shell landed on the deck of the heavy cruiser USS Augusta and exploded, killing one American sailor and wounding 18.
- Dixie Bibb Graves, the wife of Alabama Governor Bibb Graves, was appointed by her husband as one of the state's U.S. senators, in order to fill the vacancy caused by the resignation of Hugo Black, who had been confirmed as a justice of the U.S. Supreme Court. While other women had been appointed as U.S. Senators to fill a vacancy caused by the death in office of a husband, Mrs. Graves was the fourth woman to serve as a United States Senator and the first appointee whose husband was still alive. She served the remainder of Black's term until a special election could be held on January 4.
- The Australian Institute of Librarians was founded at a meeting of 55 librarians from across the nation at Albert Hall in Canberra.
- Vatslaw Lastowski, the former Prime Minister of the Belarusian Democratic Republic prior to its annexation into the USSR as the Byelorussian SSR was arrested on charges of being “an agent of the Polish intelligence service and participant of the national-fascist organisation”. He would be executed on January 23, 1938.
- Born:
  - Jim Bowen, English comedian and television personality known for hosting the ITV game show Bullseye; in Heswall (d. 2018)
  - Jean-Louis Petit, French composer, conductor and organist
  - Andrei Konchalovsky (pen name for Andrei Sergeyevich Mikhailkov), Soviet Russian film and theater director, known for Tango & Cash in the U.S. and Siberiade in the Soviet Union; in Moscow

== August 21, 1937 (Saturday) ==
- The Sino-Soviet Non-Aggression Pact was signed in Nanjing between the Republic of China and the Soviet Union for the provision of Soviet aircraft and weapons to China during China's war with Japan.
- Resolution No. 1428-326cc, directing the deportation of all USSR citizens of Korean descent from the Russian SFSR, was approved by the Council of People's Commissars of the Soviet Union and signed by Prime Minister Vyacheslav Molotov. By the end of the year, more than 200,000 ethnic Koreans would be forcibly resettled to the Uzbek SSR and the Kazakh SSR.
- Philippine President Manuel L. Quezon issued Proclamation No. 173, urging Filipinos to welcome Jewish refugees who had formerly lived in Shanghai in China, which had previously accepted German Jews who had been fleeing persecution.
- In the U.S., 15 firefighters in Wyoming were killed while fighting the Blackwater Fire in Shoshone National Forest. Nine died immediately and six others were fatally burned.
- The Spanish village of Villacarriedo fell to the Nationalists of Francisco Franco in advance of the Battle of Santander.
- Born:
  - Gustavo Noboa, President of Ecuador from 2000 to 2003 (d. 2021)
  - Donald Dewar, Scottish politician who served as the inaugural First Minister of Scotland from 1999 until his death; in Glasgow (d. 2000)
  - Joe Morrison, American football player and coach; in Lima, Ohio (d. 1989)
  - Robert Stone, American novelist known for Dog Soldiers; in Brooklyn, New York (d. 2015)
  - Chuck Traynor, American pornography film promoter and actor; in Westchester County, New York (d. 2002)
- Died:
  - George Wright, 90, American baseball player and inductee to the Baseball Hall of Fame
  - Artur Artuzov, 46, Soviet spy and former director of counterintelligence at the NKVD, was executed three months after he had been arrested at work and accused of "participation in a counter-revolutionary conspiratorial organization within the NKVD".
  - Adolf Warski, 69, was executed in the Soviet Union on charges of being the leader of the Polish Military Organization.
  - Edward Próchniak, 48, co-founder of the Communist Party of Poland, was executed in the Soviet Union six weeks after being arrested on charges of being an agent of the Polish Military Organization

== August 22, 1937 (Sunday) ==
- Voters in the nation of Liechtenstein chose overwhelmingly to ban department stores within their European principality's borders. The vote in the tiny nation was 1,294 in favor of the ban and 896 against. The vote came after the Migros chain of stores had opened its first sales outlet in Vaduz in the spring, and the Liechtenstein government approved the referendum unanimously on June 24. The ban would remain in place for 32 years until the passage of the Trade Act on December 10, 1969.
- Raja, a 24-year-old Sri Lankan elephant who would be designated as a national treasure of Sri Lanka, was given to the Temple of the Tooth in the city of Kandy. Raja, one of the most celebrated elephants in Asia during his lifetime, would participate in the annual Kandy Esala Perahera festival in Kandy for the next 50 years until his death in 1988 at the age of 75.
- Manfred von Brauchitsch of Germany won the Monaco Grand Prix.
- Rudolf Caracciola of Germany won the Swiss Grand Prix.
- Born:
  - Rifaat al-Assad, Syrian military officer during the presidency of his older brother Hafez al-Assad, known for carrying out the 1982 Hama massacre of as many as 57,000 Sunni Muslims in the city of Hama; in Qardaha (d. 2026)
  - Pilita Corrales, Filipino singer, actress and comedian; in Cebu City (d.2025)
- Died:
  - Gelegdorjiin Demid, 37, Minister of War of the Mongolian People's Republic, died while riding on a train to Moscow on the Trans-Siberian Railway, en route to a meeting with Joseph Stalin. His death was attributed by his successor, Khorloogiin Choibalsan, to "food poisoning."
  - Pedro Durruti, 26, Spanish anarchist, was executed by a Falangist firing squad after being convicted of rebelling against the Francoist government. His death certificate stated that he died of "cardiac arrest".

== August 23, 1937 (Monday) ==
- The new Metro-Goldwyn-Mayer cartoon studio opened its doors.
- Died: Albert Roussel, 68, French composer

== August 24, 1937 (Tuesday) ==
- In one the few instances of a U.S. national monument being discontinued, the Lewis and Clark Caverns, given protective status by the federal government on May 11, 1908, was dropped from the National Park Service. Ownership was transferred on April 22, 1938, to the state of Montana, which made the caverns Montana's first state park.
- King Farouk of Egypt announced his engagement to a commoner, Safinaz Zulficar, who would take the name of Queen Farida upon their marriage on January 20, 1938.
- Fifteen days after his discovery of a different supernova, astronomer Fritz Zwicky became the first person on earth to observe the supernova (SN 1937C) in the Magellanic spiral galaxy IC 4182 (visible within the constellation Canes Venatici). Based on the estimated distance in light years, the event had happened at least 11 million years earlier.
- The Santoña Agreement was signed at Guriezo between politicians of Spain's Basque Nationalist Party, who were fighting to defend the Republic in the Spanish Civil War, and Italy's Corpo Truppe Volontarie forces who were fighting for the Nationalists led by Francisco Franco. Under the agreement, the Basque units of the Spanish Republican Army (with more than 22,000 soldiers) surrendered to the Nationalists. Franco canceled the agreement the next day and ordered the soldiers held a prisoners of war at the El Dueso prison camp.
- The Spanish Republic launched the Zaragoza Offensive, starting with the two-week Battle of Belchite. While the Republic was successful at Belchite, the Zaragoza offensive would fail to stop the nationalist advance.

== August 25, 1937 (Wednesday) ==
- The Brotherhood of Sleeping Car Porters, the largest labor union of black workers in North America, entered into a historic contract with the Pullman Company, raising the wages of porters and maids, setting limits on required labor to 240 hours per month, providing time-and-a-half hourly overtime pay once a worker had worked 260 hours in a calendar month, and paying for the costs of uniforms for all porters who had worked for at least 10 years.
- The National Library of the Islamic Republic of Iran, now the largest library in the Middle East with more than 15,000,000 items in its collections, was established in Tehran, capital of the Imperial State of Iran.
- The Soviet Union's security police, the NKVD, began the "Polish Operation" (Pol'skaya operatsiya), a 15-month campaign to arrest, imprison and eliminate more than 110,000 Soviet Union residents of Polish ancestry, one-fifth of that Soviet minority group. While some found refuge in neighboring Poland, the NKVD tallied the execution of 111,091 members of the Polish minority in carrying our NKVD Order No. 00485 ("On the liquidation of the Polish diversionist and espionage groups and POW units") signed by NKVD Director Nikolai Yezhov on August 11, 1937, after approval by the Communist Party Politburo on August 9.
- In Nazi Germany, the gauleiter and Oberpräsident of East Prussia, Erich Koch, began a campaign to revise more than 1,500 place names of non-German origin, ordering a commission within the Prussian Ministry of Science, Education and People's Education to prepare a list of locations and their recommendations for a German-sounding name. The changes were required to take place on July 16, 1938. As examples, "Szitkehmen" became Judendorf ("Jewish village"), "Pablindszen" became Zollteich ("customs pond"), and "Gollubien" became Unterfelde ("underfields").

== August 26, 1937 (Thursday) ==
- British ambassador to China Hughe Knatchbull-Hugessen was wounded when a Japanese plane strafed and attacked his limousine.
- Turkey warned that any submarines that entered the Turkish Straits without identifying themselves would be attacked.
- Mysterious attacks began on neutral shipping bound for Republican ports.
- Born:
  - Kenji Utsumi, Japanese actor and voice actor; in Kitakyushu (d. 2013)
  - Gennady Yanayev, Soviet politician; in Perevoz, Nizhny Novgorod Oblast, USSR (d. 2010)
- Died: Andrew Mellon, 82, American businessman, ambassador and U.S. Secretary of the Treasury

== August 27, 1937 (Friday) ==
- The Kwantung Army occupied Zhangjiakou, capital of China's Chahar Province. After Chahar became a Japanese-dominated "autonomous province" for the remainder of the war, Zhangjiakou would become part of the Heibei province.
- Two employees of the 20th Century Fox studios— prop man Philo Goodfriend and camera grip Harry Harsha— were killed, and two others injured when a 1,500 pounds (680 kg) platform, used for filming "magic carpet" scenes in the comedy film Ali Baba Goes to Town, fell when one of the piano wires holding it up snapped. Harsha and two other workmen, J. B. Bowman and Nick De Genner were on the platform, while Goodfriend was crushed on the studio floor. Harsha died the next day.
- "El Salón México", a symphony composed by Aaron Copland with four melodies drawn from Mexican folk music, was given its first performance as the Mexico Symphony Orchestra premiered the peace with Carlos Chávez as conductor.
- Born:
  - Alice Coltrane, American jazz musician and Hindu spiritual leader; in Detroit, Michigan (d. 2007)
  - J. D. Crowe, American bluegrass musician and banjo player; in Lexington, Kentucky (d.2021)
  - Vladimir Ionesyan, Soviet Armenian axe murderer who committed five random killings over a period of less than three weeks in 1964; in Tbilisi, Georgian SSR, Soviet Union (executed, 1964)

== August 28, 1937 (Saturday) ==
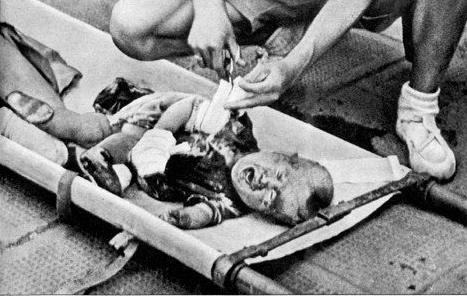
The baby receiving treatment after the Bloody Saturday photograph was taken

- H. S. Wong (Wong Ha-sheng) took the famous Bloody Saturday newsreel and photograph, showing a baby crying in the bombed-out ruins of a Shanghai railway station after it was destroyed by Japanese bombers. The photo was published and the newsreel shown in theaters worldwide, and stirred outrage against Japan. Although Wong was subsequently accused of staging the photograph, other pictures taken by him showed the baby being treated by a boy scout at the scene. Wong never learned the name or gender of the baby, or whether the child had survived the injury.
- Toyota Motor Corporation, the largest automobile manufacturer in the world, was incorporated by Kiichiro Toyoda in Japan. Automobile manufacturing had started in 1933 by the Toyoda Automatic Loom Works, Ltd., which had been created by Kiichiro's father, Sakichi Toyoda, for the production of his invention, an automatic loom for the purpose of weaving cloth, and the first Toyota vehicle, the Toyota G1 truck, had been introduced on November 21, 1935.
- The Vatican recognized Francoist Spain and sent an apostolic delegate.
- English athlete Sydney Wooderson set a new world record at Motspur Park by running one mile in 4 minutes 6.6 seconds, breaking the record of 4:06.8 set by Glenn Cunningham in 1934.
- Died: Owen Burns, 67, American entrepreneur and land developer who purchased and developed the majority of the land now in Sarasota, Florida

== August 29, 1937 (Sunday) ==
- Britain sent a sharp note of protest to the Japanese government demanding a formal apology for the wounding of their ambassador.
- Born: James Florio, 49th Governor of New Jersey; in Brooklyn, New York (d. 2022)

== August 30, 1937 (Monday) ==
- The Royal Italian Navy submarine Iride, on a mission to attack Spanish Nationalist ships during the Spanish Civil War, fired a torpedo at the British Royal Navy destroyer HMS Havock. The British ship avoided the torpedo with a sharp turn to starboard and for the next nine hours, Havock was joined by the destroyers HMS Active, HMS Hyperion and HMS Hotspur, and the cruiser HMS Galatea in dropping depth charges. Though all ships escaped the battle unscathed, Iride surfaced long enough to be identified, leading to the Nyon Conference the following month.
- Joe Louis retained boxing's World Heavyweight Championship with a 15-round decision over Tommy Farr at Yankee Stadium.
- The Russian freighter Timiryazev was torpedoed and sunk near Dellys by two Royal Italian Navy destroyers, Turbine and Ostro. All 30 crew were rescued by a fishing boat.
- The Brazilian company Ultragaz, the South American nation's largest distributor of liquefied petroleum gas, was founded by Austrian-born Brazilian businessman, as Empresa Brasileira de Gáz a Domicílio.
- Eberhard von Stohrer was appointed the new German ambassador to the Spanish Nationalist government.
- Born:
  - Roy de Silva (stage name for Chathurartha Devadithya Gardiyawasam Lindamulage Roy Aloysius Felix de Silva), Sri Lankan film director known for the Re Daniel Dawal Migel comedy film series and the Cheriyo film series; in Yatawatta, British Ceylon (d.2018)
  - Bruce McLaren, New Zealand endurance car driver, 1966 winner of Formula One World Constructors' Championship titles 24 Hours of Le Mans; in Auckland (killed in a crash, 1970)
  - Mpinga Kasenda, Prime Minister of Zaire from 1977 to 1978, and its foreign minister from 1993 to 1994 (killed in airplane crash, 1994).
- Died: Adele Sandrock, 74, Dutch-born German stage and film actress

== August 31, 1937 (Tuesday) ==
- The Société nationale des chemins de fer français (SNCF), which operates France's railway system, was created by an agreement between the French government and most of the private railway companies in France, including Nord, PLM, PO, Midi, and Est, as well as the Grande Ceinture and Petite Ceinture railway unions, and the national administrations of the Alsace and Lorraine railways and the state railways.
- The first patent for a process for creating biodiesel fuel was granted to Belgian chemist Georges Chavanne of the University of Brussels, who received Belgian patent No. 422,877 for a "Procedure for the transformation of vegetable oils for their uses as fuels".
- Actors Tallulah Bankhead and John Emery were married in Jasper, Alabama.
- Born: Bobby Parker, American blues-rock musician; in Lafayette, Louisiana (d. 2013)
