= NGC 5112 =

Galaxy in the constellation Canes Venatici

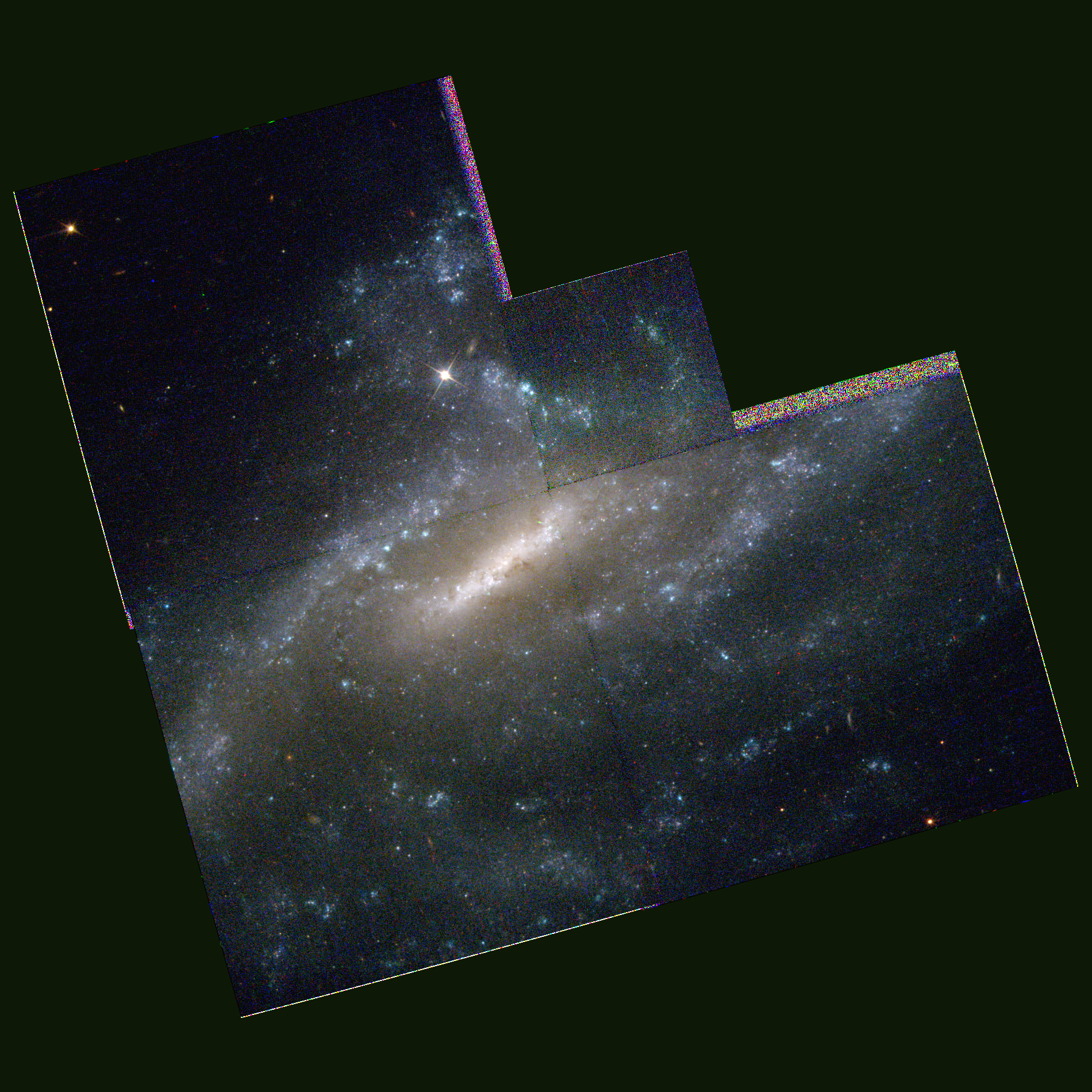
- NGC 5112 imaged by the Hubble Space Telescope

Observation data (J2000 epoch)
- Constellation: Canes Venatici
- Right ascension: 13^{h} 21^{m} 56.4374^{s}
- Declination: +38° 44′ 04.462″
- Redshift: 0.003249
- Heliocentric radial velocity: 974 ± 1 km/s
- Distance: 60.49 ± 6.52 Mly (18.546 ± 1.999 Mpc)
- Apparent magnitude (V): 14.2

Characteristics
- Type: SB(rs)cd
- Size: ~70,400 ly (21.58 kpc) (estimated)
- Apparent size (V): 4.0′ × 2.8′

Other designations
- IRAS 13196+3859, UGC 8403, MCG +07-28-003, PGC 46671, CGCG 218-005

NGC 5112 is a barred spiral galaxy in the constellation Canes Venatici. It was discovered on 17 March 1787 by German-British astronomer William Herschel. This galaxy is in close physical proximity to the edge-on dwarf spiral NGC 5107.

On 4 March 2015, a supernova candidate, designated PSN J13215756+3843229, was discovered in NGC 5112 by Robert Gagliano, Dick Post, Jack Newton, and Tim Puckett. Spectral analysis suggested that it was instead a supernova imposter, possibly an outburst from a luminous blue variable. An outburst from this star was observed by GOTO on 4 May 2025, and designated AT 2025jsi.

== NGC 5005 Group ==
According to A. M. Garcia, NGC 5112 is part of the NGC 5005 group (also known as LGG 334). This group of galaxies contains at least 16 members. The other galaxies in the group are: NGC 4861, NGC 5002, NGC 5005, NGC 5014, NGC 5033, NGC 5107, IC 4182, IC 4213, UGC 8181, UGC 8246, UGC 8261, UGC 8303, UGC 8314, UGC 8315, and UGC 8323.

== See also ==
- List of NGC objects (5001–6000)
