= Celada de Roblecedo =

Coordinates: 42.9453°N 4.4317°W

- Nickname: Celada
- Interactive map of Celada de Roblecedo
- Country: Spain
- Autonomous community: Castile and León
- Province: Palencia
- Municipality: Celada de Roblecedo

Government
- Elevation: 1,200 m (3,900 ft)

Population (2004)
  - Total: 19
- Time zone: UTC+1 (CET)
  - Summer (DST): UTC+2 (CEST)

Celada de Roblecedo (Spanish: Celada de Roblecedo) is a town in the province of Palencia, in Castille and León, northern Spain.

It is in the south part of Sierra de Híjar and 15 km from Cervera de Pisuerga, the municipal capital, in the region of Palencia Mountain.

== Demography ==
According to the NSI, on 1 January 2012 the population was 19.

== History ==
Before the fall of the Ancien Régime it had 78 houses and 198 inhabitants.

Between the census of 1981 and the previous one, the municipality disappeared and, along with Estalaya, San Felices de Castillería and Verdeña, became part of Cervera de Pisuerga.

== Economy ==
Celada de Roblecedo was historically agricultural. The first industries appeared here in the twentieth century by the hand of Vitor, the mayor on that time; today it is basically becoming a residential area for the summer. As in the rest of the region, livestock and forestry were once the primary economical activities of the area. There are still important sheep and cattle farms here, in some of which meat is constantly being sold. The beekeeping sector is growing in importance, with the production of honey and derivatives, which are promoted by the mayor

== Villages ==
The villages in the area are:

- San Felices de Castilleria
- Verdeña
- Estalaya
- Herreruela

These are smaller villages which maintain contact with Celada by road.

== Notes ==
Attractions include the Tele Club where young people stay, the romanesque church, and the Vitor's Museum which is in the middle of the village.
