= Verdeña =

Human settlement in Cervera de Pisuerga, Palencia Province, Castile and León, Spain

Coordinates: 42°56′33″N 4°27′42″W

- Human settlement
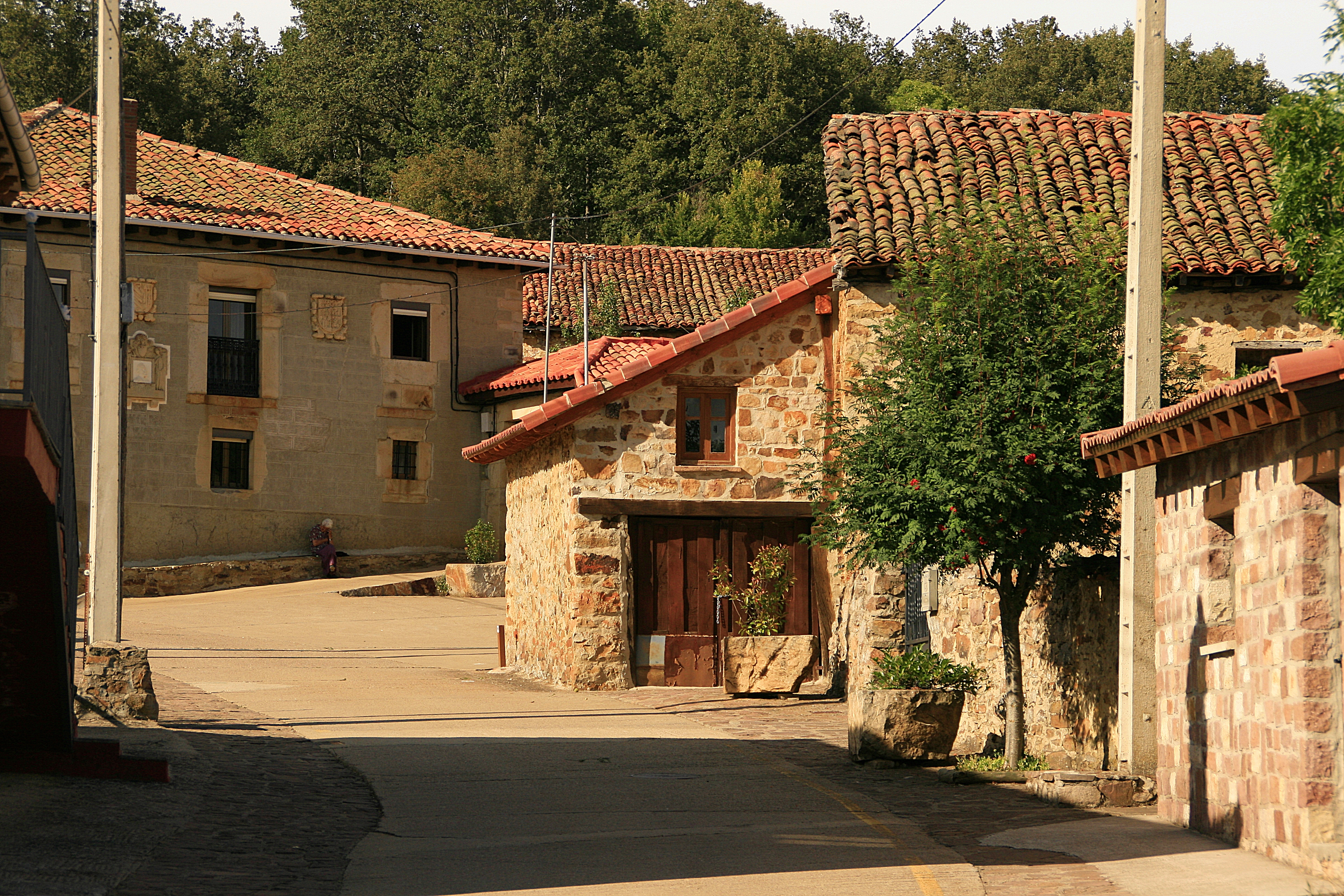

- Comarca: Montaña Palentina
- Municipality: Cervera de Pisuerga
- Province: Palencia
- Autonomous community: Castile and León

Population (2020)
  - Total: 10
- Postal code: 34846
- Area code: 34

Verdeña is a settlement in the province of Palencia (Castile and León, Spain) and is part of the municipality of Cervera de Pisuerga.

== Geographical context ==
It is part, along with Estalaya, Celada de Roblecedo, San Felices de Castillería and Herreruela de Castillería, of the Castillería Valley.

It is 15 km from Cervera de Pisuerga, the municipal capital, in the region of Montaña Palentina. It is located in a mountainous area (lat.42º57'ON; long.4º28'OW), at 1239 m altitude.

== Demography ==
Population evolution in the 21st century

Year	Pop.	±%
2000	16	—
2001	15	−6.2%
2002	15	+0.0%
2003	24	+60.0%
2004	23	−4.2%
2005	23	+0.0%
2006	20	−13.0%

Year	Pop.	±%
2007	21	+5.0%
2008	20	−4.8%
2009	16	−20.0%
2010	16	+0.0%
2011	14	−12.5%
2012	12	−14.3%
2013	11	−8.3%

Year	Pop.	±%
2014	12	+9.1%
2015	7	−41.7%
2016	7	+0.0%
2017	9	+28.6%
2018	9	+0.0%
2019	10	+11.1%

Legal population (2000-2019), according to the municipal census of the National Institute of Statistics.

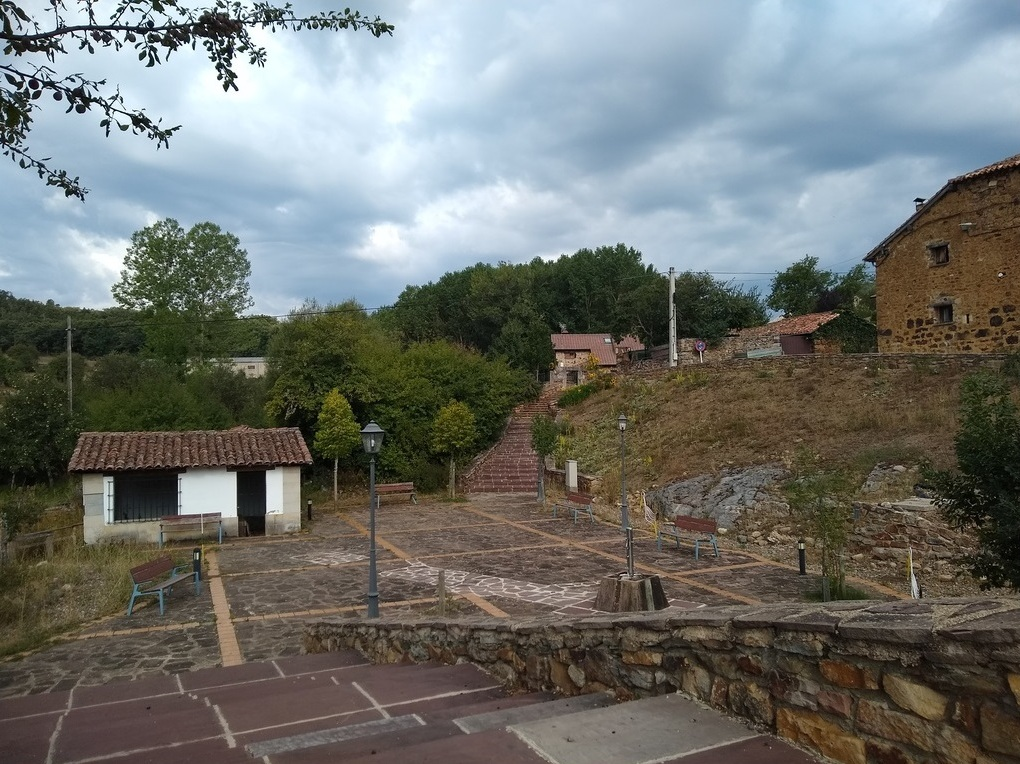
Park next to a parking lot

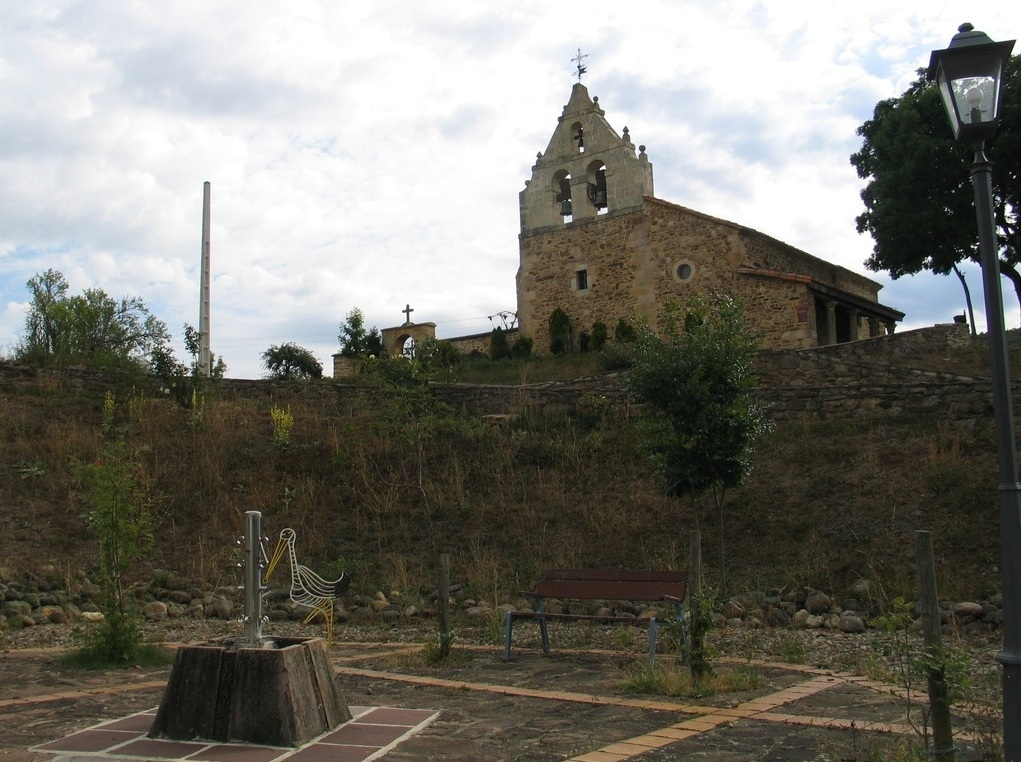
Parochial church

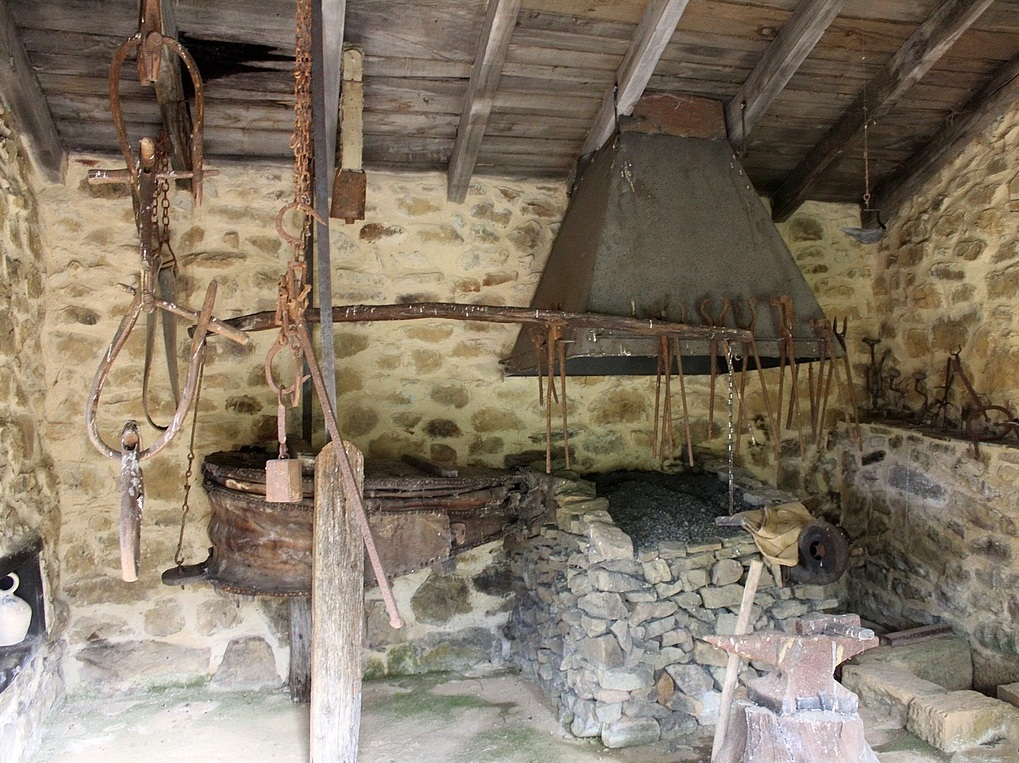
Inside of a forge

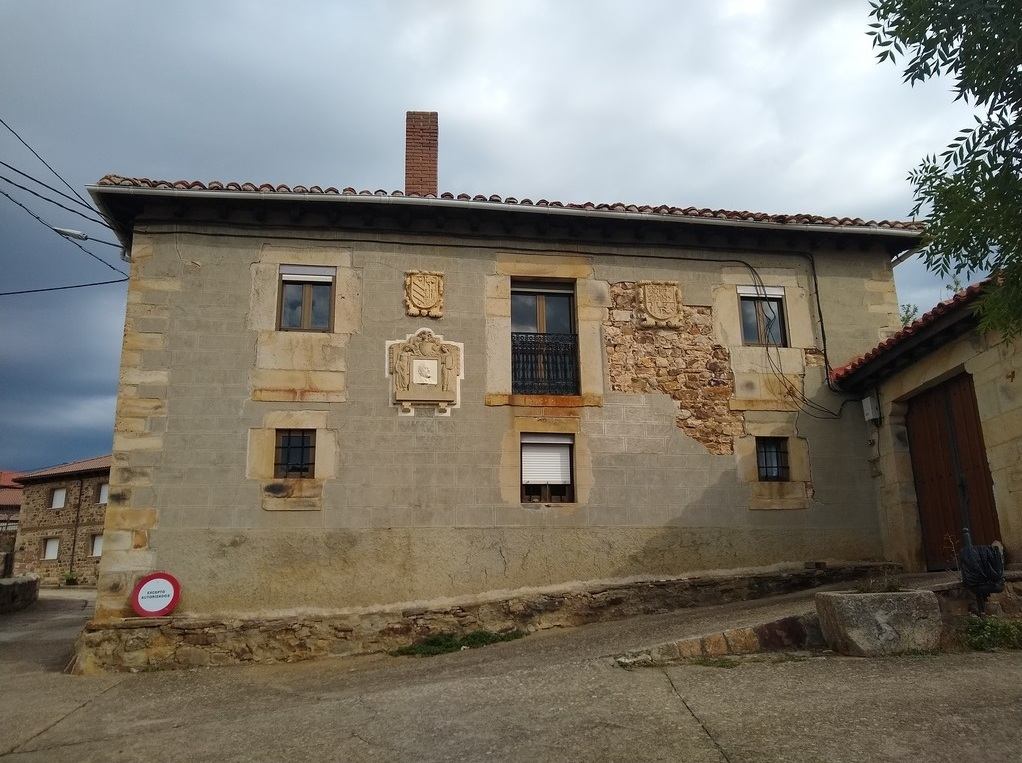
Natal house of Matías Barrio y Mier

== History ==
At the fall of the Ancien Régime, the town became a constitutional municipality and in the 1842 census it had 12 households and 62 residents, to later become part of Celada de Roblecedo.

The town was the birthplace of Matías Barrio y Mier (10-02-1844), doctor in Law and graduate in Philosophy and Letters and Theology. He studied as an archivist, librarian and antiquarian at the Escuela Superior Diplomática. He was a lawyer, professor at the University of Alcalá and prosecutor. He was also a legislator and president of the Carlist minority in the Congress of Deputies. He also devoted himself to writing. He died in Madrid (26-06-1909), and his mortal remains rest in the Verdeña cemetery.

=== 19th century ===
This is how Verdeña is described on page 672 of volume XV of the Diccionario geográfico-estadístico-histórico de España y sus posesiones de Ultramar, a work promoted by Pascual Madoz in the mid-19th century:

VERDEÑA

A place attached to the municipality of San Felices de Castillería in the province and diocese of Palencia (20 leagues), judicial district of Cervera de Río Pisuerga (2), territorial audience and general captaincy of Valladolid (28).

Located in a valley surrounded by slopes with a cold climate, well ventilated and prone to flank pains and colds.

It consists of 26 houses of few comforts; school some seasons, and a parish church served by a priest of provision of the ordinary.

The term bordered by N with Monte and sale of San Bartolomé; E Celada; S Estalaya, and W Venta Morena.

Its land enjoys mountain and plain, and is moderately productive.

The roads are local and bad.

Productions: wheat, barley, rye, oats and grass; raising sheep, cattle and horses; hunting hares, partridges, wolves and roe deer.

Industry: agriculture and livestock.

Population: 12 neighbors, 62 souls.

Productive capital: 19,188 reales. Taxable: 969 reales.

== See also ==
- Montaña Palentina Natural Park
- Montaña Palentina
