= NGC 5033 =

Galaxy in the constellation Canes Venatici

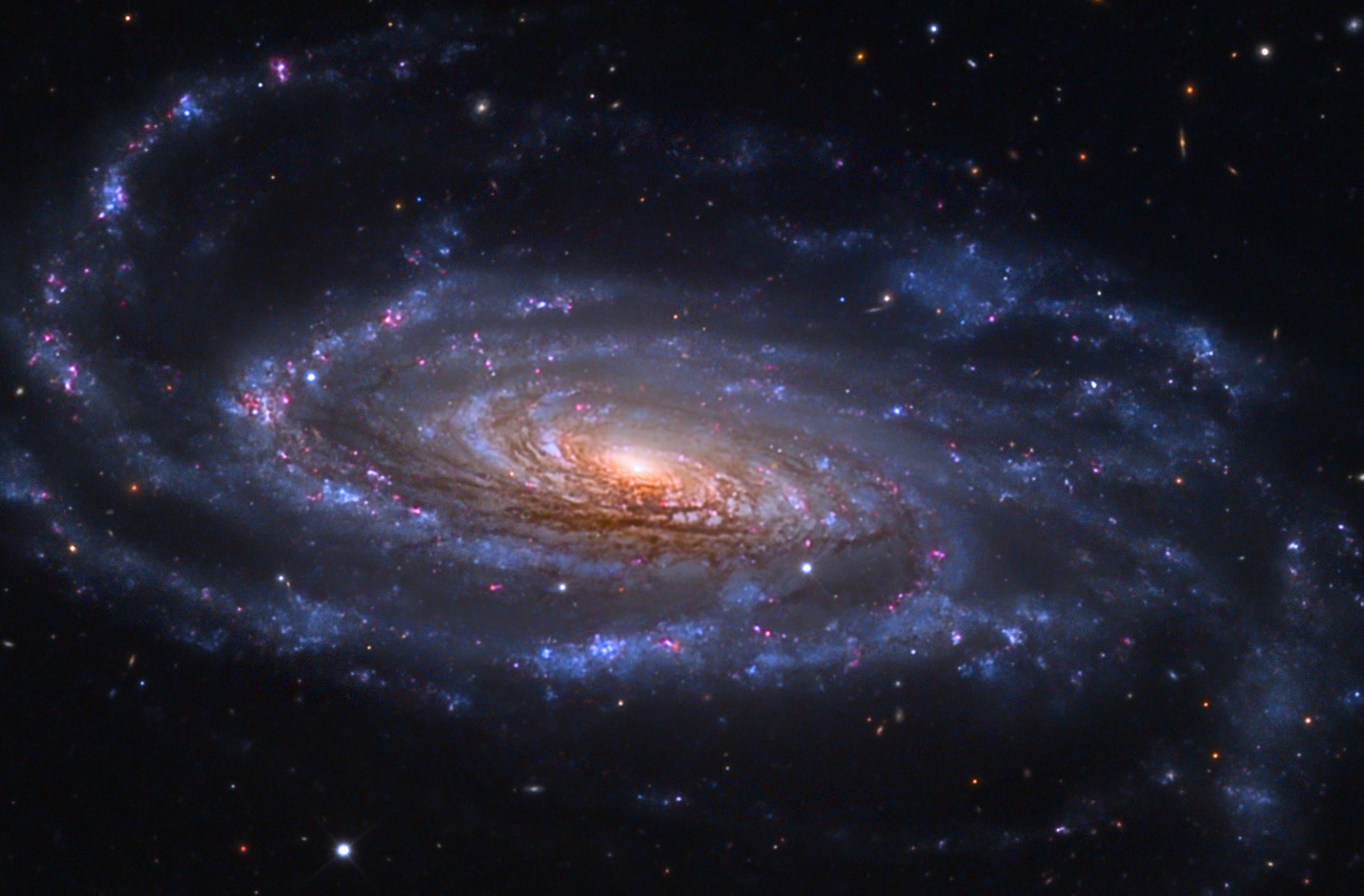
- NGC 5033 imaged by the Mount Lemmon Observatory

Observation data (J2000 epoch)
- Constellation: Canes Venatici
- Right ascension: 13^{h} 13^{m} 27.4737^{s}
- Declination: +36° 35′ 38.119″
- Redshift: 0.002912±0.000002
- Heliocentric radial velocity: 873±1 km/s
- Distance: 53.71 ± 4.38 Mly (16.468 ± 1.344 Mpc)
- Apparent magnitude (V): 10.75

Characteristics
- Type: SA(s)c
- Size: ~179,700 ly (55.09 kpc) (estimated)
- Apparent size (V): 10.7′ × 5.0′

Other designations
- IRAS 13111+3651, UGC 8307, MCG +06-29-062, PGC 45948, CGCG 189-043

NGC 5033, also known as the Waterbug Galaxy, is an inclined spiral galaxy located in the constellation Canes Venatici. Its velocity with respect to the cosmic microwave background is 1,101±16 km/s, which corresponds to a Hubble distance of 53.0 ± 3.8 Mly (16.24 ± 1.16 Mpc). Additionally, 25 non-redshift measurements give a similar distance of 53.71 ± 4.38 Mly (16.468 ± 1.344 Mpc). It was discovered by German-British astronomer William Herschel on 1 May 1785.

NGC 5033 has a very bright nucleus and a relatively faint disk. Significant warping is visible in the southern half of the disk. The galaxy's relatively large angular size and relatively high surface brightness make it an object that can be viewed and imaged by amateur astronomers. The galaxy's location relatively near Earth and its active galactic nucleus make it a commonly studied object for professional astronomers.

== Supernovae ==
Four supernovae have been observed in NGC 5033:

- SN 1950C (type unknown, mag. 18.2) was discovered by Fritz Zwicky on 14 May 1950.
- SN 1985L (Type II, mag. 12.5) was discovered by Natalya Metlova on 13 June 1985.
- SN 2001gd (Type IIb, mag. 16.5) was discovered by Kōichi Itagaki and Alessandro Dimai on 24 November 2001.
- SN 2025mvn (Type II, mag. 17.912) was discovered by ATLAS on 3 June 2025.

== Nucleus ==
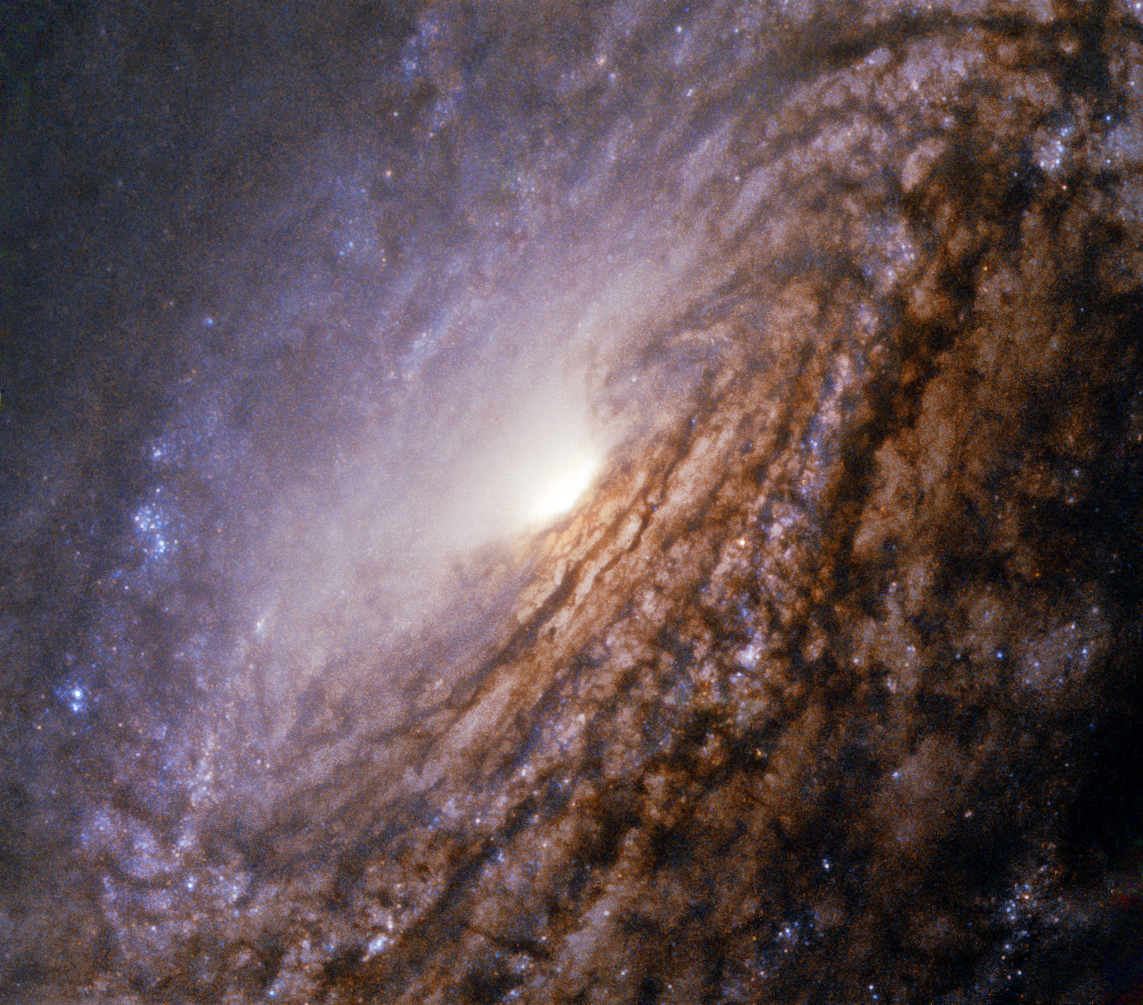
Detail of the galaxy by the Hubble Space Telescope. The bright core is believed to be an active supermassive black hole devouring stars, dust

NGC 5033 contains a Seyfert nucleus, a type of active galactic nucleus. Like many other active galactic nuclei, this galaxy's nucleus is thought to contain a supermassive black hole. The bright emission seen in visible light (as well as other wavebands) is partially produced by the hot gas in the environment around this black hole.

Integral field spectroscopic observations of the center of NGC 5033 indicate that the Seyfert nucleus is not located at the kinematic center of the galaxy (the point around which the stars in the galaxies rotate). This has been interpreted as evidence that this galaxy has undergone a merger. The displacement of the Seyfert nucleus from the kinematic center may destabilize the rotation of gas in the center of the galaxy, which could cause gas to fall into the Seyfert nucleus. The gas would be compressed by the enormous gravitational forces in the center of the Seyfert nucleus and become hot, thus making the nucleus appear bright or "active".

== Nearby galaxies ==
NGC 5033 and the nearby spiral galaxy NGC 5005 comprise a physical galaxy pair. The two galaxies weakly influence each other gravitationally, but they are not yet close enough to each other to be distorted by the tidal forces of the gravitational interaction. The fainter irregular galaxy IC 4182 is also a member of this group.

== See also ==
- List of NGC objects (5001-6000)
