= Yen Hai-Wen =

Chinese pilot (1916–1937)

- 閻海文
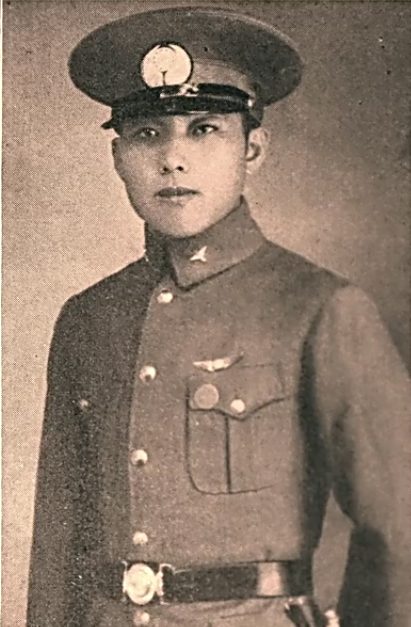
- Yan Haiwen, Second Lieutenant of the Air Force (1916-August 17, 1937)
- Born: 1916; Beizhen, Liaoning, China
- Died: August 17, 1937 (aged 20–21); Shanghai, China
- Military career
- Allegiance: Republic of China
- Branch: Republic of China Air Force
- Service years: 1934–1937
- Rank: Second Lieutenant
- Unit: 5th Squadron
- Conflicts: Second Sino-Japanese War

Yen Hai-Wen (Chinese: 閻海文; 1916–August 17, 1937) was a Chinese pilot in the Air Force of the Nationalist Government.

Yen Hai-Wen was born in Beizhen, Liaoning. He faced financial hardships, often having to interrupt his education. In the summer of 1934, he applied to both the Central Army Officers' School and the Central Aviation School, and was accepted to both. In pursuit of becoming an outstanding pilot, he chose the Central Aviation School.

After graduating from aviation school, Yen Hai-Wen served as a second lieutenant pilot in the 5th Squadron. Following the Marco Polo Bridge Incident, he was stationed in Yangzhou defending Nanjing's airspace.

On August 17, 1937, while conducting a bombing mission over the Japanese Army Command Headquarters in Shanghai, Yen Hai-Wen's plane, a Hawk III fighter-attack plane numbered 2510, was hit by Japanese anti-aircraft fire, causing it to catch fire. When he parachuted out, he landed in the vicinity of the Japanese positions due to wind deviations. He was surrounded and pursued by Japanese soldiers, and in the face of their attempts to convince him to surrender, Yen Hai-Wen shot at several Japanese soldiers, then shouted, "The Chinese Air Force never surrenders!", using his last bullet to kill himself. His bravery was recorded in Japanese media, and Japanese military personnel, respecting his courage and integrity, buried him with full military honors and erecting a monument called the "Chinese Air Force Hero's Grave". The Nationalist Government posthumously promoted him to the rank of Captain, and was re-buried in the Aviation Martyrs' Cemetery on the Purple Mountain in Nanjing.
