= 1937 Liechtenstein department stores referendum =

- 22 August 1937
- Referendum on banning department stores

Results
| Choice | Votes | % |
|---|---|---|
| Yes | 1,294 | 59.09% |
| No | 896 | 40.91% |
| Valid votes | 2,190 | 95.09% |
| Invalid or blank votes | 113 | 4.91% |
| Total votes | 2,303 | 100.00% |
| Registered voters/turnout | 2,545 | 90.49% |

A referendum on banning department stores was held in Liechtenstein on 22 August 1937. The proposal was approved by 59% of voters.

== Results ==
| Choice | Votes | % |
|---|---|---|
| For | 1,294 | 59.09 |
| Against | 896 | 40.91 |
| Total | 2,190 | 100.00 |
| Valid votes | 2,190 | 95.09 |
| Invalid/blank votes | 113 | 4.91 |
| Total votes | 2,303 | 100.00 |
| Registered voters/turnout | 2,545 | 90.49 |
Source: Nohlen & Stöver
