= IC 4182 =

Galaxy in the constellation Canes Venatici

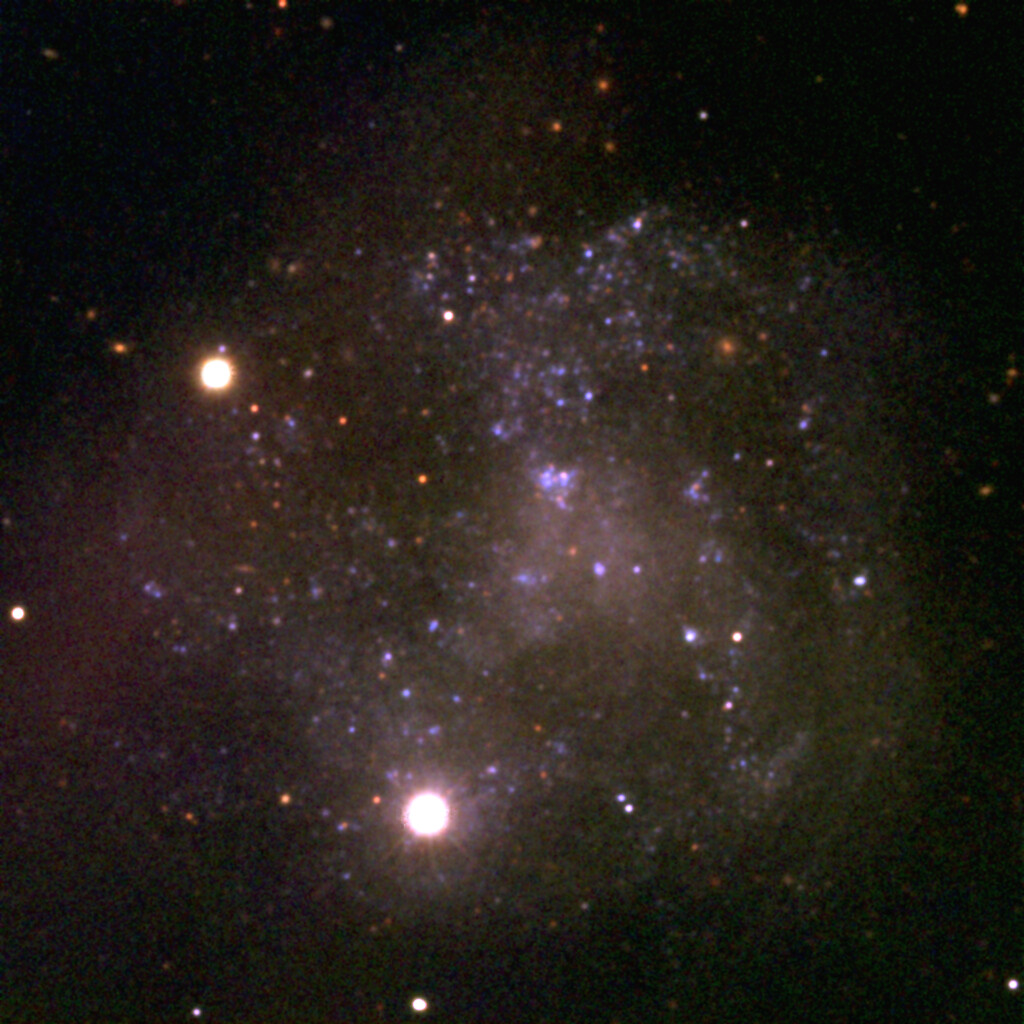
- IC 4182 imaged by Kitt Peak National Observatory

Observation data (J2000 epoch)
- Constellation: Canes Venatici
- Right ascension: 13^{h} 05^{m} 48.7008^{s}
- Declination: +37° 36′ 12.996″
- Redshift: 0.001071 ± 0.000003
- Heliocentric radial velocity: 321 ± 1 km/s
- Distance: 13.7 ± 2.6 Mly (4.2 ± 0.79 Mpc)
- Apparent magnitude (V): 11.4

Characteristics
- Type: SA(s)m
- Size: ~27,900 ly (8.55 kpc) (estimated)
- Apparent size (V): 6.0′ × 5.5′

Other designations
- IRAS F13035+3752, UGC 8188, MCG +06-29-031, PGC 45314, CGCG 189-020

IC 4182 is a Magellanic spiral galaxy in the constellation Canes Venatici. The galaxy lies about 14 million light years away from Earth, which means, given its apparent dimensions, that IC 4182 is approximately 28,000 light years across. It was discovered by German astronomer Max Wolf on 21 March 1903.

IC 4182 is seen nearly face-on. It has a low surface brightness disk with patch of star formation and no spiral pattern. The galaxy is close enough for its brightest stars to be resolvable through large telescopes, having a photometric blue filter apparent magnitude of 19.2, and a visual magnitude of around 20 for the brightest blue stars and around 21 for the brightest red stars. The density of ultraviolet sources decreases monotonically with radius.

The galaxy is considered to be a member of the M94 Group, while Garcia considered the galaxy to be a member of the LGG 334 group, along with NGC 5005 and NGC 5033.

== Supernova ==
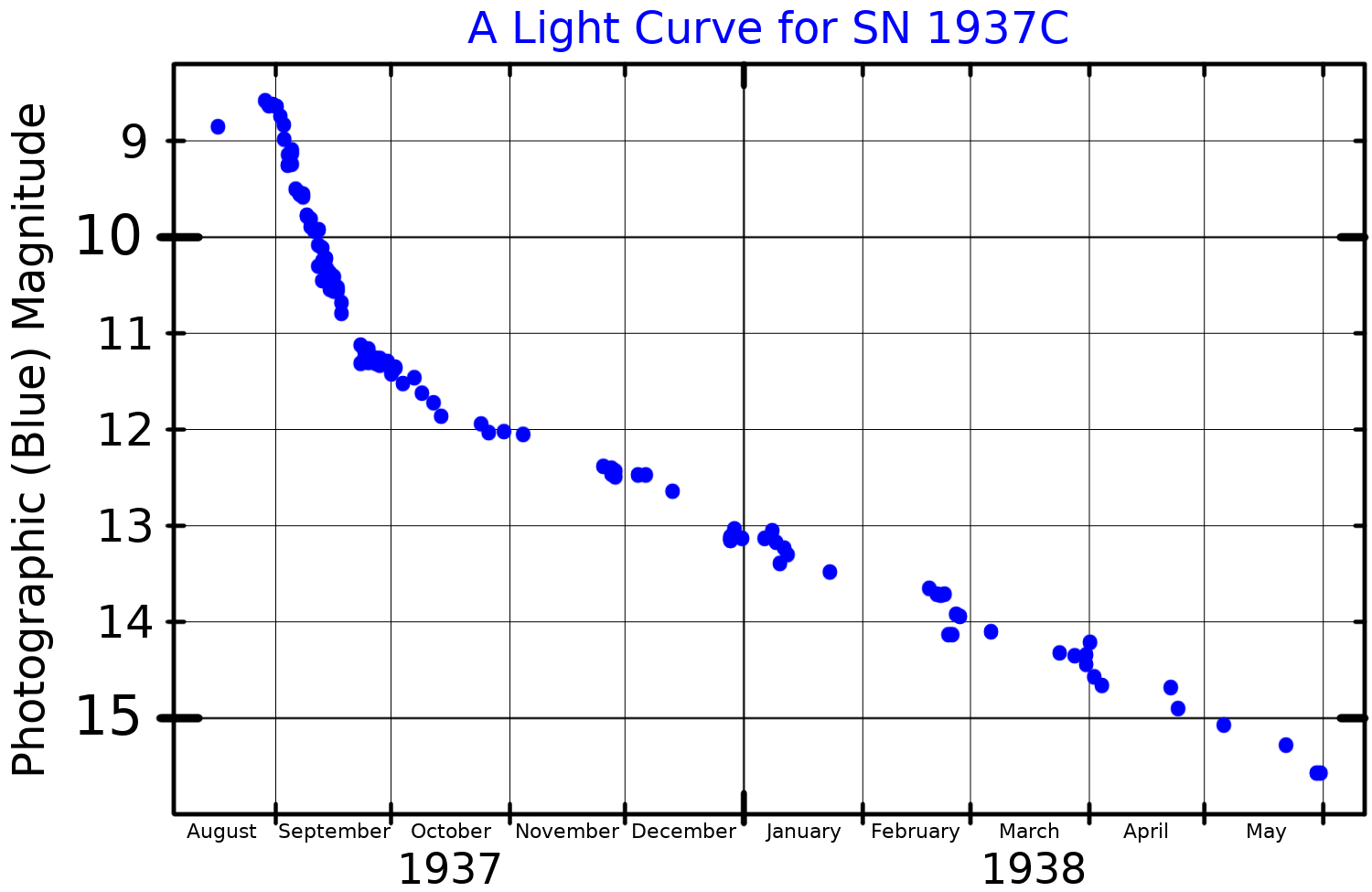
A light curve for SN 1937C, plotted from data published by Baade & Zwicky (1938)

One supernova has been observed in IC 4182: SN 1937C (Type Ia, mag. 8.4) was discovered by Fritz Zwicky on 24 August 1937. The supernova was located 30 arcseconds north and 40 arcseconds east of the nucleus, and was a few days post maximum. The peak apparent B-magnitude was estimated to have been 8.7.

The galaxy was observed repeatedly by the Hubble Space Telescope in 1992, leading to the discovery of Cepheid variable stars within it. SN 1937C then became the first Type Ia supernova to have its distance calibrated with Cepheid stars, and then used as standard candles to calculate the Hubble constant.
