= NGC 5002 =

Galaxy in the constellation of Canes Venatici

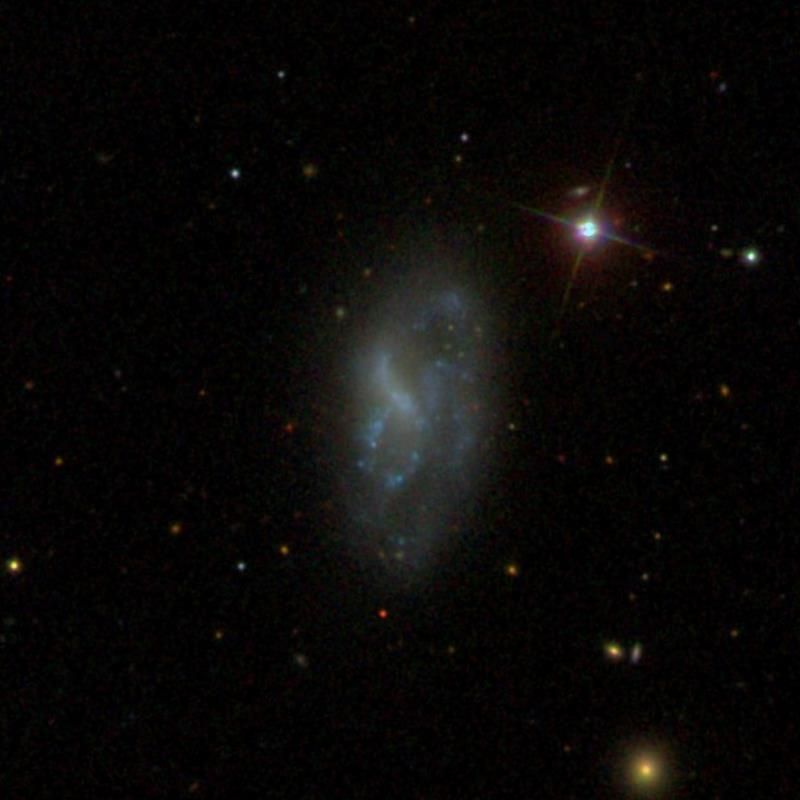
- SDSS image of NGC 5002

Observation data (J2000 epoch)
- Constellation: Canes Venatici
- Right ascension: 13^{h} 10^{m} 38.185^{s}
- Declination: +36° 38′ 03.19″
- Redshift: 0.003639
- Heliocentric radial velocity: 1091
- Distance: 39.8 Mly (12.20 Mpc)
- Apparent magnitude (B): 14.7

Characteristics
- Type: SBm
- Size: 19,700 ly (6,030 pc)
- Apparent size (V): 1.7′ × 1.0′

Other designations
- UGC 8254, MGC+06-29-051, PGC 45728

NGC 5002 is a Magellanic spiral galaxy in Canes Venatici. It was discovered by Heinrich d'Arrest in 1865. It is also known as MCG 6-29-51, PGC 45728, UGC 8254.

It has an apparent size of 1.7 by 1.0 arcmin.

== Supernova ==
One supernova has been observed in NGC 5002:

- SN 2020qxp (Type Ia, mag. 16.8), was discovered by ASAS-SN on 8 August 2020.
