= Henry Caldera =

Sri Lankan singer, songwriter and musician

- හෙන්රි කල්දේරා
- Born: 19 August 1937; Maradana, Sri Lanka
- Died: 11 October 2006 (aged 69); Seeduwa, Sri Lanka
- Resting place: Bandarawatte Cemetery
- Education: Seeduwa Deaf and Blind School
- Occupation: Singer
- Years active: 1968–2006
- Children: 4 Children
- Awards: Kala Bhushana, The Mother

Henry Caldera (Sinhala: හෙන්රි කල්දේරා) (19 August 1937 – 11 October 2006) was a Sri Lankan singer, songwriter, and musician.

== Early life and education ==
Caldera was born on 19 August 1937. Completely blind at the age of 14, he attended the Seeduwa Deaf and Blind School. There, Caldera studied under maestro Sunil Shantha, who conducted classes for blind students. After leaving school, Caldera continued to learn from Shantha at his house in Dehiyagatha, Ja-Ela.

== Career ==
Caldera became a radio artist in 1968 and recorded his first hit song Thara Petia in 1972. He subsequently released a four-song album in 1977. During his lifetime he released three audio cassettes and two compact discs. Most his songs were solos, and children's songs; it is said that Caldera often sang for his own children and grandchildren.

== Honours ==
In 1979, the Prime Minister of Sri Lanka, Ranasinghe Premadasa, donated a house for Caldera to live. In 1993, Caldera received a Kala Bhushana award (the second highest award granted by the state to performing artists). Student bodies at several universities and non-governmental organisations honored him in appreciation of his service to folk music.

== Personal life, and death ==
Caldera firmly believed that art is art and nothing could buy an artist; he held on to this belief until he died.

Caldera had four children with his wife, who was also blind. He was diagnosed with cancer in 2004 and died on 11 October 2006.

== Discography ==
Some of his top songs include:

- Abhisaru Landune
- Andannepa Amme
- Anna Duwe Handa Mama
- Budu Piye
- Deva Meniyane
- Dinindu Negi
- Eeye Udaye
- Etha Hime Ran Samanala Kanda Naginna
- Gayakayanani
- Hinaweyan Sudu Saman Male
- Hitha Ridunado Priye
- Kana Widina Wele
- Kanda Udin (Duet)
- Lanka Mage Lanka
- Mage Somi Sanda
- Mal Natu Weni
- Malli (Duet)
- Mawage Malagama
- Melowa Thibena
- Midule Sudu Weli Thalaye
- Mokada Nago (Duet)
- Mudu Sumudu Kumuda
- Nahawa Rasa Kiri Powa
- Ninda Soya
- Oba Pewa Hasarella
- Pemin Bandennai
- Penuna Suwa Dasun
- Sahayata Bhawa Saharawe
- Samanala Siripa
- Sanahase Sihil Nille (Duet)
- Sanda Aran Evilla
- Sihina Sandalle
- Sisila Sendaewe
- Sithu Wije Kala Wije
- Suhadiniye
- Thara Patiya
