= Curtiss BF2C Goshawk =

United States Naval Biplane

BF2C-1 Goshawk
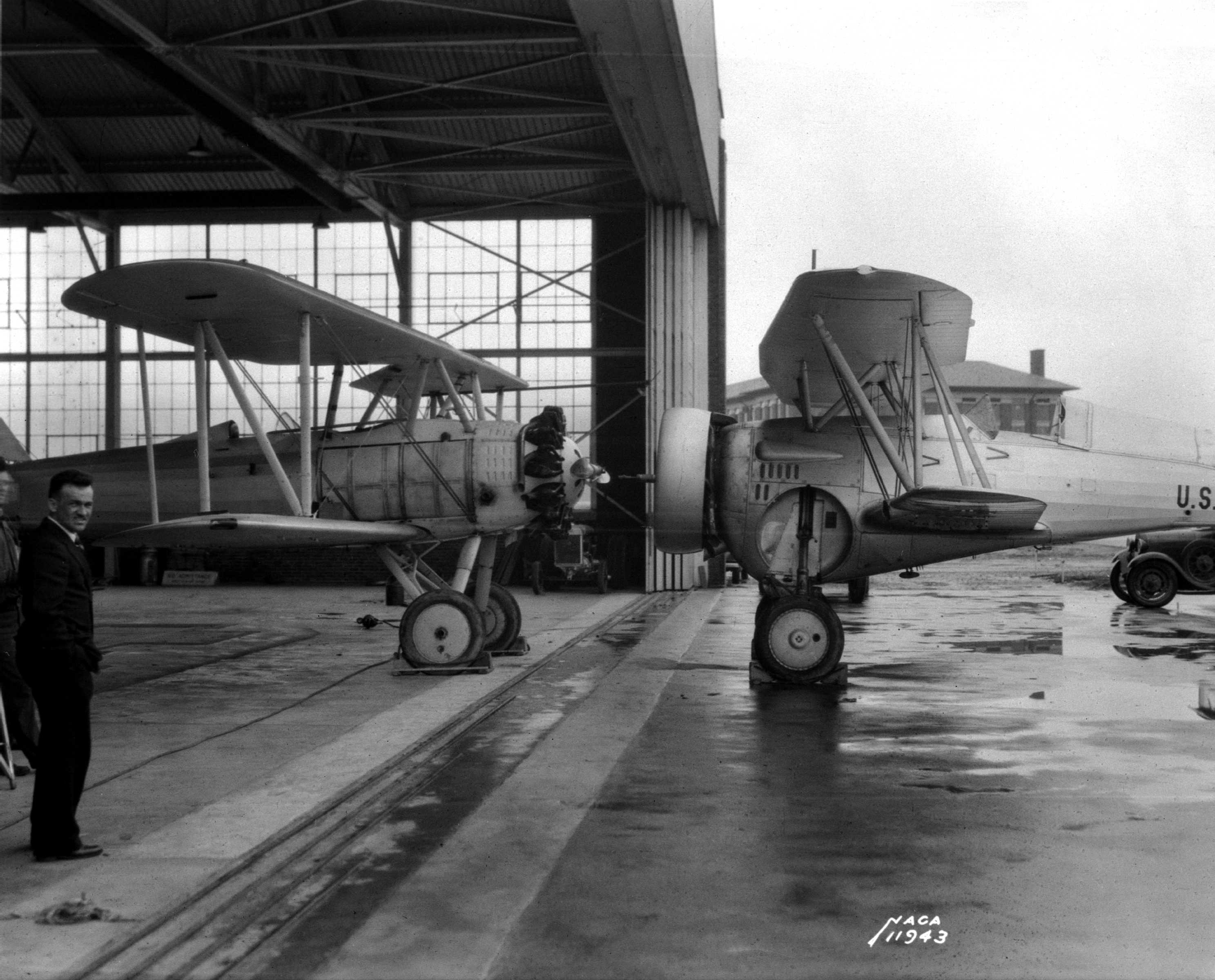
- Curtiss BF2C-1 - Model 67A (on the right)

General information
- Type: Carrierborne Fighter and fighter-bomber
- National origin: United States
- Manufacturer: Curtiss Aeroplane and Motor Company
- Primary users: United States Navy Republic of China; Royal Thai Air Force; Argentine Air Force
- Number built: 164 plus 2 prototypes

History
- Manufactured: October 1934
- Introduction date: 1933
- Retired: 1949
- Developed from: Curtiss F11C Goshawk

The Curtiss BF2C Goshawk (Model 67) was a United States 1930s naval biplane aircraft that saw limited success and was part of a long line of Hawk series airplanes made by the Curtiss Aeroplane and Motor Company for the American military, and for export as the Model 68 Hawk III.

== Design and development ==
The United States Navy and Curtiss felt that the F11C-2 possessed development potential, and the Navy decided to procure a variant with retractable landing gear. This variant, which still had the F11C-2's classic "Hawk" wood wing with its flat-bottomed Clark Y airfoil, was designated XF11C-3 by the Navy and Model 67 by Curtiss. The main gear retraction system was inspired by the Grover Loening-designed system on the Grumman XFF-1 prototype, and was manually operated.

The XF11C-3 was first delivered to the USN in May 1933, with a Wright R-1820-80 radial engine rated at 700 hp (520 kW). Trials revealed a 17 mph (27 km/h) increase in speed over the F11C-2, but the extra weight caused a decrease in maneuverability. The Navy felt the handling degradation was more than offset by the increase in speed, however. During testing the XF11C-3 had its wood-framed wing replaced by the metal-structured, biconvex, NACA 2212 airfoil wing, and soon after was redesignated XBF2C-1 (Model 67A) in keeping with the new Bomber-Fighter category.

== Operational history ==
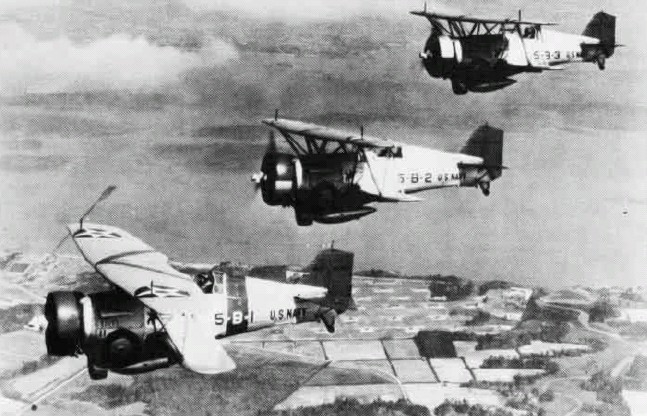
Three BF2C-1s of VB-5 from USS Ranger in 1934.

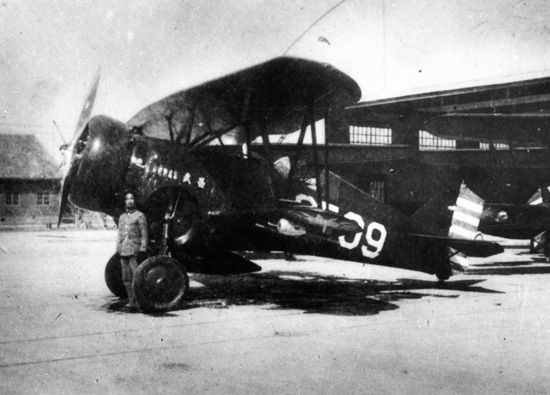
Chinese Hawk III, the primary fighter-attack of the Chinese Nationalist Air Force opposing the Japanese invasion in 1937, until superseded by Polikarpov I-15 and I-16 fighters

Twenty-seven BF2C-1 were ordered by the U.S. Navy, with a raised rear turtle deck, a semi-enclosed cockpit, and a metal-framed lower wing. It was armed with two .30 calibre Browning machine guns and three hardpoints for 500 lb (230 kg) of external stores. Delivered in October 1934, they were assigned to VB-5B on the aircraft carrier USS Ranger, but served only a few months before difficulties with the landing gear led to their withdrawal. In spite of its short service run, many of the innovations developed for the Goshawk line found wide use in Navy aircraft in the years that followed. They were the last Curtiss fighter accepted for service with the U.S. Navy.

The export version Model 68 Hawk III reverted to the classic wood/Clark Y wings and was powered by a 770 hp (570 kW) R-1820-F53. Chinese Hawk IIIs (about 100 licensed-built in the CAMCO plant at Jianqiao Aerodrome) served as multi-purpose aircraft when combat operations against the Imperial Japanese Army and Navy Air Forces began in earnest in August 1937, particularly with the Battle of Shanghai and Nanjing, and were considered the Nationalist Chinese Air Force's frontline fighter-pursuit aircraft along with their inventory of Hawk IIs, Boeing Model 281 "Peashooters" and Fiat CR.32s. Col. Gao Zhihang scored a double-kill against the superior Mitsubishi A5M "Claude" (predecessor of the A6M "Zero") over Nanjing on 12 October, 1937 while at the controls of his Hawk III numbered "IV-I" (4th Pursuit Group, Commander). The appearance of monoplanes like the A5M shifted the balance towards the Japanese. Several Chinese pilots achieved fighter-ace status while flying solely the Hawk IIIs, including Capt. Liu Cuigang, Lt. Lu Jichun, Capt. Yuan Baokang, Lt. Yue Yiqin.

A Chinese Hawk III pilot Lt. Yan Haiwen flying in aircraft # 2510 (25th PS plane # 10), was shot down by anti-aircraft fire while attacking Japanese positions in Shanghai on 17 August, 1937, parachuted into enemy-held territory, exchanging gunfire with soldiers ordered to capture him alive; saving the last bullet for himself, and famously buried with full military honors by the Imperial Japanese Army. As the air-interdiction and close-air support for the National Revolutionary Army of China continued at the Battle of Shanghai on 14 October, 1937, the Chinese Air Force launched a major strike against Japanese positions in Shanghai at 16:00 hours with a uniquely mixed force of three Curtiss Hawk IIIs escorting three B-10s, two He 111As, five O-2MCs and five Gammas from Nanjing in the late-afternoon, and then one strike launched every hour from Nanking to Shanghai in the evening until 03:00 hours on 15 October. These combination of attacks with the Hawk IIIs were used against both the Imperial Japanese Army and Navy Air Forces, and against both ground and naval targets with considerable success through the end of 1937, before being superseded by the better-armed and faster Polikarpov I-15 and I-16 fighters that were supplied to the Chinese Air Force through the Sino-Soviet Treaty of 1937.

In early 1935, Thailand placed an order for 24 Curtiss Hawk IIIs at a cost of 63,900 Baht each, and a manufacturing license was also bought. The first 12 Hawk IIIs were shipped to Thailand in August and the remaining 12 arrived in late 1935, which were named Fighter Type 10. A total of 50 Hawk IIIs were locally built during 1937 and 1939. The type was used against the French in the Franco-Thai War and the Japanese invaders in December 1941, then relegated for use as trainers. Some of these aircraft were still active in 1949 and one airframe (KH-10) survives in the Royal Thai Air Force Museum.

The Model 79 Hawk IV demonstrator had a fully enclosed cockpit and a 790 hp (590 kW) R-1820-F56.

== Variants ==
XBF2C-1 Hawk
The XF11C-3 prototype redesignated as a fighter-bomber.
BF2C-1 Goshawk (Model 67A)
Production version of the XF11C-3; 27 built.
Hawk III (Model 68)
Export version of BF2C-1 with an 770 hp (570 kW) R-1820-F53 for Argentina, China, Thailand and Turkey; 137 built.
Hawk IV (Model 79)
Export version with an 790 hp (590 kW) R-1820-F56 engine; one demonstrator built.
B.Kh.10
(Thai: บ.ข.๑๐) Royal Siamese Air Force designation for the Hawk III.

== Operators ==
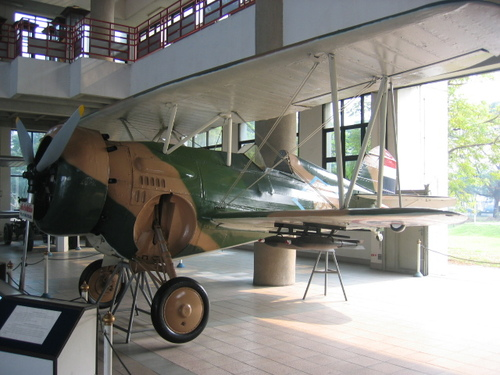
Curtiss BF2C Goshawk at the Royal Thai Air Force Museum

Argentina

- Army Aviation Service operated ten Model 68A Hawk III and 1 Model 79 Hawk IV.

(Taiwan) China

- Chinese Nationalist Air Force operated 102 Model 68C Hawk III

Thailand

- Royal Thai Air Force operated 24 Model 68B Hawk III and Produced domestically in the amount of 50 units

Turkey

- Turkish Air Force operated one Model 68B Hawk III

United States

- United States Navy operated 27 BF2C-1s

== Specifications (Hawk III) ==
Data from Curtiss Aircraft 1907–1947, The complete encyclopedia of world aircraft

General characteristics

- Crew: 1
- Length: 24 ft 4 in (7.42 m)
- Wingspan: 31 ft 6 in (9.60 m)
- Height: 9 ft 11.5 in (3.035 m)
- Wing area: 262 sq ft (24.3 m^{2})
- Airfoil: root: NACA 2212; tip: NACA 2212
- Empty weight: 3,326 lb (1,509 kg)
- Gross weight: 4,552 lb (2,065 kg)
- Powerplant: 1 × Wright R-1820-04 Cyclone 9-cylinder air-cooled radial piston engine, 770 hp (570 kW)
- Propellers: 3-bladed propeller

Performance

- Maximum speed: 255 mph (410 km/h, 222 kn)
- Cruise speed: 157 mph (253 km/h, 136 kn)
- Range: 725 mi (1,167 km, 630 nmi)
- Service ceiling: 27,000 ft (8,200 m)
- Rate of climb: 1,950 ft/min (9.9 m/s)

Armament

- 1 x 0.30 in (7.62 mm) M1919 Browning machine gun (Right) + 1 x 0.50 in (12.7 mm) M2 Browning machine gun (Left)
- 1 x 474 lb (215 kg) bomb on an under-fuselage hardpoint or 2 x 117 lb (53 kg) bombs carried, one under each lower wing
