= NGC 4861 =

Irregular galaxy in constellation Canes Venatici

- Hubble Space Telescope image of NGC 4861, taken using the Advanced Camera for Surveys

Observation data (J2000 epoch)
- Constellation: Canes Venatici
- Right ascension: 12^{h} 59^{m} 02.340^{s}
- Declination: +34° 51′ 33.98″
- Redshift: 0.002785
- Heliocentric radial velocity: 835
- Distance: 34.77 ± 15.99 Mly (10.662 ± 4.903 Mpc)
- Group or cluster: Virgo Cluster
- Apparent magnitude (V): 12.32
- Apparent magnitude (B): 12.90

Characteristics
- Type: SB(s)m; Im/BCD
- Apparent size (V): 0.797′ × 0.692′

Other designations
- Arp 266, UGC 8098, MCG+06-29-003, PGC 44536

NGC 4861, also known as Arp 266, is a galaxy in the constellation Canes Venatici. It was discovered by William Herschel on May 1, 1785.

Morphological classification of NGC 4861 has proved relatively difficult. Its mass, size, and rotational velocity are consistent with it being a spiral galaxy. However, due to its highly irregular shape, it may also be classified as a dwarf irregular galaxy. In fact, since dwarf galaxies are less massive and have lower gravitational potentials, gases and other material for star formation can move within them much faster, causing the galaxy to become a specific type of starburst galaxy, called a blue compact dwarf galaxy. It has also been described as a "comet-like" galaxy due to its resemblance to a comet.

Two ultraluminous X-ray sources (ULXs) have been found within NGC 4861. The first, NGC 4861 X1, is associated with a dense H II region. The second, NGC 4861 X2, seems to be within a small star cluster near the "comet head" of NGC 4861. Assuming it is a star cluster, it has a mass of 400±80 M_{☉} and an age of 5 million years. Compared to other star clusters with which ULXs are associated, its mass is quite low.

== See also ==
- Dwarf irregular galaxy
