= Valsadornín Hoard =

Roman Coin Hoard found in Spain

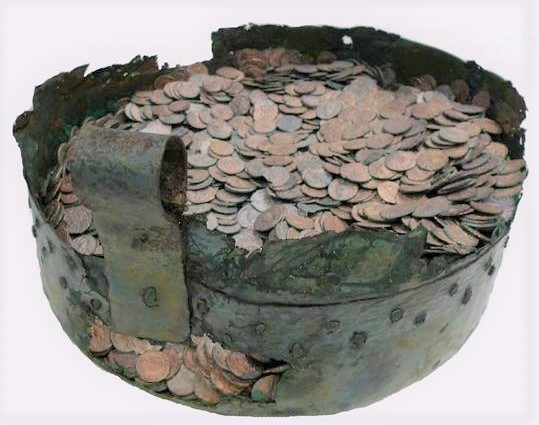
- Material: Silver and copper
- Weight: 50 kg
- Period/culture: c. 270
- Discovered: 1937
- Culture: Roman Hispania

The Valsadornín Hoard is a coin hoard from the Roman Hispania period (dated circa 270) found near the town of Valsadornín, in the province of Palencia in Spain.

The artifact is a 28 kg kitchen cauldron with a conical bottom, made of thin metal sheets joined by rivets. It originally had two copper-handled rivets, one remaining. Inside were approximately 11,000 antoniniani coins, identifiable by emperors with radiate crowns and empresses with crescent moons.

== Discovery and excavation ==
=== Discovery ===
The treasure was discovered on August 19, 1937, by siblings Tomás and Eusebia Roldán while walking along the path that connected Valsadornín with Gramedo, the village where they lived. During a heavy storm, as they were crossing the area of Santa Águeda at a spot known as Valdiquecho, they stumbled upon the remains of a container protruding from the ground, containing a large number of coins. The siblings collected the treasure and brought it home. There, they confirmed it was a kind of pot filled with a cluster of oxidized coins. The entire set weighed 45 kilograms.

=== Excavation ===
The archaeological authorities of Palencia inspected the site in search of other possible remains but found none. The treasure was moved to the Museum of Palencia, though not in its entirety, as some coins were kept by the Roldán siblings themselves, as well as by residents of Cervera de Pisuerga, the governor of Valladolid, Juan Alonso-Villalobos Solórzano, and the Archaeology Department of the University of Valladolid. The treasure remained in the Museum of Palencia until 1951, when the amalgamated portion was transferred to the National Archaeological Museum (MAN) in Madrid.

In 1979, the first study of the portion that remained in Palencia was conducted. Among the coins in the treasure, the Roman emperors most commonly represented are Gallienus, Claudius Gothicus, and Salonina, although a total of eighteen rulers are represented. The total number of coins in Palencia was 2,421, weighing 6.2 kg, which accounted for 14% of the initial find. The examination of the coins allows the hiding date of the treasure to be fixed no earlier than 270, and its owner likely buried it due to the internal instability of the time. It is estimated that the treasure initially contained around ten thousand pieces.

=== Conservation ===
The portion in Madrid remained in storage at the National Archaeological Museum (Museo Arqueológico Nacional or MAN) for decades, awaiting restoration. In 2016, due to its state of preservation, it was submitted to the Spanish Cultural Heritage Institute (IPCE) for study and restoration. The cauldron was in very poor condition and deformed due to its thinness (0.26 mm), with numerous folded, sunken, warped, cracked, and fragmented areas, as well as ochre-colored clay deposits. The material losses revealed the accumulation and arrangement of the coins inside.

The coins, completely compacted, had the same dense, thick, and covering clay-like deposit on the entire surface and in the depressions of the relief, with a high degree of surface alteration. Copper corrosion was also evident, appearing as a complex alternation of layers of malachite and cuprite, interspersed with silver sulfides and lead carbonate (cerussite) deposits. Most of them had remnants of other coins adhered to their surface, which, when violently removed, broke and left overlapping fragments, or conversely, took part of the underlying coin. In this state, the readability of the complete reliefs was difficult, confusing, or practically impossible.

Due to the peculiarities of the set, it was deemed unsuitable to subject the object to any aqueous treatment that might induce the development of salts or moisten the clays enclosed within the object. Therefore, after conducting various cleaning tests, the use of a micro-abrasive device with glass microbeads was chosen. This method achieved uniform and relatively quick cleaning while removing the thick, deforming deposits. This system also allowed access to coins in the background and edges. The same system was used for the loose coins.

Once the container was also cleaned, the few copper chlorides it presented were vaporized, and a final finish was applied using a laser. Subsequently, the loose fragments accompanying the set were reassembled. Due to its low structural stability, some edges of the container were reintegrated, and the cracks were also filled. The treatment concluded with the application of several protective layers.

After being displayed at the MAN museum, the hoard was handed over to the Museum of Palencia in January 2019 for its full exhibition.

== Bibliography ==
- Calleja González, María Valentina (1979). "El tesoro romano de Valsadornín" (PDF). Publicaciones de la Institución Tello Téllez de Meneses (in Spanish). 42: 5–25. ISSN 0210-7317.
- García Alonso, Emma (2018). "Estudio, conservación y restauración del Tesoro de Valsadornín (Museo de Palencia)" (PDF). Informes y Trabajos (in Spanish). 16. Secretaría General Técnica. Centro de Publicaciones. Ministerio de Cultura y Deporte: 122–131.
- Cepeda Ocampo, J. J. (2002). "Tesoros monetarios de la segunda mitad del siglo III. Valsadornín, 1937. Porto Carro, 1974". Actas del X Congreso Nacional de Numismática (Albacete, 1998) (in Spanish). Madrid. pp. 411–423.
- Martínez Mira, Isidro (2004–2005). "Tesorillos del s. III d. C. en la Península Ibérica (III)". Lucentum (in Spanish). XXIII–XXIV: 207–236. ISSN 0213-2338.
- Mateu y Llopis, F. (1952). "Hallazgos monetarios (VII) (1). De nuevo sobre el valor documental de las colecciones". Numario Hispánico (in Spanish). I: 225–264.
- Navarro García, Rafael (1939). Catálogo Monumental de la provincia de Palencia. Fascículo Tercero. Partidos de Cervera de Río Pisuerga y Saldaña (in Spanish). Palencia: Imprenta Provincial.
