= Cervera de Pisuerga =

Coordinates: 42°52′N 4°30′W

- municipality
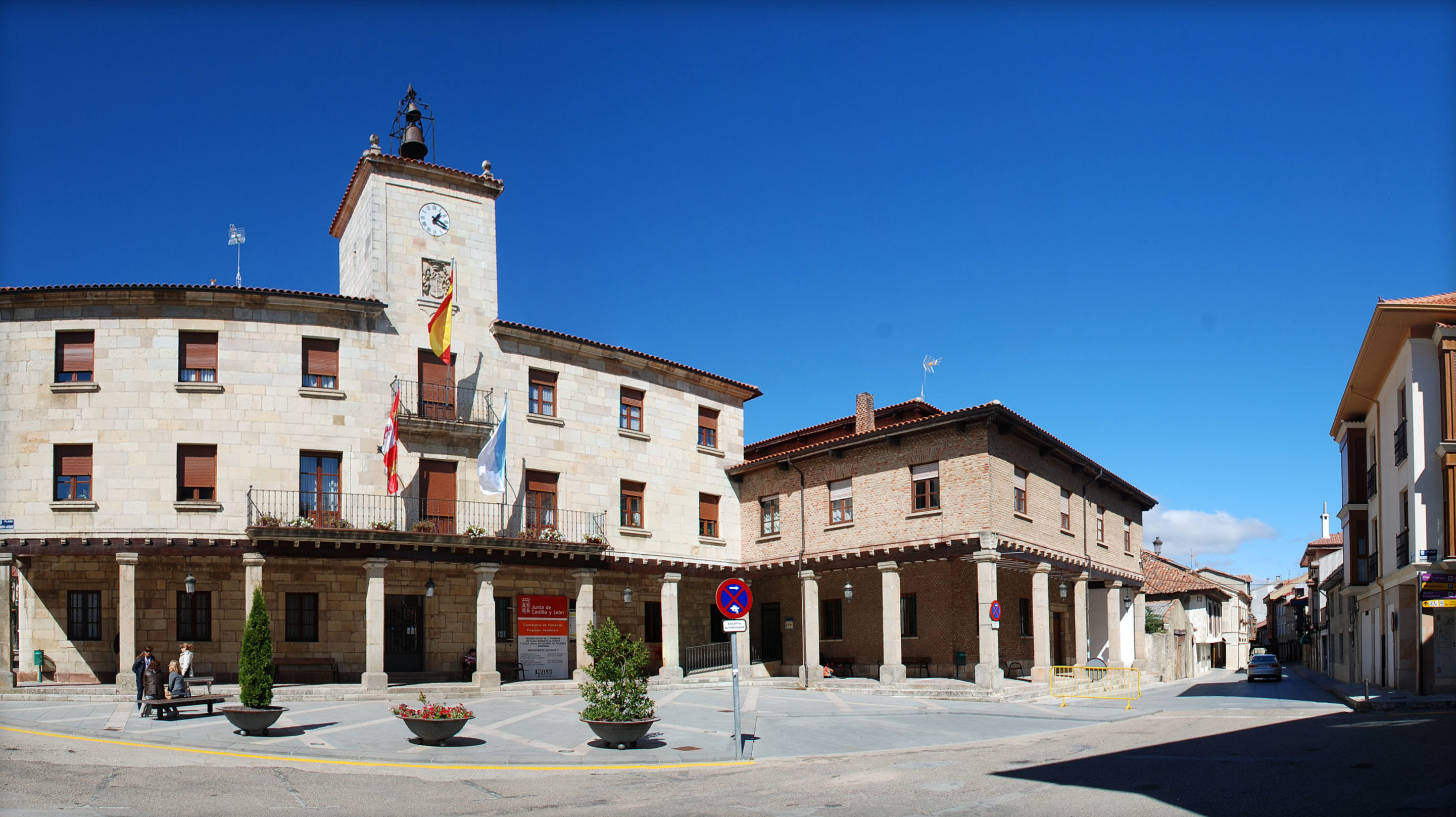

- Coat of arms
- Interactive map of Cervera de Pisuerga
- Country: Spain
- Autonomous community: Castile and León
- Province: Palencia
- Municipality: Cervera de Pisuerga

Area
  - Total: 323 km^{2} (125 sq mi)

Population (2025-01-01)
  - Total: 2,272
  - Density: 7.03/km^{2} (18.2/sq mi)
- Time zone: UTC+1 (CET)
  - Summer (DST): UTC+2 (CEST)
- Website: Official website

Cervera de Pisuerga is a municipality located on the banks of the Pisuerga River in the province of Palencia, Castile and León, Spain. According to the 2018 census (INE), the municipality had a population of 2,316 inhabitants.

In one of the nearby villages of Cervera de Pisuerga, Valsadornín, the Roman Valsadornín Hoard was discovered in 1937.

== Gallery ==
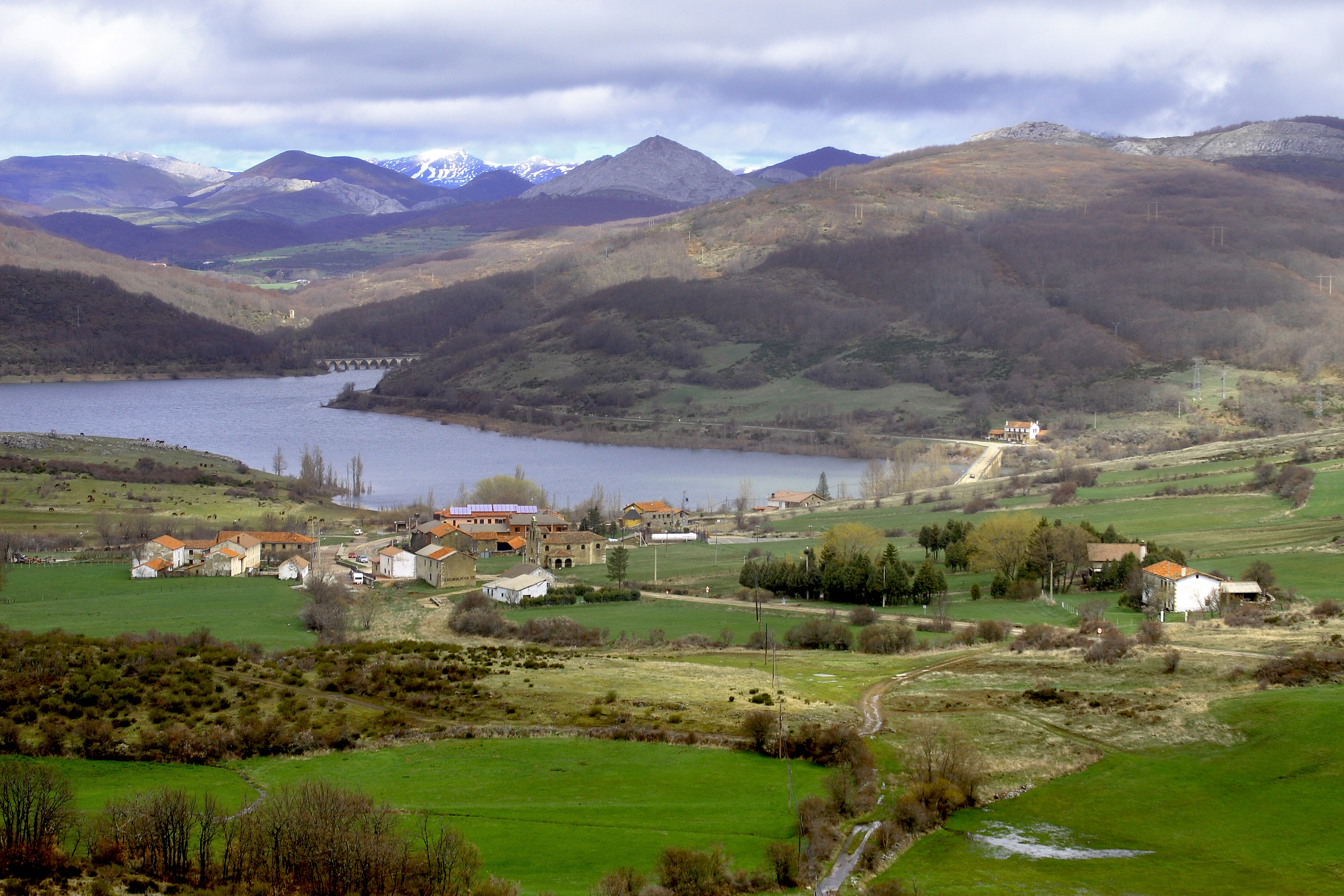
View of Vañes town, in Cervera de Pisuerga.

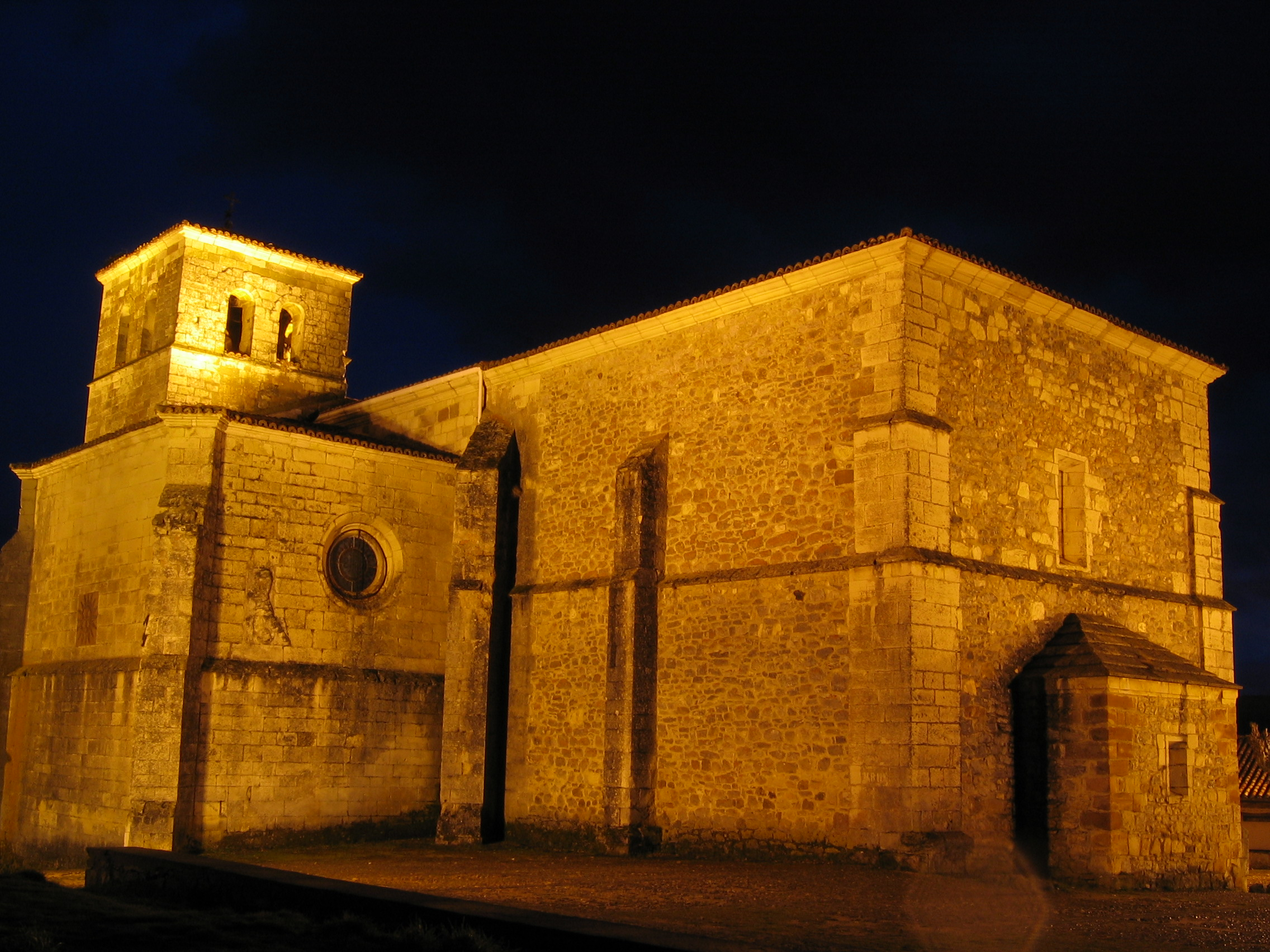
The old Santa María del Castillo Church, in Cervera de Pisuerga.

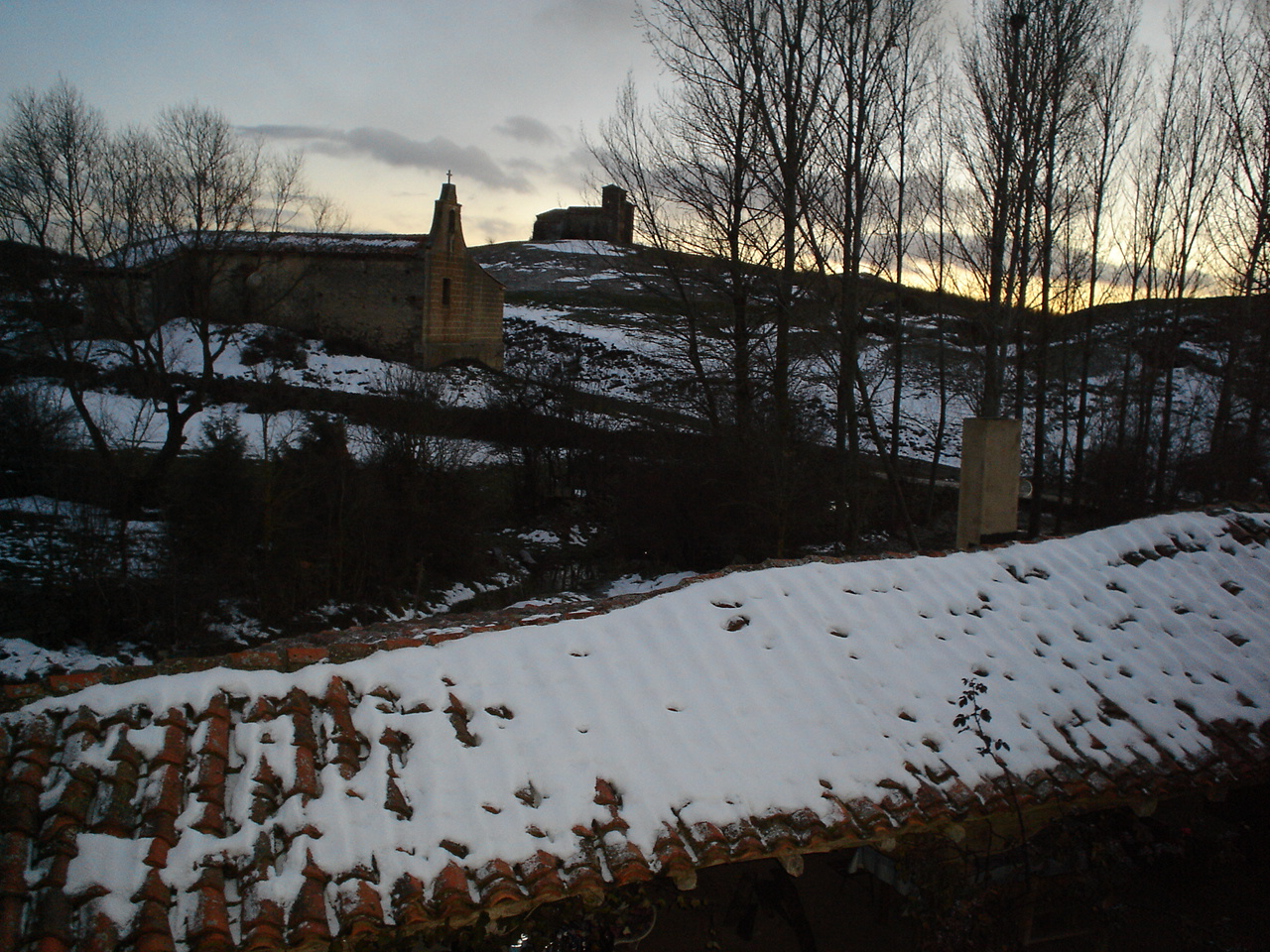
View of Rabanal de los Caballeros town, in Cervera de Pisuerga.

== See also ==
- Verdeña
