= NGC 5005 =

Galaxy in the constellation Canes Venatici

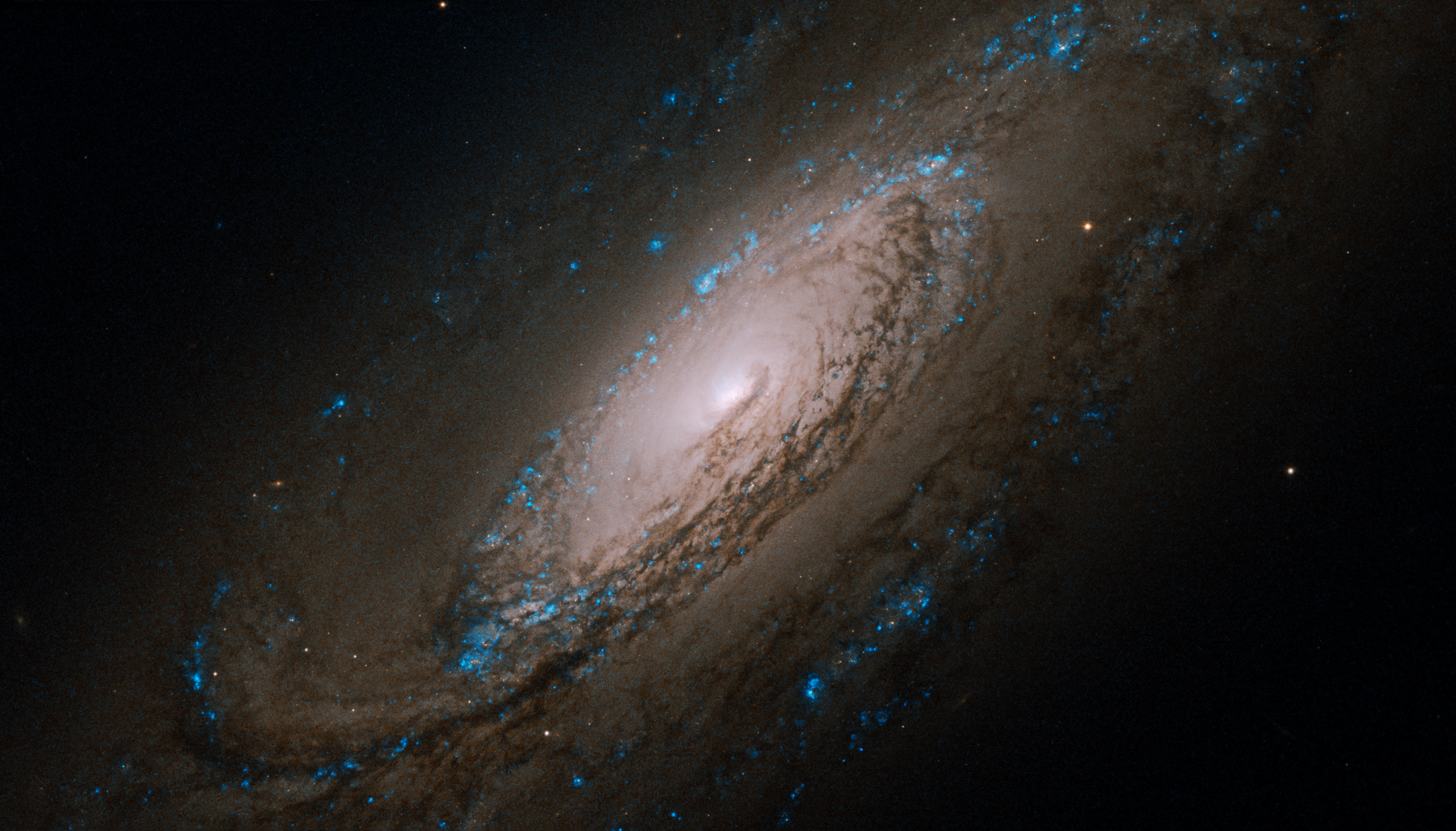
- NGC 5005 imaged by the Hubble Space Telescope

Observation data (J2000 epoch)
- Constellation: Canes Venatici
- Right ascension: 13^{h} 10^{m} 56.2648^{s}
- Declination: +37° 03′ 32.559″
- Redshift: 0.003156 ± 0.000017
- Heliocentric radial velocity: 946 ± 5 km/s
- Distance: 65.48 ± 3.70 Mly (20.075 ± 1.133 Mpc)
- Apparent magnitude (V): 10.6

Characteristics
- Type: SAB(rs)bc
- Size: ~125,400 ly (38.46 kpc) (estimated)
- Apparent size (V): 5.8′ × 2.8′

Other designations
- IRAS 13086+3719, UGC 8256, MCG +06-29-052, PGC 45749, CGCG 189-035, C 29

NGC 5005, also known as Caldwell 29, is an inclined spiral galaxy in the constellation Canes Venatici. It was discovered by German-British astronomer William Herschel on 1 May 1785. The galaxy has a relatively bright nucleus and a bright disk that contains multiple dust lanes. The galaxy's high surface brightness makes it an object that is visible to amateur astronomers using large amateur telescopes.

Distance measurements for NGC 5005 vary from 13.7 megaparsecs (45 million light-years) to 34.6 megaparsecs (113 million light-years), averaging about 20 megaparsecs (65 million light-years).

== Supernova ==
One supernova has been observed in NGC 5005: SN 1996ai (Type Ia, mag. 14.5) was discovered by Claudio Bottari on 16 June 1996.

== Nucleus ==
NGC 5005 contains a low ionization nuclear emission region (LINER) nucleus. LINER nuclei contain weakly ionized gas. The power source for the LINER emission has been debated extensively, with some researchers suggesting that LINERs are powered by active galactic nuclei that contain supermassive black holes and other researchers suggesting that LINERs are powered by star formation activity.

=== X-ray emission ===
X-ray observations of NGC 5005 have revealed that it contains a variable, point-like hard X-ray source in its nucleus. These results imply that NGC 5005 contains a supermassive black hole. The strong, variable X-ray emission is characteristic of the emission expected from the hot, compressed gas in the environment outside a black hole in an active galactic nucleus.

== Companion galaxy ==
NGC 5005 and the nearby spiral galaxy NGC 5033 comprise a physical galaxy pair. The two galaxies weakly influence each other gravitationally, but they are not yet close enough to each other to be distorted by the tidal forces of the gravitational interaction.

== See also ==
- List of NGC objects (5001–6000)
