= Palencia mining basin =

Coal mining area in Palencia, Spain

Palencia mining basin

Map of the province of Palencia, with the municipalities considered mining towns in dark color:
1- Velilla del Río Carrión, 2- Guardo, 3- Santibáñez de la Peña, 4- Castrejón de la Peña, 5- Dehesa de Montejo, 6- Cervera de Pisuerga, 7- La Pernía, 8- San Cebrián de Mudá, 9- Mudá, 10- Barruelo de Santullán.

Location of the province of Palencia on the map of Spain.

The Palencia mining basin is a Spanish coal mining area located on the southern slope of the Cantabrian mountain range. It owes its name to its location, in the north of the province of Palencia, in the region of Montaña Palentina. Its main exploitations are black coal and anthracite.

Palencia's Carboniferous outcrops are located in the so-called Pisuerga-Carrión Unit, a metamorphic area that constitutes the easternmost part of the geological regions of the Cantabrian Area. They extend for about 55 km in a SW-NE direction in the north of the province.

The discovery of coal in this area took place in 1838 between the towns of Orbó and Barruelo, in the eastern part of the basin, so they were the first areas to begin its exploitation. Coal mining completely changed the economy and demography of the region, becoming its main economic means and facilitating the installation of infrastructures for its transport, such as La Robla railway and the Barruelo–Quintanilla de las Torres railway branch.

It was the country's main source of energy during the autarky of the 1950s, but from the 1960s onwards it began a period of recession when it was replaced by other hydrocarbons, and received its final blow with Spain's entry into the European Economic Community in 1986, which led to the closure of all unprofitable installations. During the nineties, all mining operations were gradually closed, until they were reduced to two underground mines in Velilla del Río Carrión and two open-pit mines in the municipalities of Guardo and Castrejón de la Peña. In 2012 UMINSA announced the indefinite closure of all its mines in the province, which was carried out throughout 2014.

The influence of almost two centuries of mining activity has been very important in aspects such as the natural landscape, demography, economy, sociology and culture of the area.

== Geographical context ==
=== Topography ===
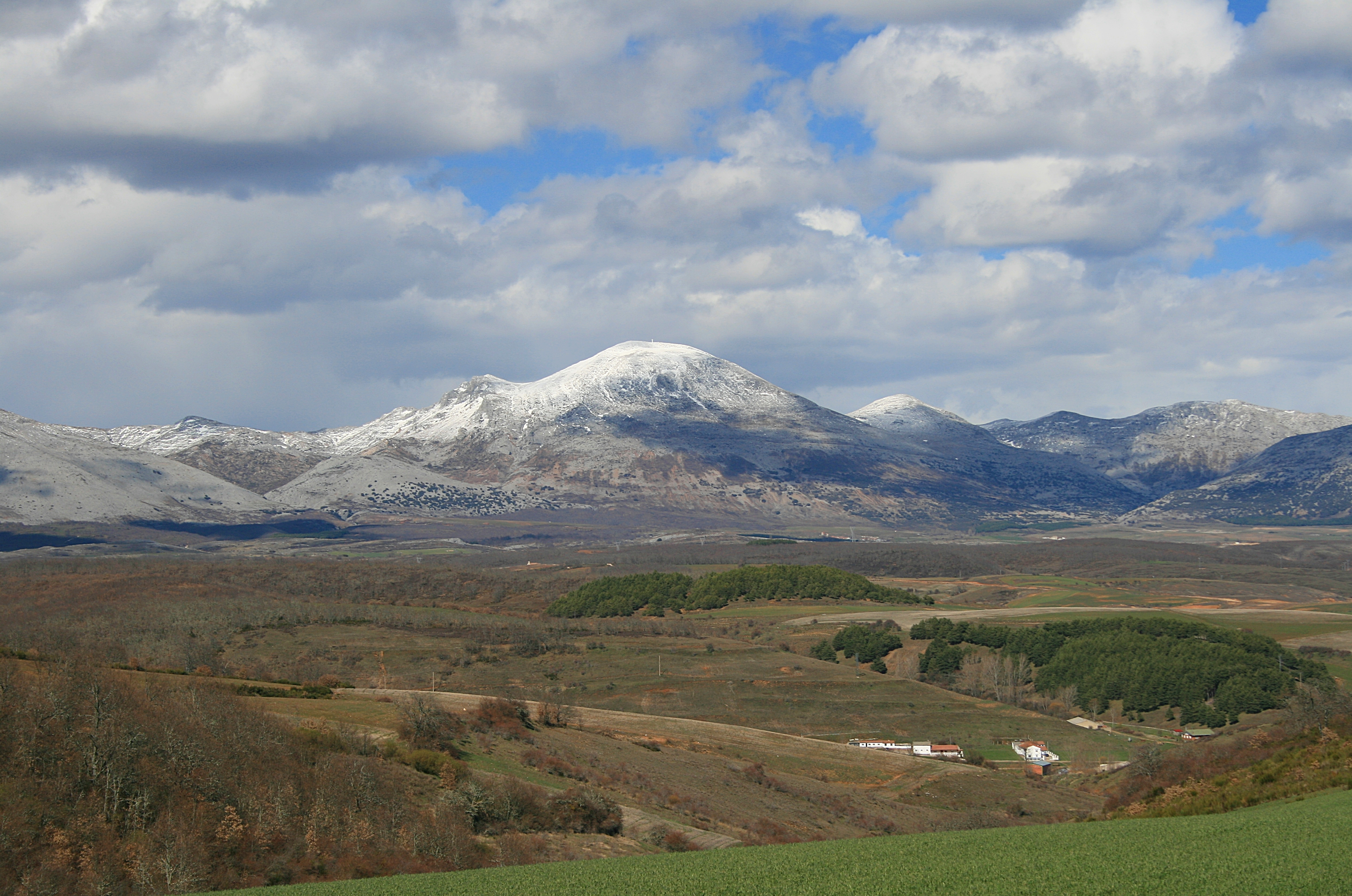
Southern view of La Peña (foothills of the Sierra del Brezo) from Respenda de la Peña, with Peña Redonda in the center. At its feet can be seen the towns of Las Heras and Santibáñez de la Peña. The southern slope of this mountain range was populated by mining operations throughout the 20th century.

Montaña Palentina is a natural region characterized by the mountainous landscape that gives it its name. It is located in the central sector of the Cantabrian Mountain Range, and its relief is characterized by a strong contrast between the river valleys and the mountainous elevations. The Ministry of Agriculture grants the region the status of High Mountain Area, according to Law 25/1982. Within it are distinguished, from west to east, three mountainous areas:

- Fuentes Carrionas and La Pernía Occidental, in the westernmost part of the area, next to the provincial borders with Cantabria and León, where the highest elevations of the region are located: Curavacas (2520 masl), Espigüete (2450 m) and Pico Murcia (2431 m). (Note: Peña Prieta (2538 m) has been excluded because its summit is in Cantabria.)
- Sierra del Brezo and La Peña, extending some 30 km from Fuentes Carrionas to the Pisuerga basin, with Peña del Fraile (2025 m) and Peña Redonda (1993 m) as the highest peaks.ƒ
- Sierra Braña, Sierra de Peña Labra and Sierra de Híjar, in the easternmost part of the region, next to the provincial border with Cantabria. Its most representative peaks are Valdecebollas (2139 m), Peña Sestil (2063 m) and Peña Labra (2029 m).

In Montaña Palentina there are two important sedimentary basins, the Douro basin, with the source in the area of two important affluents: the Carrión and the Pisuerga; and the Ebro basin, which crosses a small portion to the NE of the region.

=== Geographic subdivision ===
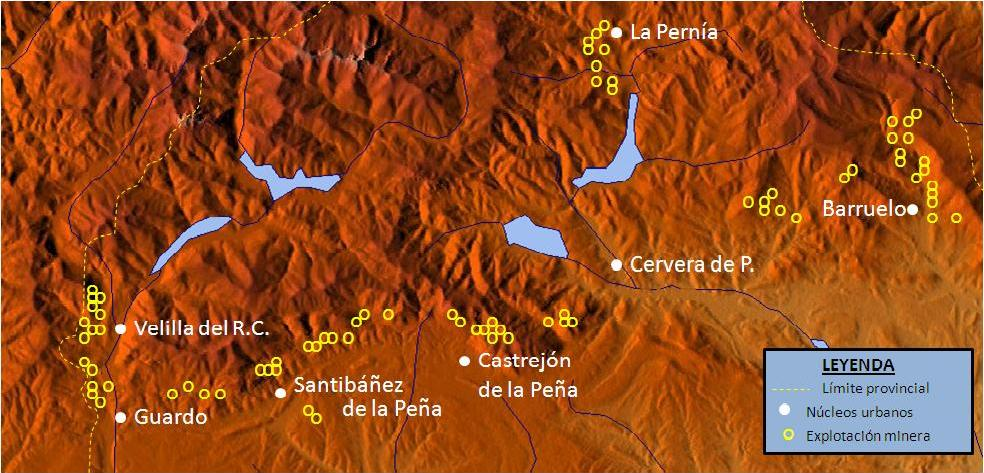
Physical map of the northern part of the province of Palencia, showing the distribution of the main subway mining operations, of which in 2010 only two remained in operation, both in Velilla del Río Carrión, in the western part.

Ricardo Becerro de Bengoa, one of the first historians to document the basin, established in 1874 in his Libro de Palencia the first geographical subdivision of the Palencia mining area:

- Rubagón basin: the area around the Rubagón river, with Barruelo de Santullán and Orbó as main centers.
- Carrión basin: in the vicinity of the Carrión river, with the farms of Guardo, Velilla del Río Carrión and Santibáñez de la Peña as centers.
- Pisuerga basin: mining operations north of Cervera de Pisuerga, mainly La Pernía and San Salvador de Cantamuda.

This subdivision carried out in the 19th century has continued to be considered valid by modern authors.

=== Subdivision by rank ===
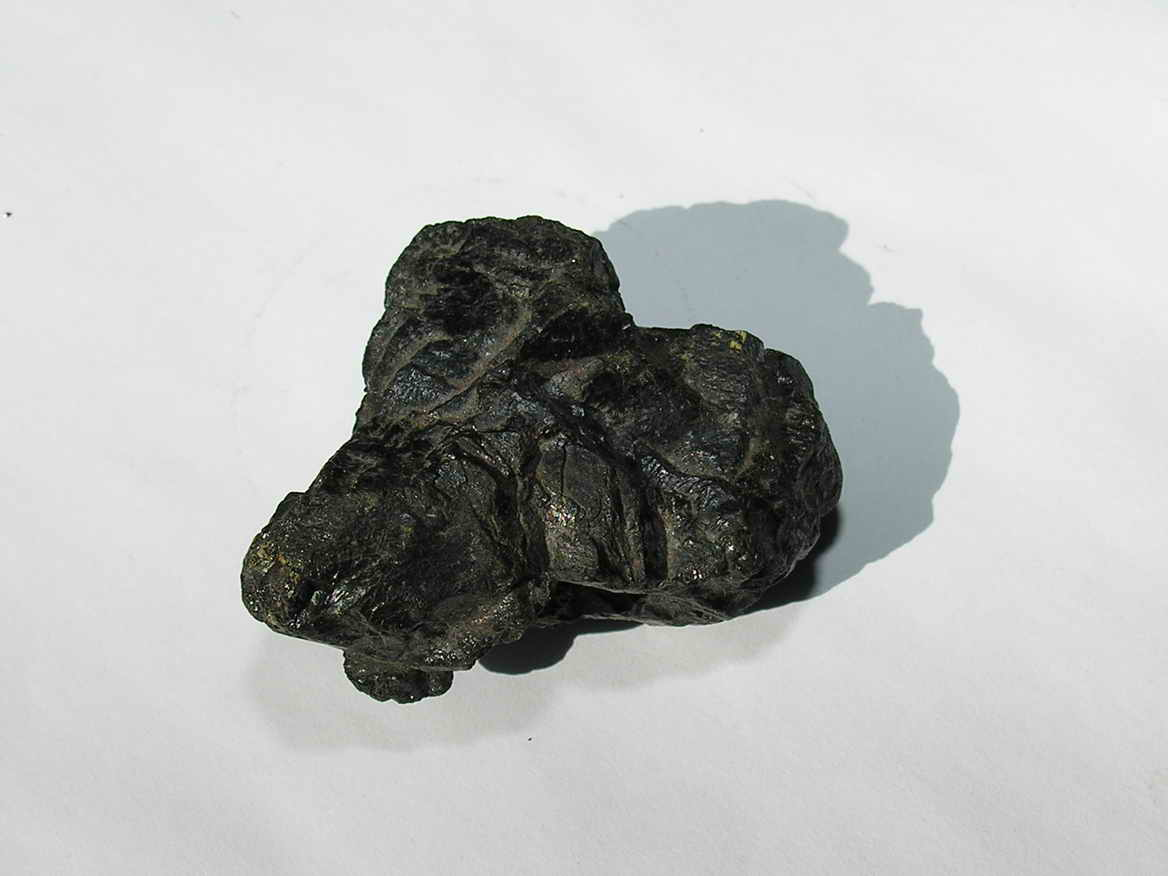
Fragment of black coal ore, which is distributed in the northeastern part of the Montaña Palentina.

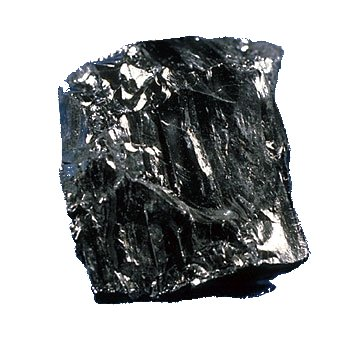
Anthracite is located in the NW part of the basin.

==== Black Coal ====
Black coal is mainly found around the Santullán valley, with the main center being the town of Barruelo. It was the geologist Casiano de Prado who was the first to study the León and Palencia coal basins. According to a study published in 1875 by Román Oriol y Vidal, the coal layers were mainly found in Valle, Orbó, Barruelo and San Cebrián de Mudá, although they also extended as far as Guardo in the western part and towards Verdeña, San Salvador de Cantamuda, Lores and Piedrasluengas in the north. According to this study, there are 16 layers of coal in the valley divided into three groups: the lower group, comprising the four oldest layers of the formation, which were already being exploited at the time; the middle group, made up of eight layers, also being exploited; and the upper group, composed of three layers of good condition and a fourth of poor quality. From the lower to the middle group it was estimated a distance of 100 m, and from this one to the upper one a distance of about 500 m, being the thickness of each layer of approximately one meter. Its reserves are estimated at 75 million tons, plus another probable 50 million tons.

==== Anthracite ====
The anthracite basin is located in the northwest of the province, from the border with the province of León to Cervera de Pisuerga. It is a narrow strip bounded to the north by the mountainous elevations of Fuentes Carrionas and Sierra del Brezo and to the south by the towns of Velilla del Río Carrión, Guardo, Santibáñez de la Peña, Castrejón de la Peña and Dehesa de Montejo. Further north, there is another center around La Pernía and San Salvador de Cantamuda.

This area is estimated to consist of ten to twelve anthracite layers of varying quality, approximately one meter thick. Reserves are estimated to be about 85 million tons certain plus another probable 20 million tons.

== Geology ==
=== General geology ===
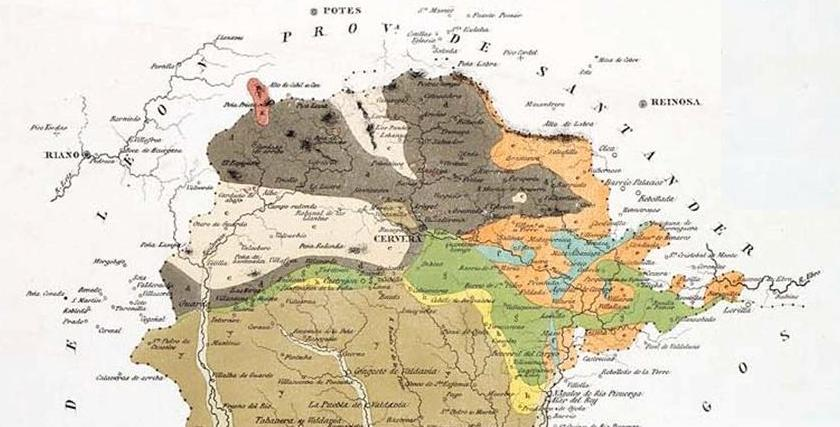
Detail of the geological map of the province of Palencia made by Casiano de Prado in 1856. Note that the areas corresponding to the mining basin correspond to the Carboniferous period (dark brown on the map).

The Palencia mining basin is located on the so-called Pisuerga-Carrión Unit, which is the easternmost part of the geological regions of the Cantabrian Area.

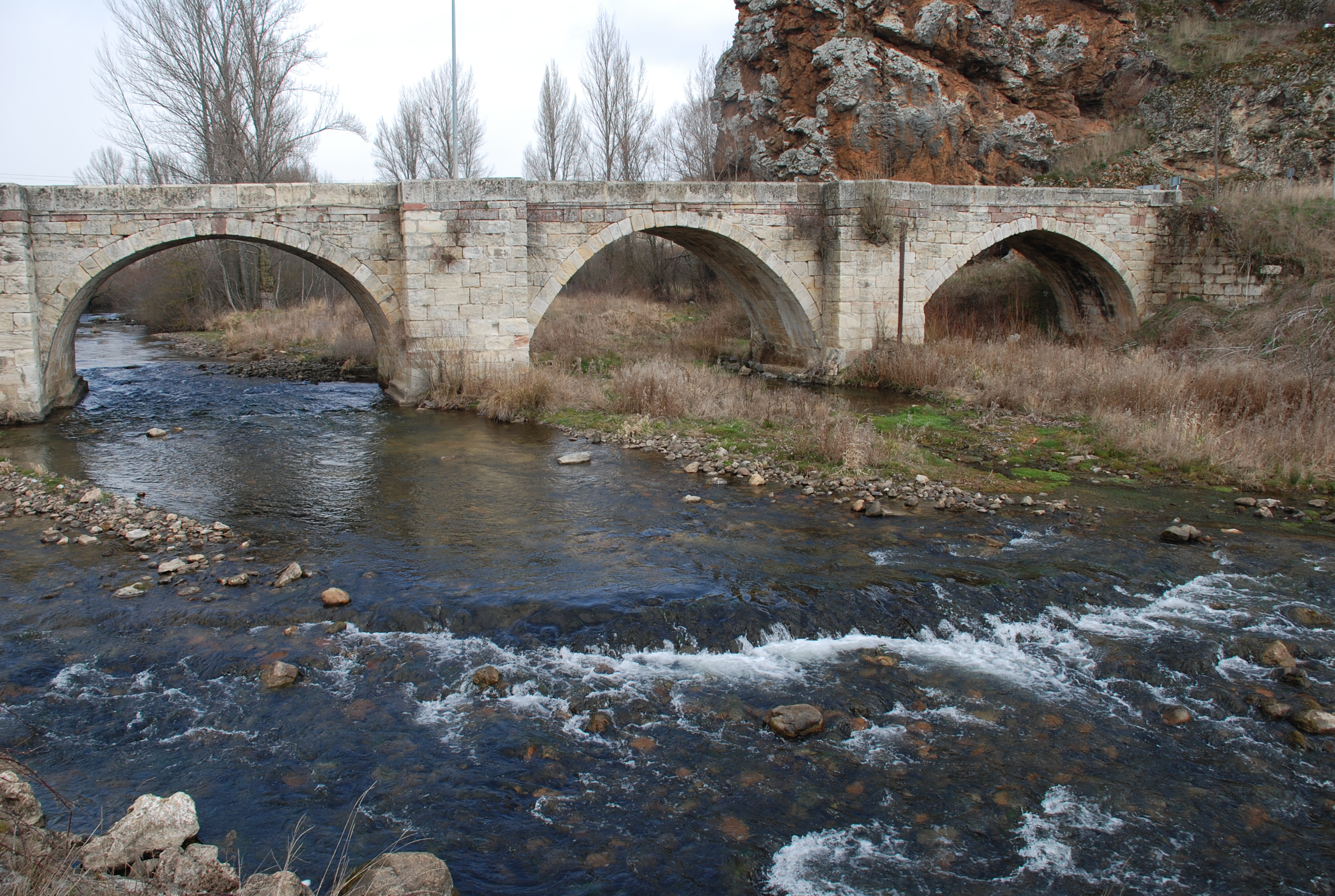
The bridge over the Pisuerga river in Cervera. The Pisuerga is usually considered, unofficially, the boundary between the Guardo-Cervera subarea of anthracite production and the Barruelo subarea and its black coal exploitations. For its part, the town of Cervera was for much of the 20th century the nerve center of a mining area that included the nearby exploitations of Dehesa de Montejo to the south and La Pernía to the north, reaching its population peak in 1991, with 2,953 inhabitants.

It is composed of Paleozoic materials on which the Quaternary deposits of the northern end of the Douro basin are based. The Carboniferous system, which extends for about 55 km in a SW-NE direction through the north of the province of Palencia, is characterized by the presence of series of sediments with important facies variations. The outcrops of the Lower Carboniferous are very homogeneous and are linked to the Devonian, so they are considered pre-orogenic, while from the Namurian onwards their composition is much more complex and varies depending on the area, having differentiated at least five areas with different stratigraphic characteristics.

The carboniferous sediments of the Palencia basin belong to four sequential periods marked by successive tectonic phases: Westphalian, Stephanian and Lower Pre-Permian. Although both basins (coal and anthracite) were intensely folded during the Asturian phase of the Westphalian A, their origin, as shown below, is different.

=== Geology by area ===
==== Black coal basin ====
The black coal basin dates to the Westphalian B phase of the Carboniferous period. Sedimentation in this basin was mainly deltaic, composed mainly of marine phases between which continental episodes were interspersed with coal beds. Filling took place during two stages: Westphalian B basal deposits and Westphalian C shales, peats and limestones.

In this subarea of Barruelo, of mainly marine sedimentation, the thickness of the sedimentary succession is about 8000 m. Six lithostratigraphic units with coal layers have been distinguished, with the following yield:

- Peña Cildá Formation: >500 m
- Barruelo Formation: 1200 m
- Brañosera Formation: 870 m
- Ojosa Formation: >2200 m
- Vergaño Formation: 1350 m

==== Anthracite basin ====
The Guardo-Cervera subarea belongs to the Westphalian D period. Unlike the Barruelo subarea (predominantly marine), this basin is of continental influence. Its sedimentary series rests on the remains of the Devonian and Lower Carboniferous, and is composed of mainly continental sections alternating with marine ones.

The carboniferous belt that extends from Guardo to Cervera de Pisuerga is originated by the alpine movement that gave rise to the Sierra del Brezo, which dragged a carboniferous formation from the interior of the plateau to fold over the Cantabrian mountain range, forming a fault where the carboniferous deposits are located.

== Petrography ==
According to a study published in the specialized journal Geogaceta in 2006, coals from the Guardo-La Pernía area reach the anthracite grade depending on their volatile matter content. It also indicates that the high rank reached by the coals in this area, as well as the presence of natural coke and pyrocarbons in them, implies their exposure to high temperatures and an important thermal alteration. As a conclusion, it is pointed out that the tectonics of the area has had an important influence on the range and the physical-structural characteristics of its coals.

The coal from the Santullán valley and Rubagón basin is classified as black coal, and belongs to the so-called Northern Coal Formation, which also includes the deposits of Asturias and León, with which it shares characteristics. Hard coal is an organic sedimentary rock, a type of coal formed by the compression of lignite.

== Mining activity ==
=== History ===
==== Context ====
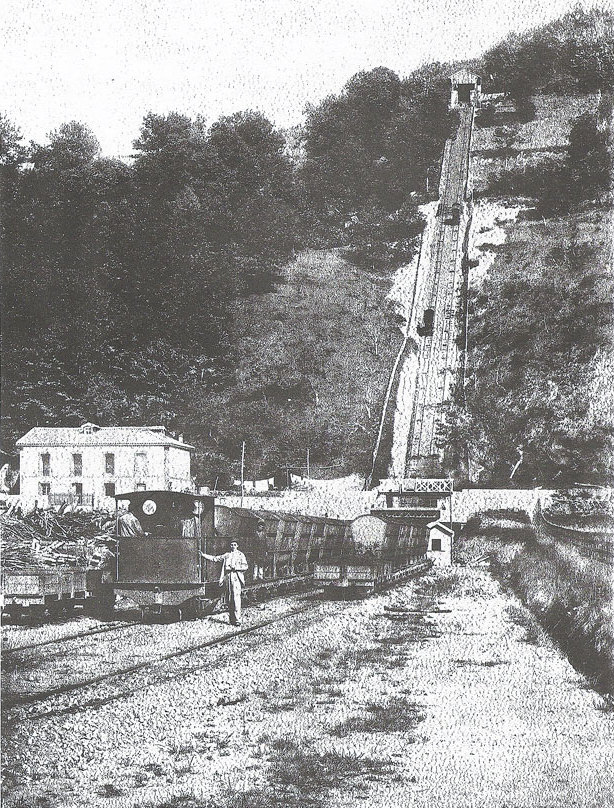
Asturian mining was a pioneer in coal mining in Spain, and has also been subject to a severe recession since the late 20th century. In the picture, inclined plane at the "Mariana" mine in Mieres, c. 1895.

Two facts conditioned the beginning of mining activity in the northern part of the province of Palencia: the need for coal for the new technology that arose after the Industrial Revolution and the new mining legislation enacted in Spain at the time.

The appearance of the steam engine, the driving force of the industrial revolution that began in the second half of the 18th century, increased the world's consumption of fossil fuels, especially coal. Its application to the railroad, the means of transportation that revolutionized this era, led to the mine, the factory and the railroad as the generating agents.

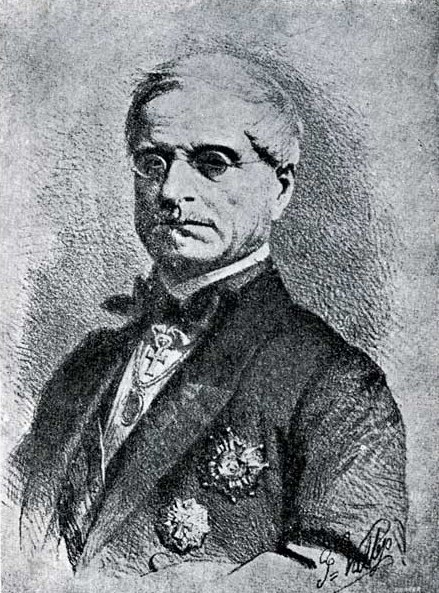
Casiano de Prado

In Spain, the need to liberalize the mining sector and favor private initiative allowed successive modifications in the legislation, and the reform carried out by Fausto de Elhuyar in 1825 under the reign of Ferdinand VII was followed by the definitive Mining Law of 1868, which allowed the definitive transfer of the ownership of the mines, previously owned by the Crown, to the hands of private investors.

The beginning of coal mining in Spain was in Asturias, where the mining engineer Guillermo Schulz carried out between 1832 and 1834 a precise geological study that allowed the exact location of the black coal deposits. At the end of the 1830s, the first mining companies were born in the area, which would give rise to other more powerful ones, such as Duro Felguera.

==== First prospections ====
- Black coal basin

The versatile Ricardo Becerro de Bengoa attributes in his writings the discovery of coal in the Montaña Palentina to the parish priest of Salcedillo, Ciriaco del Río, in 1838. According to Becerro de Bengoa, the priest (who a few days before had read an article in a newspaper about coal and its exploitation) was returning one afternoon from Aguilar de Campoo when, between the towns of Orbó and Barruelo, he found some pieces of black stone on his way. After verifying that the mineral burned and kept the heat, he ascertained the presence of greater quantities, contacting the mining company Collantes of Reinosa to begin the exploitation of the deposit. This thesis is maintained by the existing historiography on the subject.

The first company to carry out an industrial exploitation of the mines was the Collantes Hermanos Company, constituted for that purpose, and which acquired several concessions in the area in 1846. In 1856, this company sold its holdings to the Crédito Mobiliario Español, which would carry out the extraction and distribution of the mineral. At that time, it was transported in animal-drawn carts to Alar del Rey, from where it was transported in barges through the Canal de Castilla to Valladolid, from where it was distributed. This system made the final price of the product considerably more expensive, so the construction of the Barruelo-Quintanilla de las Torres railway branch was undertaken, which linked with the Palencia-Santander railroad and was put into operation in December 1863. Thanks to this infrastructure, Barruelan black coal began to compete with that produced in other areas, multiplying its production, which reached 53,740 tons in 1865, and would make the province the second in Spain in terms of coal production. Between 1901 and 1910, the Rubagon basin produced 1,200,150 tons.

- Anthracite basin

The beginning of anthracite mining in the Palencia basin was later than that of black coal, and it was not fully developed until the construction of La Robla railway. Thus, its activity cannot be considered productive until 1895, with extractions carried out by the Bilbao company Sociedad Euskaro-Castellana in the area of Guardo. In 1900, mining was activated in Villaverde de la Peña, La Pernía and Castrejón de la Peña, the latter initiated by Claudio López Bru, Marquis of Comillas, who acquired the main mines in the municipality.

From 1908 onwards, the activity in Guardo was taken over by the Sociedad Minera San Luis, which acquired the Euskaro-Castellana mines and in a short time became the main company in the area. The other great center of the Palencia anthracite, Velilla del Río Carrión, would not experience its definitive hatching until a few years later, although the presence of several layers in its vicinity had already been confirmed.

- La Robla railway

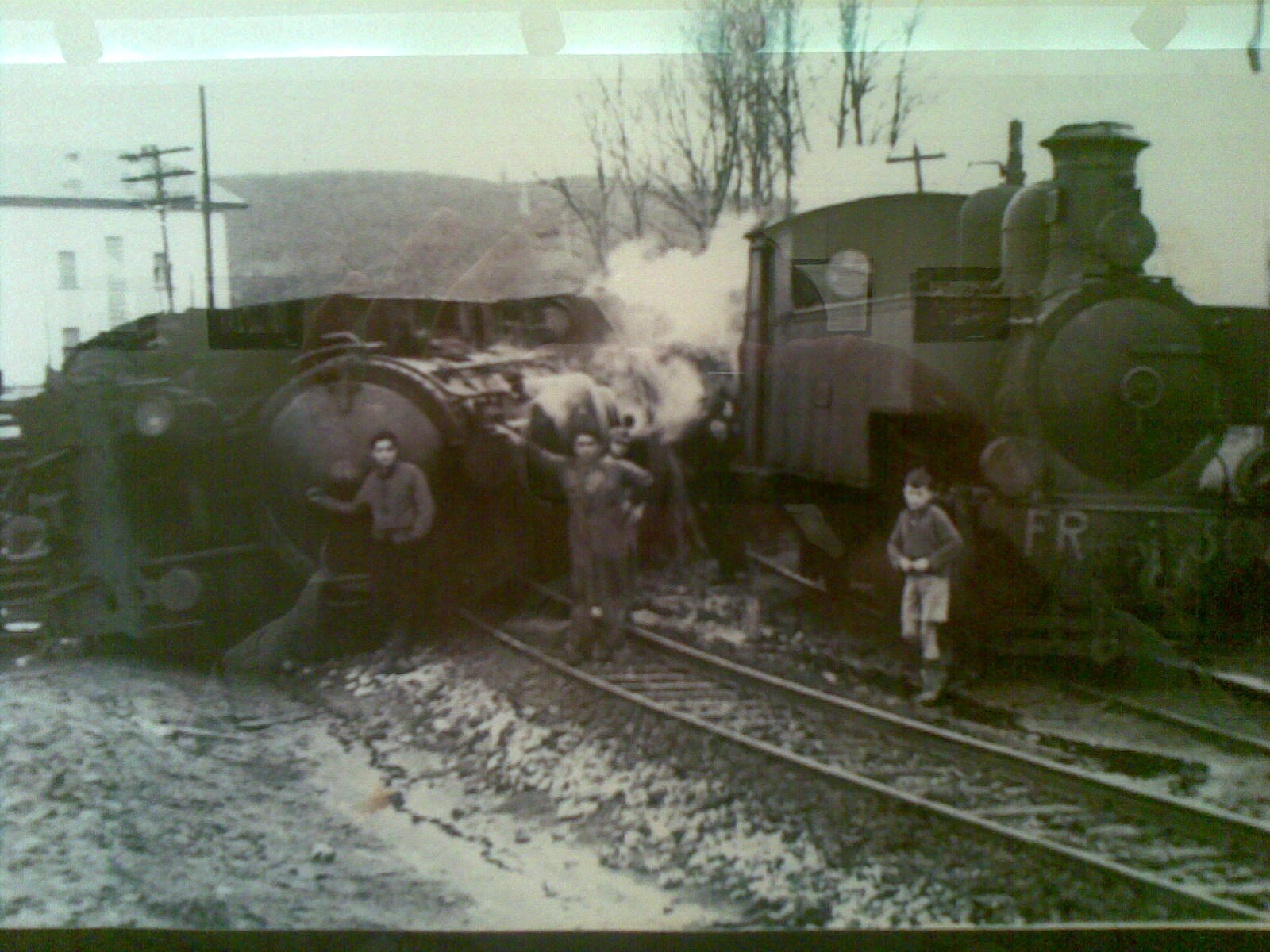
A locomotive of La Robla railway derailed in the vicinity of the Guardo station, in an image from the 1940s. The construction of this narrow-gauge railway line opened up a distribution possibility for coal from Palencia that had a decisive influence on the sector.

The construction of La Robla railway meant the definitive backing for the development of mining in the province of Palencia. Its project was due to the great importance acquired by the metallurgical industry in Biscay at the end of the 19th century (since 1902, Altos Hornos de Vizcaya), and its important repercussion in the Spanish industrial development. The main problem of this industry was the high cost of transporting the coal needed to produce the coke used to feed the blast furnaces. This fuel reached the Biscayan ports by sea, coming from Asturias and England. This fact caused that the porcentual importance of the fuel in the production cost of the iron ingot in Biscay doubled and even tripled what it represented in other iron and steel areas such as Pittsburgh, Loire or Westphalia. The need arose for an efficient means of transport to link the isolated Palencia and Leon basins with the emerging Basque steel mills. The chosen one was the railroad, which after the Industrial Revolution had become the most advantageous land transport.

There were several projects to solve this communications problem during the end of the 19th century. After the study of possible variants, the final project, which linked the towns of La Robla in León and Balmaseda in Biscay, the work of the prestigious mining engineer from Guipuzcoa, Mariano Zuaznavar, was presented to the Cortes on 26 November 1889. Zuaznavar (1841–1916), with great experience in mining operations, convinced the Bilbao businessmen of the economic interest of investing in the project, in such a way that the shareholders of the railroad were also the owners of the mining operations. The works were carried out very quickly. On 6 October 1892 —in barely two years— the first section was inaugurated, between Valmaseda and Espinosa de los Monteros, 45 km long and overcoming one of the greatest unevenness of the route. The main section of the line (Valmaseda-La Robla) was inaugurated in 1894, barely four years after the beginning of the works. Subsequently, two branches were added to connect with the cities of León and Bilbao.

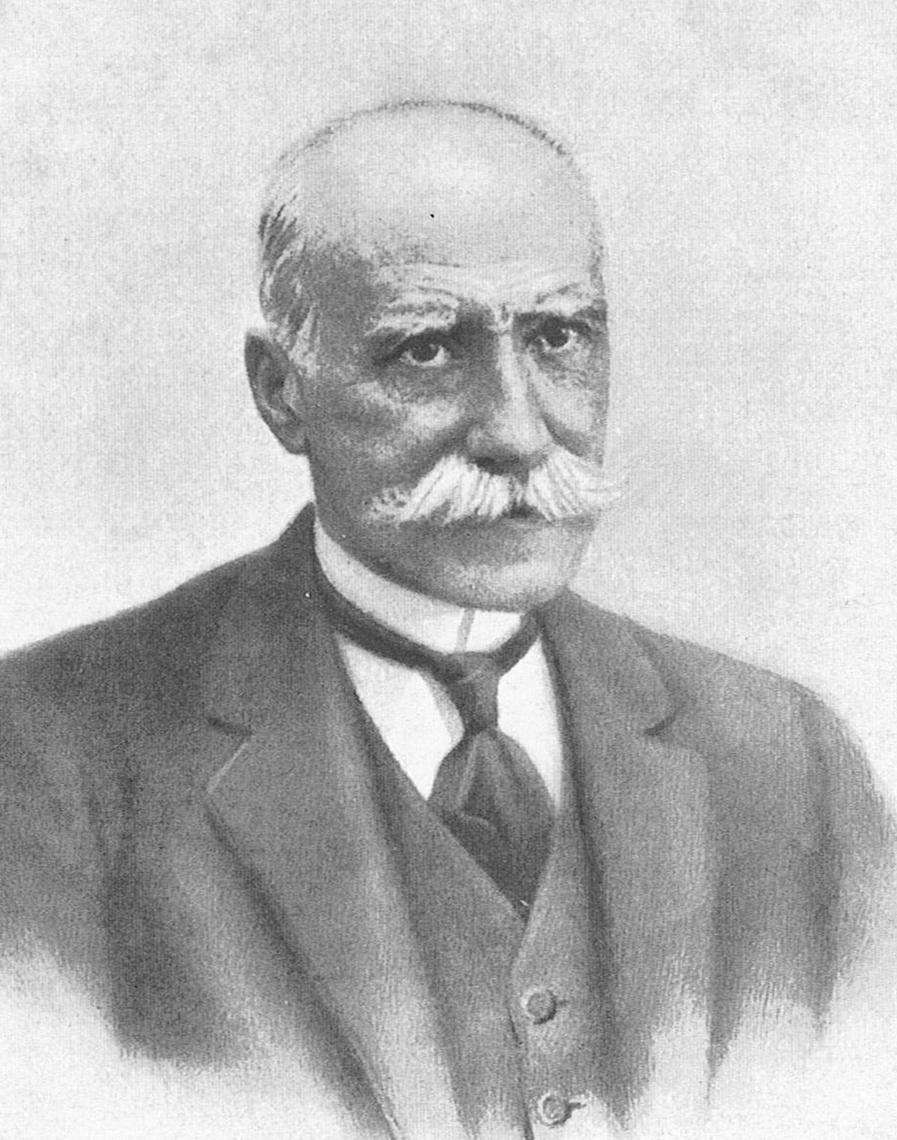
Mariano Zuaznavar is a key figure in the history of mining in Palencia. The engineer from Guipuzcoa was employed from 1878 onwards as facultative director of the Orbó mines, where he designed a masterpiece of mining engineering of the time: the Orbó Underground Canal. Later, in 1889, he was the promoter and designer of La Robla railway, which was the definitive boost to the mining industry in Palencia.

Basin production up to World War I (Metric tons)
	1904	1905	1906	1907	1908	1909	1910	1911	1912	1913
Black Coal	105 000	98 000	110 000	105 000	140 000	135 000	130 000	120 000	105 000	125 000
Anthracite	24 000	23 000	8000	10 000	12 000	32 000	45 000	47 000	62 000	62 000
Source: El verdadero despertar de la hulla leonesa Mineros y minas. Historia del carbón de antracita en la Montaña Palentina.

==== The take-off ====
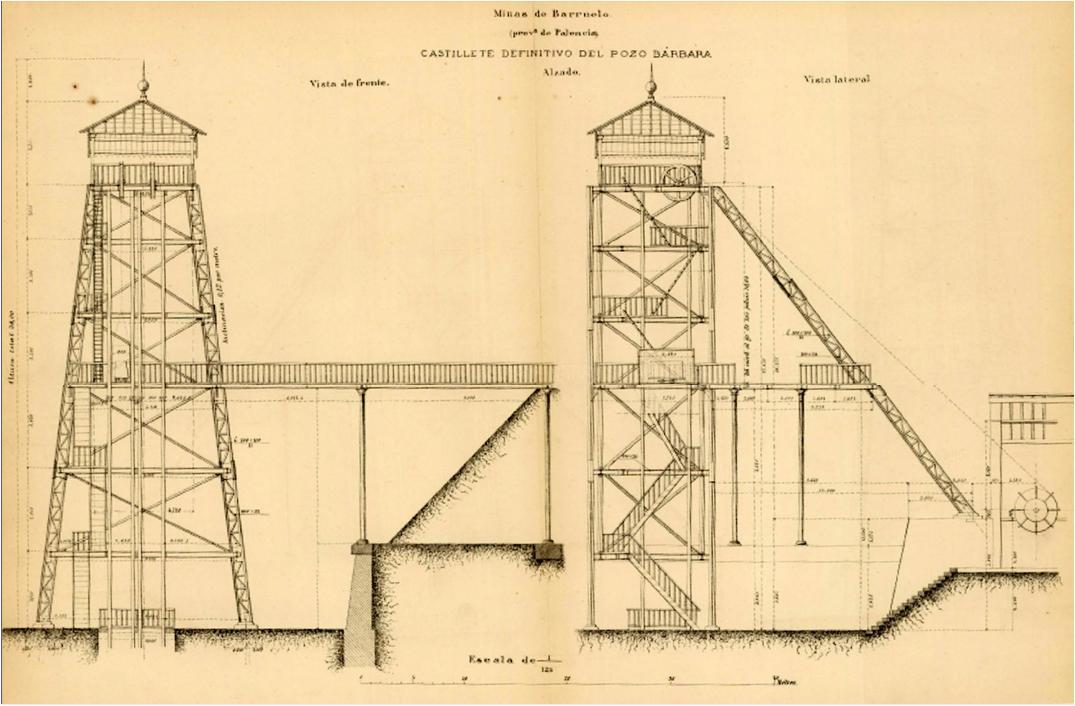
Sketch of the Bárbara shaft headframe (first master shaft of Palencia's mining industry) near Barruelo, imported from a Belgian mine. It was made of iron and was 28 m high. This plan was published in the Revista Minera in 1883, which was when the structure, later dismantled, was installed.

The First World War (1914–1918) meant a great increase in the national coal production, particularly in the Palencia basin. The great demand caused by the cessation of exports from large producers such as the United Kingdom, added to the improvement in local infrastructures, especially thanks to La Robla railway, which ran through practically the entire basin, allowed the sector to experience a boom for which it was not prepared, so prices skyrocketed. During this period, from 63,906 ton of anthracite extracted in 1914 to 228,762 ton in 1918, the transport capacity of the coal railroad was reduced during this period. This bonanza allowed important extractive companies to emerge in the area: Minera San Luis in Guardo, Antracitas de Velilla in Velilla del Río Carrión, Minas de Castilla la Vieja y Jaén in Villaverde de la Peña, and the Sociedad Cántabro Bilbaína in Santibáñez de la Peña.

The Barruelo coal basin, on the other hand, had maintained during this period a production destined to feed the locomotives of the Compañía de Ferrocarriles del Norte, which was also the owner of the exploitations, after buying them from the Sociedad de Crédito Español. In 1922, the company subdivided its different activities and created the company Minas de Barruelo, absorbing the Orbó mines in 1929, leaving the entire coal mining area in the hands of the same company. This basin was hardly affected by the crisis in the sector in the 1920s, caused by the end of the Great War, as it continued to sell its production to the railroads.

==== Workers Revolution and Civil War ====
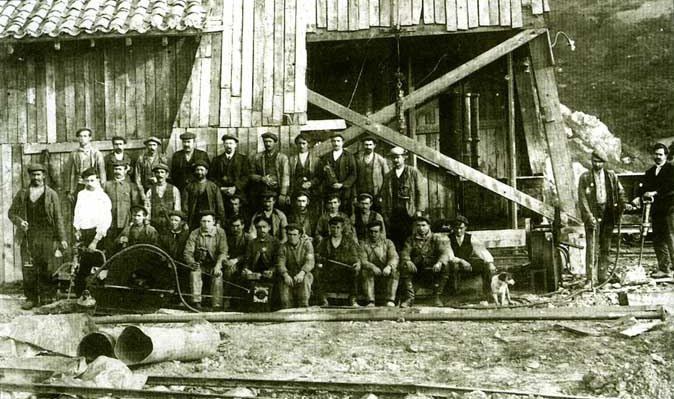
A group of workers during the drilling of the Pozo Calero, which was carried out between 1910 and 1911. El Calero, the most emblematic shaft in the coal basin, stood out for its large ashlar headframe, a facility that can still be visited today. This shaft also has the worst accident record in the basin, and was the scene of the worst accident in its history, on 21 April 1941, when 18 miners died and 19 were injured due to a firedamp explosion.

- Beginnings of trade unionism

The working conditions in the mines at the beginning of the 20th century have been defined by historians as deplorable. At the end of the Restoration, workers' associations had already acquired a certain importance, and with the advent of the Second Republic (1931), the trade union centers gained special prominence in the area, especially the Sindicato Minero Castellano de la Unión General de Trabajadores, of socialist ideology.

By the end of the 1920s the trade union movement had acquired growing importance in the Barruelo basins, where the UGT already had about 900 members, and Guardo, where in 1932, with those of Velilla and Villanueva, it had 901 members. Thus, the first important mobilizations of the mining sector in Palencia took place: in September 1933 the first great mining strike was declared in the region, supported by almost all the miners (about 3500 at that time), demanding better working conditions, and which lasted for 24 days. The miners' demands were met by the employers due to their perseverance.

On the other hand, the political influence was already great in the society of the time. In the summer of 1934, in the towns of Barruelo and Guardo, there were rallies of socialist militants with thousands of attendees from the provinces of Palencia, León and Santander, which constituted a great demonstration of strength.

- Workers' revolution

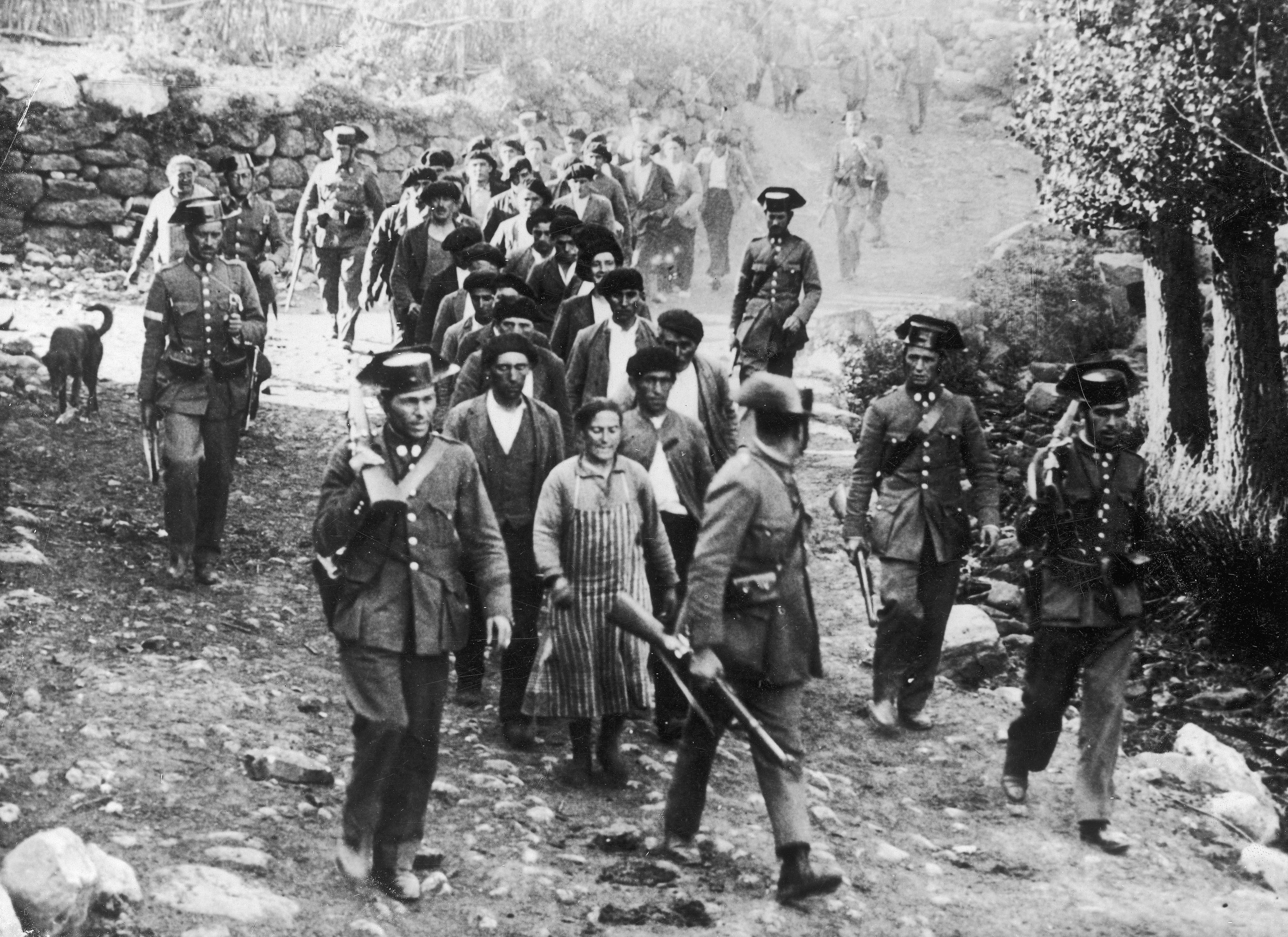
A column of Civil Guards with miners captured in the nearby mountains crosses Brañosera towards Barruelo de Santullán, on 8 October 1934.

When the Second Republic was proclaimed, Palencia produced about 200,000 tons of black coal and 100,000 tons of anthracite per year. After the triumph of the CEDA in the 1933 elections, the unions and left-wing political groups encouraged the so-called Revolution of 1934, which resulted in serious disturbances in the north of Palencia. On 5 October, the miners of Barruelo took up arms and took control of the town, resulting in the death of a lieutenant colonel and two members of the Civil Guard, as well as the director of the Colegio Marista, Plácido Fábrega Juliá, known as Brother Bernardo and beatified by the Catholic Church in 2007. The socialist mayor and four miners were also killed in these clashes. In Guardo, the miners stormed and set fire to the Civil Guard barracks, losing the life of an officer during the clashes. The arrival of the army caused the revolutionaries to flee to the mountains, who later surrendered to the authorities. In the Barruelo basin, 130 workers were arrested, while in the Guardo basin, historian Faustino Narganes Quijano points out that 236 were arrested, all of them being transferred to the provincial prison of Burgos. In addition, there was a strong repression of the miners' collective and the dismissal of the leaders of the town councils of Guardo and Barruelo. Due to the escapes and arrests, at the end of 1935 the mining industries had approximately 40% of their workforces.

- Civil War

The repression of the miners and the suppression of their unions meant that the Civil War did not have great repercussions in the area, which quickly fell into the hands of the rebel side. When the uprising took place, the miners declared a general strike and many of them fled to the mountains, establishing the front in the vicinity of Barruelo and the border with Cantabria. These fighters then went to Reinosa, while those from Guardo went to Cistierna, to fight with the Republican side.

After the conflict ended, the collective was not spared from Franco's repression and continued to pay the consequences of the events of 1934. It is estimated that about 120 residents of Barruelo, Brañosera, Orbó and Vallejo de Orbó were killed during this period. According to historian Pablo García Colmenares, "the mining community would be forced to endure, until the sixties, the new situation of subjugation and control".

==== The autarky ====
The autarky established by Franco's regime, forced by the international isolation to which it was subjected in its early years, resorted to coal as the main source of energy, so the basin was greatly favored, experiencing significant progress during the 1950s. This increase in production was not accompanied by an improvement in the productive structure, so the mining industry became obsolete and this flourishing period was the precursor of its definitive crisis.

After the war, the Baruelan mines became state property, specifically belonging to the state railroad network and managed by RENFE. Once again, the black coal was used to fuel the boilers of the company's old steam locomotives. However, the mismanagement became evident when at the end of the decade RENFE began the electrification of its lines, and the coal region lost its main client. This fact, together with the beginning of imports of other energy sources, meant an insurmountable obstacle for the management of the exploitations, so the State decided to privatize them.

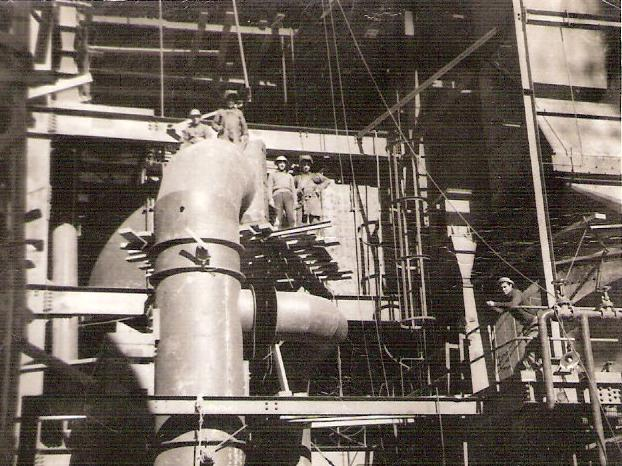
A group of workers during the construction of the thermal power plant in 1962. This facility was built to take advantage of the coal production of the basin, of which it was the main customer until the mines were closed. It consumed 222,169 ton of coal during its first year of operation.

- The Velilla Power Plant

The project to build a thermal power plant in the area was conceived at the end of the 1950s to take advantage of the coal production in the basin. The company Iberduero —under the name of Terminor, S. A., in partnership with Electra de Viesgo— chose a site adjacent to the Carrión River, within the municipality of Velilla del Río Carrión. Connected to the electricity grid in June 1964, the thermal power plant became the main recipient of coal from Palencia, guaranteeing the survival of many of its exploitations. The percentages of coal acquired for consumption represented up to 80% of the production of some of the mining companies in the area. During its first year of operation, the plant consumed 222,169 ton of coal.

==== Decline ====
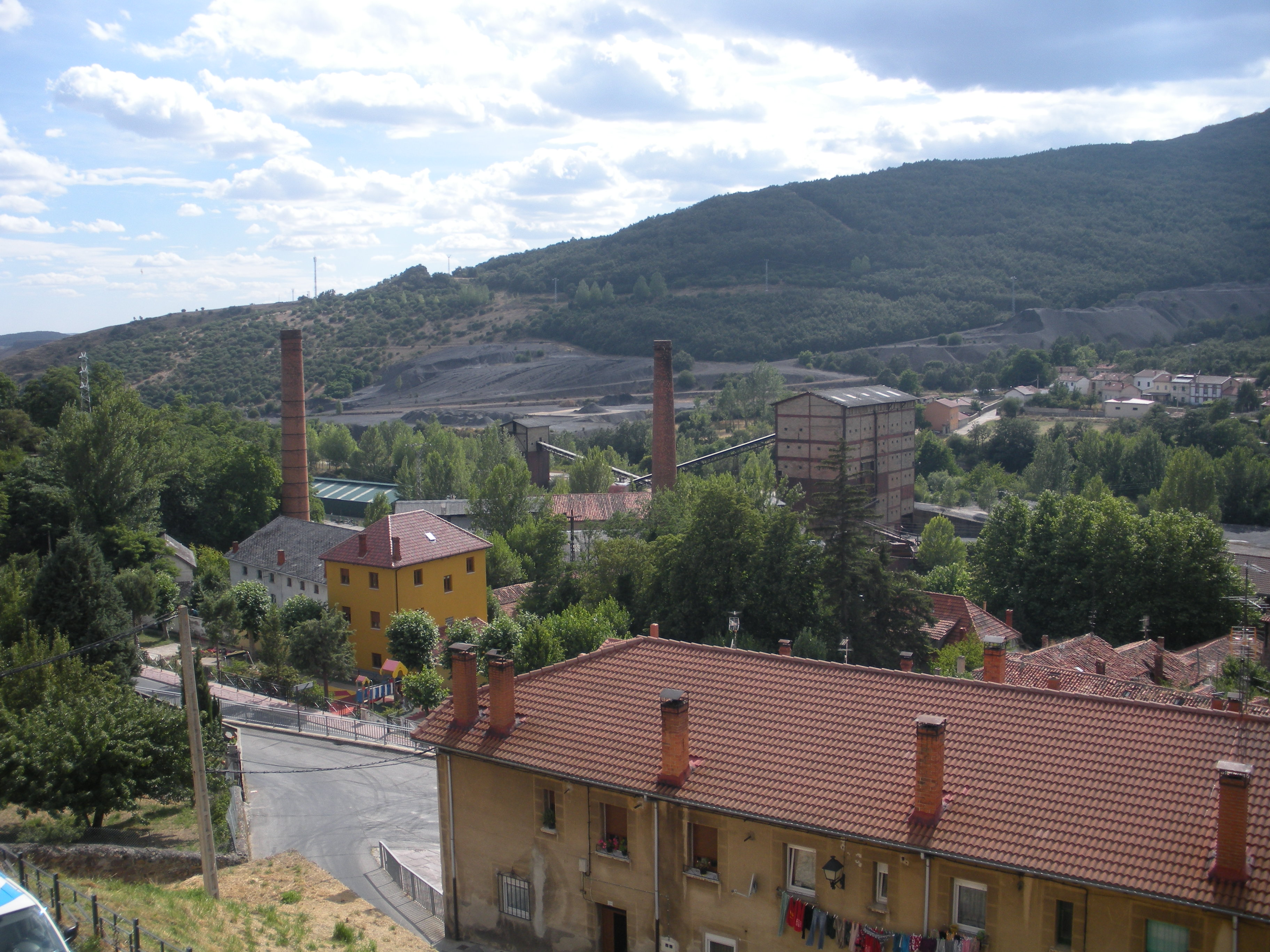
Image of Barruelo de Santullán in August 2010. In the foreground can be seen the industrial and washing facilities of Hullera Vasco Leonesa, and in the background the large dumps of the coal mines.

In 1966 the Hullera Vasco-Leonesa Mining Company acquired the Barruelo mines, presenting an ambitious restructuring project aimed at improving the productivity of its coal basin. But in 1967, alleging the failure of the State to comply with the agreements reached, the company declared the total crisis of the facilities and requested the Labor Delegation to close them and dismiss all its employees. In spite of the serious economic consequences of the closure for both the basin and the State, between 1969 and 1972, all the operations in the area were closed, which led to a significant emigration of the population. The last attempt to reactivate the basin took place in 1980, when the company Hullas de Barruelo, S. A. (HUBASA) was formed and took over the operations with an initial staff of 50 workers.

Mining companies, location and number of employees in 1980.
Company	Location	N.° of miners inland
Antracitas de Velilla	Velilla del Río Carrión	268
Sociedad Minera San Luis	Guardo	132
Minas de San Cebrián	San Cebrián de Mudá	119
Cántabro Bilbaína	Santibáñez de la Peña	103
Antracitas de San Claudio	Castrejón de la Peña	82
Floreal Llorente	Santibáñez de la Peña	70
Antracitas Valdehaya	Guardo	56
Hullas de Barruelo	Barruelo de Santullán	50
Antracitas Mina Eugenia	San Salvador de Cantamuda	33
González Tejerina	Redondo-Areños	25
Nemesio y José	Santibáñez de la Peña	16
Carbones San Isidro y María	Guardo	13
Felipe Villanueva	Dehesa de Montejo	7
Antracitas del Campo	San Salvador de Cantamuda	7
	TOTAL	981

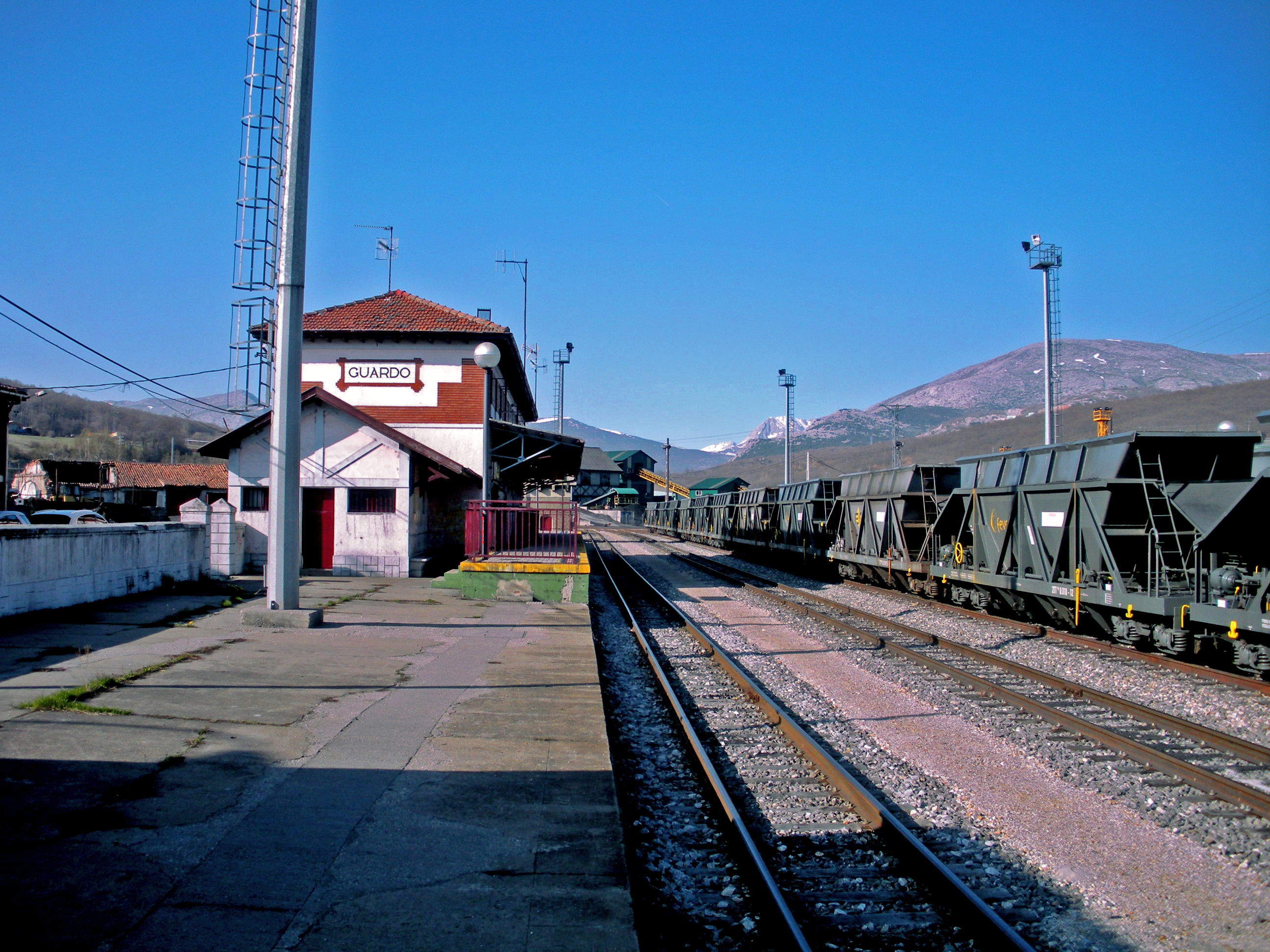
Guardo FEVE station with coal hoppers for the thermal power plant. During the hectic mobilizations at the end of the 1980s, the miners cut the railway traffic as a protest measure against the closure of the mines.

Spain's entry into the European Economic Community in 1986 went from being a threat to Palencia's mining industry to the material closure of many of its installations, since the Community policy set guidelines in line with the progressive closure of all unprofitable mines. From that year onwards there was a period of strikes, with the aim of avoiding the dismantling of the basins. Thus, between 1985 and 1991, four general strikes were called in the sector. In May 1988, the mining industry in Palencia experienced its most agitated mobilizations, being paralyzed by protests and manifestations due to the negotiations of the collective bargaining agreement. In Guardo, the miners blocked the accesses by road and the entrance to the railroad at the Velilla thermal power plant, leading to confrontations with the anti-riot troops sent to the area.

On 20 December 1989, the European Commission issued its decision to initiate the coal mining reconversion process and the reduction of aid to the Spanish Government, which began to subsidize those mines that reduced their production. This coincided with the crisis of the Bergel Group, a mining company which grouped together the companies Antracitas de Besande (with operations in Velilla del Río Carrión), Cántabro Bilbaína (with activities in Villanueva de Arriba and Santibáñez de la Peña) and Felipe Villanueva (Villaverde de la Peña and Dehesa de Montejo). Bergel filed for bankruptcy in June 1990, causing the disappearance of the three Palencia farms and the dismissal of its 328 employees.

Anthracite production 1970s and national percentage (Thousands T)
	1970	1971	1972	1973	1974	1975	1976	1977	1978	1979
Palencia	317	358	373	376	359	374	390	390	367	368
Spain	2 808	2 876	3 013	2 889	2 948	3 154	3 548	3 768	3 801	3 645
% Palencia	11,2	12,4	12,3	13,0	12,1	11,8	10,9	10,3	9,6	10,0

==== Dismantling ====
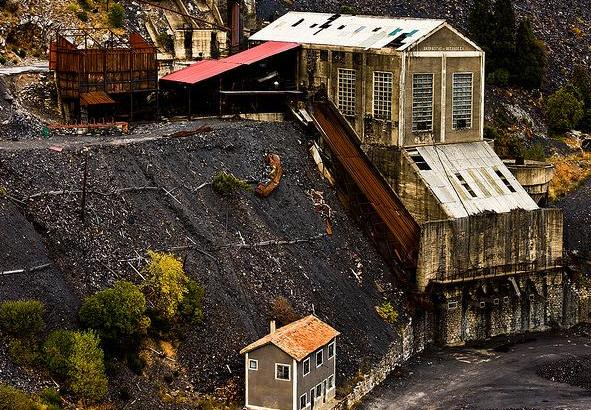
Image of the Antracitas de Besande facilities in the municipality of Velilla del Río Carrión. This exploitation was involved in the bankruptcy of the Bergel Group in 1990, and since then it has been abandoned.

The closure of mining facilities in Montaña Palentina was progressive since 1990. Antracitas Valdehaya in Guardo and Minera Palentina in Lores were added to the closures of the Bergel Group. During this period, open pit mining of coal reserves also began in Guardo and Velilla del Río Carrión. Despite being considered essential by the businessmen for the survival of the sector, the open-pit mines aroused from the beginning the mistrust of part of the population, who, through anti-cutting coordinators, opposed the projects, arguing ecological reasons.

In October 1998, Hullas de Barruelo became part of Unión Minera del Norte (UMINSA), owned by the Victorino Alonso group, which controlled most of the mining operations in the north of the country. The dependence of the Barruelo basin on public subsidies was already very great, and after successive cuts in these subsidies, on 1 September 2005, UMINSA closed its last facility in the coal mining area, transferring its 40 workers to its facilities at "El Abuelo" in Velilla del Río Carrión.

In September 1999, the Junta of Castile and León authorized the takeover by UMINSA of all the remaining companies in the sector in the Palencia basin: Antracitas de Velilla in Velilla del Rio Carrion, Antracitas del Norte in Aviñante and Velilla de Tarilonte, Sociedad Minera San Luis in Guardo, Antracitas de San Claudio (which a few months earlier had closed its last subway mine) in Castrejon de la Peña and Antracitas de Montebismo in La Pernia. Only San Isidro, with a small operation in Velilla del Río Carrión, remained outside the domain of Victorino Alonso's group. At that time, 635 workers were employed in the basin, and its total production was 520,000 ton (Note: Includes raw data for black coal and anthracite production.) per year.

However, UMINSA continued with the policy of closing operations started years before: thus, in 2003 it closed the last shaft of the company San Luis in Guardo, and in 2004 the Peruscales shaft (the last one in the Sierra del Brezo, in Aviñante) and the "Montebismo" in San Juan de Redondo (the last mining operation in La Pernía). In Velilla del Río Carrión, in 2007, work ceased in "El Abuelo", concentrating the activity in the Las Cuevas shaft, located next to the border with the province of León.

==== Expectations ====
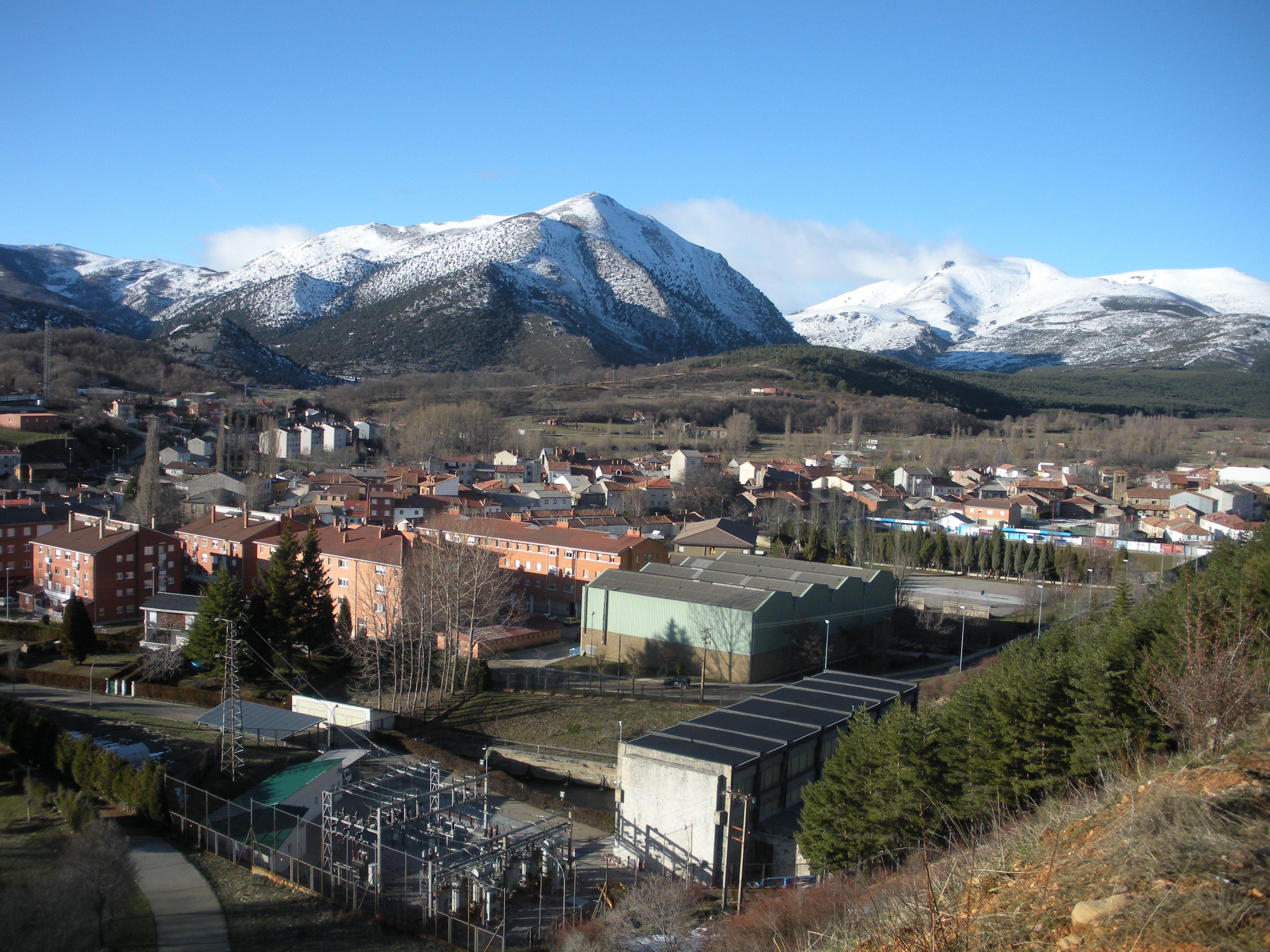
Velilla del Río Carrión, one of the main centers of the Palencia anthracite industry, and which since 2005 has housed the only two subway mines remaining in the region: Carbones San Isidro y María, owned by Fernando García Brugos, and the Las Cuevas pit, which belonged to UMINSA, the main national company in the sector, and whose president was Victorino Alonso.

In 2009, the only active mining shafts in the province of Palencia were located in the municipality of Velilla del Río Carrión and were "San Isidro", owned by Carbones San Isidro y María, with 16 employees, and "Las Cuevas", owned by UMINSA and considered the most modern mine in Europe. However, both mines ceased operations in 2014. UMINSA is also the owner of the only two open pit mines, located near the towns of Muñeca de la Peña and Traspeña de la Peña, which, together with the Las Cuevas pit, employ 140 workers.

The future of the activity was uncertain when the European Union proposed to maintain public aid to the sector until 2014, on the condition that all the loss-making farms, including all those in Asturias, León and Palencia, would close that year. The fear of the disappearance of the activity in the Palencia basin led the Junta of Castile and León to ally with the employers and trade unions seeking the support of the Government to try to rectify this proposal of the European Commission.

The situation in the basin became even more complicated when in the summer of 2010, due to its lack of liquidity, UMINSA (attributing its situation to the fact that the thermal power plants had stopped acquiring coal) stopped paying the miners' salaries in July. Faced with this prospect, on 2 September 52 miners began a lockout inside the Las Cuevas shaft, demanding a solution to their situation. The miners abandoned the blockade 27 days later, on 29 September, when the European Commission authorized the Spanish government to subsidize electricity companies that use indigenous coal for their production. Initially, the Commission confirmed 31 December 2014 as the deadline for these subsidies, but, following a new proposal, in December it extended the deadline to 2018.

Evolution of production (tons per year)
	1998	1999	2000	2001	2002	2003	2004	2005	2006	2007
Anthracite	349 909	212 671	366 056	386 729	348 822	321 692	285 018	357 022	451 686	415 962
Black Coal	127 094	120 451	115 640	112 800	98 270	107 293	95 810	0	0	0

=== Product destination ===
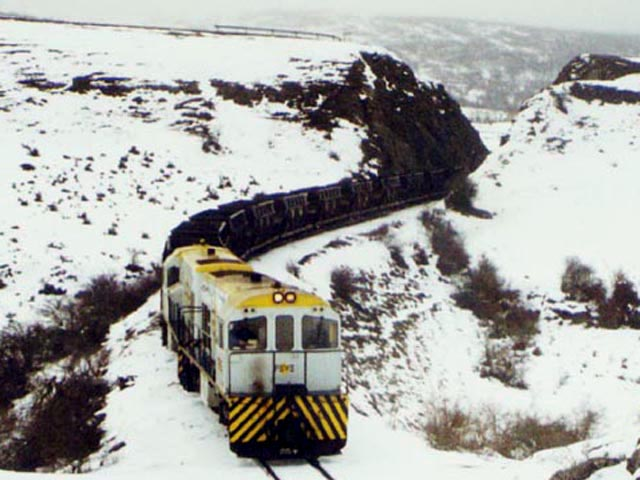
Two 1500 locomotives of La Robla railway with a coal convoy leaving a trench in the snow, next to Mataporquera, in 1998. The disappearance of coal transport to the steel industry in Bilbao led to the closure of the line in 1991. In 1995, it was reopened thanks to public investments and since then it has maintained an important activity of coal transport to different thermal power stations.

The destination of the coal extracted in the Palencia basin varied over the years according to industrial needs. With the inauguration of La Robla railroad in 1894, the Basque iron and steel industry was the preferred destination for the coal mines in Palencia and León. The coal transported by the coal carrier in its first years of operation was as follows:

Transportation of coal by La Robla railway
	1895	1897	1899	1901	1903	1905	1907	1909	1911	1913
Tons	17 378	48 906	107 413	163 381	135 811	128 694	189 248	140 556	163 552	223 629

In the 1950s, coal consumption in Spain diversified by sectors, with an increase in its use due to the autarky at the beginning of the Franco regime. In 1950, 24% of the production was dedicated to railroads, 12% to thermal power stations, 10% to domestic consumption, 6% to the cement industry, 3.6% to mining, 3.3% to marine navigation and 3.1% to the textile industry as main consumers.

In 1958, La Robla train reached its record of coal transported, with 908,464 tons, although this was only the starting point of its definitive decline. From 1964, with the start-up of the Velilla thermal power plant, this installation was the main consumer of coal from Palencia. In its first year of operation, the plant consumed 222,169 tons of coal, of which 141,259 tons were anthracite and the rest black coal. In 1968, of the 246,484 ton of anthracite consumed by the plant, (Note: It also consumed 80,910 ton of black coal; no data is available as to what percentage was from the Palencia coal basin.) 179,573 ton came from the Palencia basin, which produced 371,348 ton that year, thus devoting 48.3% of its production to Terminor.

The electrification of the RENFE lines at the end of the 1950s, which meant the end of its consumption of black coal, and already in the 1970s, the search for more profitable alternatives to feed the blast furnaces, industrial restructuring and the dismantling of a large part of the blast furnaces led to the disappearance of coal consumption in both industries, which meant the beginning of the end of the sector. In 1984, the expansion of the Velilla thermal power plant took place, which increased the coal quotas, adversely affected by the beginning of the import of foreign coal by Iberdrola. In 2008, the coal quota that UMINSA, the coal mining company in the Palencia basin, had been allocated for the Velilla thermal power plant was 450,000 ton per year.

=== Working conditions ===
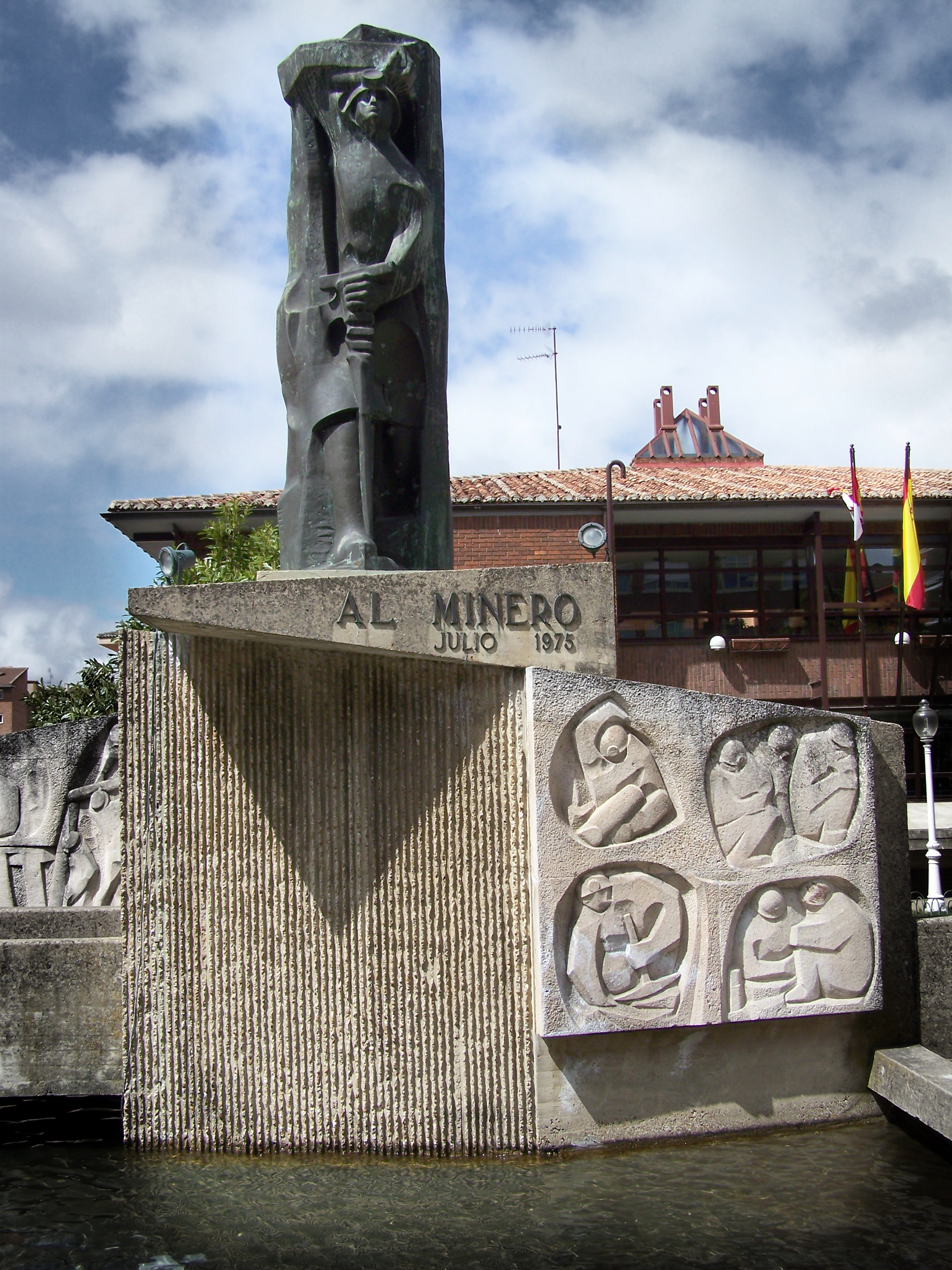
Monument to the Miner of Guardo. It is a 4 m high bronze figure erected on a concrete pedestal in which mining scenes are represented. The set, which is completed by a pond, was inaugurated in July 1975, and the sculpture is the work of Jacinto Higueras Cátedra. It is a tribute to the figure of the miner and is considered the most emblematic monument of the town.

The hard working conditions in the mines, especially in the first years of their exploitation, meant that the accident rate in the Palencia basin was very high. The most serious accident in its history occurred in the famous Pozo Calero de Barruelo, when on 21 April 1941, 18 miners died and another 19 were injured due to a firedamp explosion. The "Calero", closed in 2002, has, according to the records of the Mines Headquarters, the sad record of having registered for years an average of 12 deaths per year. For a time, the Barruelo mines were considered the most dangerous in Spain. The book El Pozo Calero documents the data of 165 miners who died in the area between 1915 and 2000.

The mines in the anthracite basin were free of firedamp, so most of the accidents that occurred in these mines were due to collapses in the galleries. According to the archives of the mining section of the Territorial Service of Industry, Commerce and Tourism of the Junta of Castile and León, between 1956 and 1997 alone, 116 miners died in this area as a result of occupational accidents.

The physical consequences of working in the mines were also felt among the mining population, especially those suffering from an occupational disease: silicosis. One of the greatest experts on the subject, the Palencia physician Silvano Izquierdo, defined this disease as "a pulmonary fibrosis caused by the prolonged inhalation of siliceous dust". In 1980 a study was carried out on the subject, titled Estudio sobre la silicosis en Palencia, by the Lung and Heart Service of the San Telmo Provincial Hospital of Palencia, published by the Tello Téllez de Meneses Institution. According to this study, between 1973 and 1978 Social Security diagnosed a total of 832 cases of silicosis in the Palencia basin. This data contrasts with those offered by the Technical Qualifying Commission of occupational diseases in Palencia, which between 1974 and 1979 carried out 2463 examinations, determining 1282 cases. This study emphasizes the importance of the fact that silicosis is the most frequent respiratory disease in the whole province.

=== Influence exerted by mining activity ===
==== Physical environment ====
Coal mining has caused a scene of disorganization in a large part of Montaña Palentina, caused by the large dumps and the headframes of abandoned shafts. This landscape, together with the presence of mine entrances and railway installations, has become common in the places where there were mining operations, and in recent years the institutions have tried to turn it into a tourist resource through the National Plan for Industrial Heritage, although their interventions have been minimal.

One of the mining activities with the greatest environmental impact is open-pit mining. The first clear-cutting carried out in the Barruelo basin, by HUBASA in 1993, was debated in the Cortes of Castile and León, where it was considered an "ecological disaster" by a socialist representative. At the beginning of the 1980s, the first clearings carried out in the region of Guardo awakened an important citizen movement against this type of exploitation. In 2006, the president of UMINSA, Victorino Alonso, presented a proposal to the town council of Guardo demanding the open-pit exploitation of 500 ha within the municipality, committing himself to hire all the local youth. The local Anti-Cutting Platform mobilized to warn of its distrust of the proposal and the full council unanimously decided to reject the offer, in addition to declaring protected all public forest in the municipality to prevent future clearing.

According to a report published in 1988 by the Consejería de Fomento of the Junta of Castile and León, open-pit mining had caused severe environmental impacts in the region caused by discharges from washes, runoff from dumps and the disappearance of vegetation cover, generating a significant alteration in an environment of great scenic value. It also cites as one of the areas subject to the greatest alteration the Corcos mountain, in the municipality of Guardo, where the largest and highest quality Quercus pyrenaica forest in the province is located, altered by mining activity. In the area around Barruelo, the study refers to the serious environmental impact produced by the inland mining dumps, as well as the pollution suffered by the Rubagón river.

==== Demographics ====
The influence of the mining industry on the demography of the main population centers in the area was decisive. The following table shows the evolution of the population in the main municipalities from 1837 to the present.

	1837	1850	1877	1900	1910	1920	1930	1940	1950	1970	1991	2001	2009
Barruelo de Santullán	30	36	3 255	3 389	4 417	6 600	8 695	7 770	7 372	4 724	2 193	1 641	1 488
Castrejón de la Peña (Note: Between 1842 and 1857 it incorporated the towns of Boedo de Castrejón, Cantoral de la Peña, Cubillo de Castrejón, Loma de Castrejón, Pisón de Castrejón, Recueva de la Peña, Roscales de la Peña, Traspeña de la Peña and Villanueva de la Peña.)	169	177	1 301	1 492	1 541	1 456	1 532	1 666	1 789	1 209	772	613	486
Cervera de Pisuerga (Note: Between 1970 and 1981 it incorporated the towns of Arbejal, Celada de Roblecedo, Herreruela de Castillería, Ligüérzana, Perazancas, Quintanaluengos, Rebanal de las Llantas, Resoba, San Martín de los Herreros, Santibáñez de Resoba and Valsadornín.)	660	784	1202	1 555	1 268	1 237	1 485	1 594	1 815	1 997	2 953	2 684	2 566
Guardo	436	625	1 014	1 216	1 506	1 801	2 343	2 427	3 757	9 012	9 458	8 548	7 400
La Pernía (Note: The data up to 1970 correspond to the municipality of San Salvador de Cantamuda, which was integrated that year into the municipality of La Pernía.)	116	114	621	611	630	591	589	738	836	600	539	471	423
Santibáñez de la Peña (Note: The data between 1837 and 1934 belong to the municipality of Respenda de la Peña, in which Santibáñez was integrated during that period.)	58	94	3 235	3 669	3 823	4 410	4 500	3 760	3 872	3 147	1 912	1 500	1 266
Velilla del Río Carrión (Note: Until 1949 it was called Velilla de Guardo.)	264	385	497	542	589	662	876	1 032	1 048	2 125	2 103	1 767	1 521
Source: Narganes Quijano (1837), Madoz (1850) and INE (the rest)

Note: In color, the maximums reached. The color corresponds to the color assigned to the same municipality in the graph on the right.

==== Economy ====
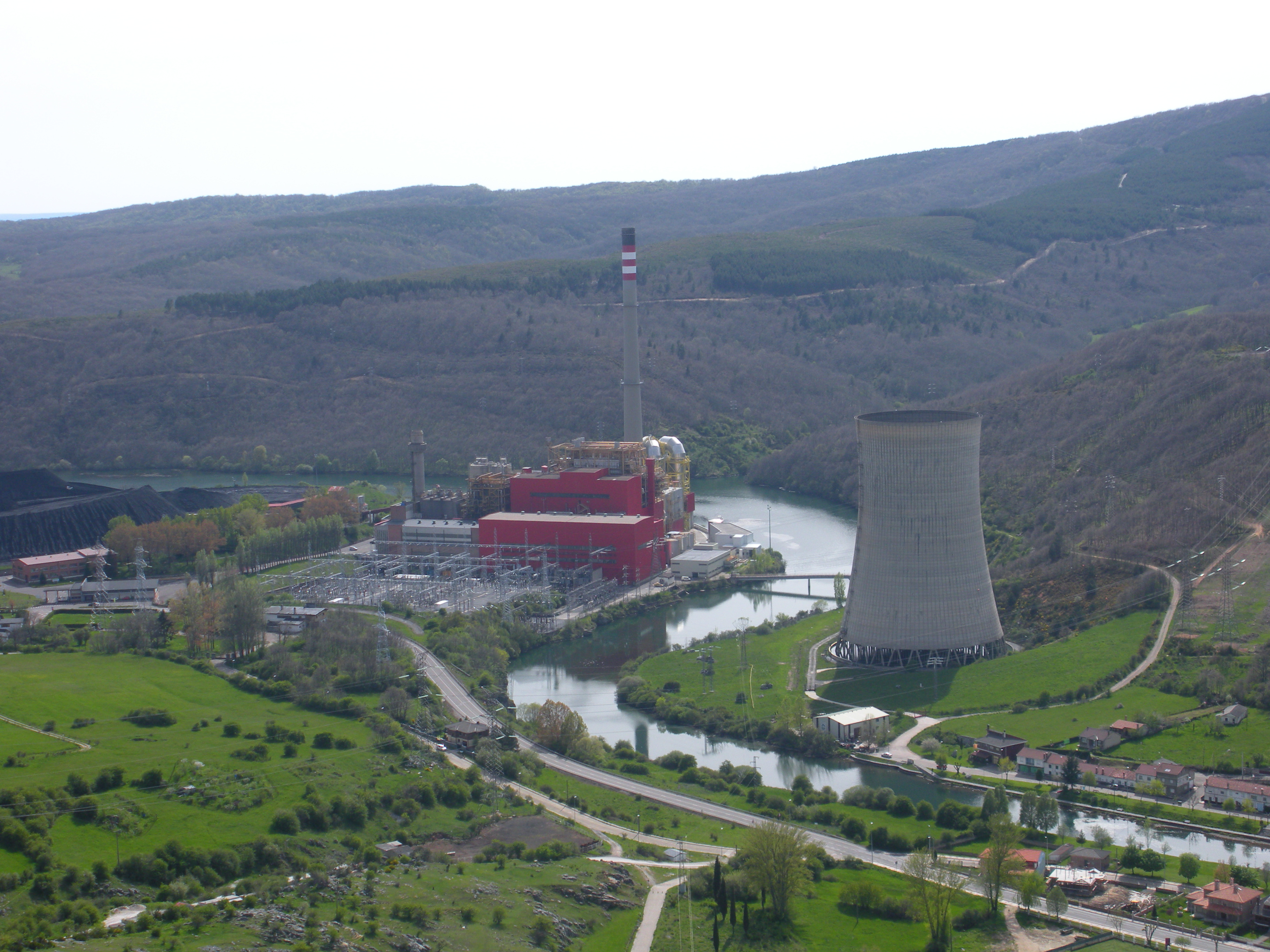
General view of the Velilla thermal power plant, with Grupo II (completed in 1984) already built. Iberdrola's facility was built to take advantage of the area's coal production, and has historically been its main customer. Despite the beginning of the use of imported coal, in 2008, the coal quota that UMINSA (owner of the Palencia and Leon basin mines) had been allocated by the plant was still 450,000 tons per year, still higher than the 415,962 tons produced by the entire basin in 2007.

The economic activity of the area before the appearance of coal was based on subsistence economy, with agriculture and livestock being its basic activities, as well as the use of its forest resources. With the proliferation of mining exploitations, the inhabitants of the region dedicated themselves to work in the mines, which turned this activity into the main economic resource of Montaña Palentina throughout the 20th century. In addition to the direct jobs generated by the mining industry, many other indirect jobs were created, derived from the maintenance and repair of the infrastructures used by the mines and the transport of materials. During the boom of the 1950s, there was also a significant proliferation of stores and entertainment venues, supported by the economic bonanza of the decade.

With the beginning of the dismantling of the mines, the government, through the Ministry of Industry and Energy, launched the Coal Mining and Alternative Development Plan for the Mining Regions (Plan Miner) with the aim of reactivating the economy of the mining areas in recession, which, however, has not been able to alleviate the gradual loss of inhabitants in the region.

==== Sociology ====
The influence of mining activity on the sociology of the region has manifested itself in very different ways throughout its almost two centuries of existence. The first substantial modification it produced in its social environment was the transformation of a society dedicated in a high percentage to agriculture and animal husbandry, which started to massively adopt mining as a means of subsistence.

The mining companies would have a great influence on the society of the time. In the middle of the 19th century, these companies began to finance the construction of houses for the workers, which, together with the labor commissaries that were set up, and the creation of schools, cultural and financial centers, such as the Caja de Socorros Mutuos (a provident fund to cover sick leave) and savings banks, meant that the companies had almost absolute control of the towns.

Another phenomenon that took place, as opposed to the previous one, and profusely studied in literary circles, was that of workers' associations, which began in 1900, when the syndicate La Unión was created in Barruelo de Santullán. This associationism would have special repercussions in events such as the Workers' Revolution of 1934.

After the Civil War, and benefited by the protectionism on coal that originated the autarky and the energetic necessity, a migratory movement towards the mining basins arose with origin in more rural areas of the country, and in the 1960s it was precisely the population of the region that began an important migratory process especially with destiny to the powerful industrial fabric of Biscay.

At the end of the 20th century, the decline of mining activity brought with it a demographic phenomenon that affected the composition of the population of former mining municipalities: the majority presence of older people and retirees, caused by the emigration of the younger population to areas with more job opportunities and the increase in early retirements in the mining industry, aimed at reducing the companies' workforces. Between 1998 and 2008, more than 300 workers in the Palencia basin took early retirement, which has further reduced the percentage of the workforce.

==== Culture ====
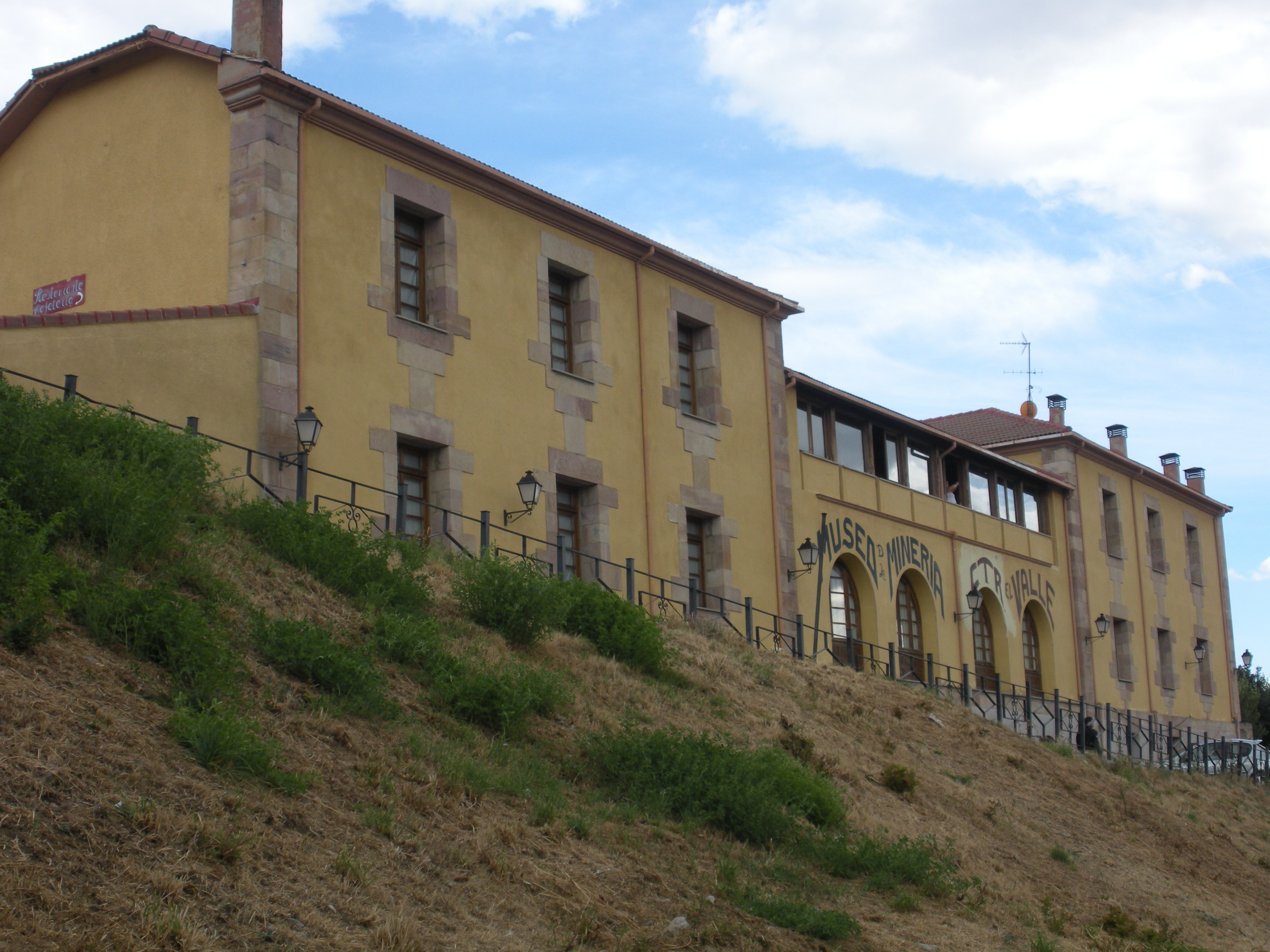
Exterior view of the Mining Museum, the exhibition area of the Mining Interpretation Center of Barruelo de Santullán. The complex is completed with a visitable mine and a cultural center, and was inaugurated in 1999 to show the activity in the mines of Barruelo since its discovery in 1838 until its final closure in 2005. The museum area is located in the building formerly occupied by the National Schools, and has 600 m^{2} of exhibition space.

Due to the growing demand for information about mining in Palencia, and to preserve its historical heritage, the Mining Interpretation Center was inaugurated in 1999 in Barruelo de Santullán. The complex consists of a mine that can be visited, a cultural center and a mining interpretation area. The museum area has 600 m^{2} of exhibition space, where the technical and human aspects of mining, as well as the geographical environment of the area, are shown through a thematic and interactive tour. During its first year of operation, the museum was visited by about 22,000 people.

In Velilla del Río Carrión, since 2007, the National Mining Shoring Contest has been held as part of the events of the mining festival, celebrated on the day of Saint Barbara (4 December). The contest consists of an exhibition of shoring similar to that carried out inside the mine, which consists of the construction and placement of wooden frames for the containment of the galleries, valuing the quality and speed used for its installation.

The thematic bibliography on the Palencia mining basin is composed of two main works: El Pozo Calero. Historia de la minería en el Valle de Santullán, written in 2003 by Fernando Cuevas, Wilfredo Román and Luis Llorente, and Mineros y minas. Historia del carbón de antracita en la Montaña Palentina (2010), by Faustino Narganes Quijano

== Related characters ==
- Ricardo Becerro de Bengoa (1845–1902): A scientist and historian from Alava who traveled through the mining basin, leaving a record of his studies in several publications, which made him the chronicler of the beginning of mining activity in Palencia. He was the one who made known the leading role of the priest Ciriaco del Río (whose testimony he collected in a book) in the discovery of ore in the province.
- Manuel Llaneza (1879–1931): Socialist trade union leader and mayor of Mieres, he lived from the age of 2 in Barruelo, in whose mines he worked from the age of 11 to 23. A street in Barruelo is named after him
- Mariano Ortega Alonso (1919–1951): Leader of the anti-Francoist guerrillas in the basin, he was a miner from Barruelo. He was captured in Bilbao in 1947 and executed in Palencia in 1951. His brother Ambrosio, who was captured with him and served 22 years in prison, was a renowned painter settled in Guardo.
- Claudio Prieto (1934–2015): Composer born in Muñeca de la Peña, where he lived as a child the events of the Civil War. He began his musical activity in the Municipal Band of Guardo, and completed his studies in Madrid.
- José María Cuevas (1935–2008): Businessman and president of the Confederación Española de Organizaciones Empresariales (CEOE) for 23 years, he was born the year after his parents had to leave their village of Barruelo de Santullán due to political problems, at a time of great social unrest.
- Pedro Miguel Barreda Marcos (1931–2016): Born in Buenavista de Valdavia, the historian, journalist and cronista dedicated the most important part of his work to Palencia's historical themes of the Modern and Contemporary Ages.
- Faustino Narganes Quijano (1948): Historian born in Traspeña de la Peña, member of the Real Academia de la Historia, he lived in first person the flourishing years of the region. He is the author of some of the most important studies on mining in Palencia, as well as the book Mineros y minas. Historia del carbón de antracita en la Montaña Palentina (2010).

== Operations ==
Main mining shafts
Name of the shaft	Municipality	Substance	Location	Opened	Closed	Notes
Pozo Peragido	Barruelo de Santullán	black coal	42.900833°N 4.275°W	1936	2005	Closed in 1969 and reopened in 1983.
Pozo Bárbara	Barruelo de Santullán	black coal	42.898889°N 4.276944°W	1878	1890	Abandoned when expectations were not met.
Pozo Calero	Barruelo de Santullán	black coal	42.912778°N 4.305556°W	1911	2002	Closed in 1972 and reopened in 1994
Pozo María del Carmen	La Pernía	anthracite	43.000833°N 4.428889°W		2004	Montebismo Group. Closed by UMINSA.
Mina Eugenia	La Pernía	anthracite	42.996667°N 4.513056°W	1950	1992	Lores. In 1992, the company ceased operations.
Pozo Pedrito Segundo	Castrejón de la Peña	anthracite	42.825278°N 4.617778°W	1965	1996	Villanueva. Flooded by the rupture of an aquifer.
Pozo Peruscales	Santibáñez de la Peña	anthracite	42.825278°N 4.695556°W		2004	Villaverde de la Peña. Closed by UMINSA.
Pozo Valdeabuelo	Santibáñez de la Peña	anthracite	42.805833°N 4.743333°W		1985	Affected by the closure of the Bergel Group.
Pozo El Abuelo	Velilla del Río Carrión	anthracite	42.847778°N 4.878056°W		2007	El Abuelo Group. Closed by UMINSA.
Pozo Las Cuevas	Velilla del Río Carrión	anthracite	42.848056°N 4.878889°W		2014	El Abuelo Group. Closed by UMINSA.
Mina Trueno	Guardo	anthracite	42.788611°N 4.883889°W	1895	1966	Mount Corcos. Closed by Sdad. Minera San Luis.
Pozo Sestil	Guardo	anthracite	42.802222°N 4.894444°W		2003	Mount Corcos. Closed by UMINSA.

== Chronology ==
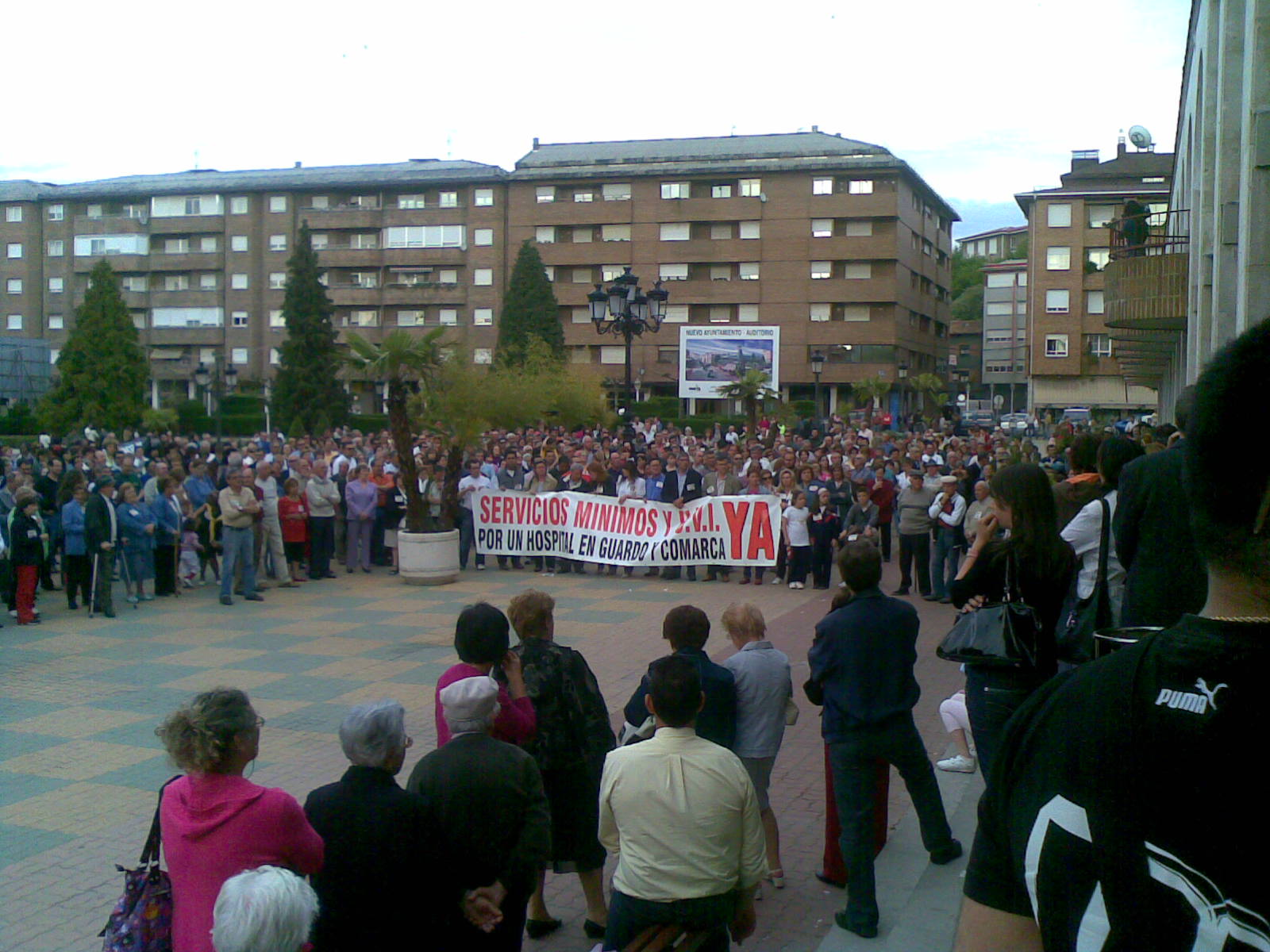
The closure of mining operations in the Guardo region has brought with it what its political representatives consider an abandonment by the administration, and there are frequent demonstrations demanding better infrastructures. In the picture, a rally held in June 2009 by residents and mayors of the region, demanding better health services for the area.

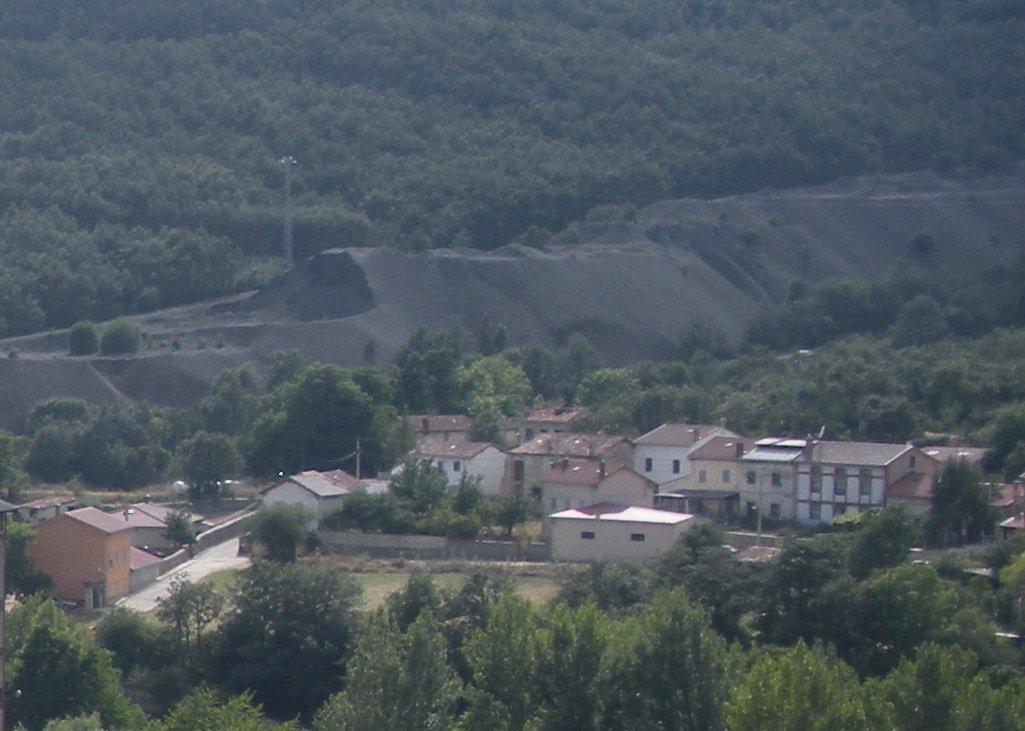
Detail of dumps next to a residential area in Barruelo. The presence of these dumps of unusable materials in the vicinity of the town is considered a serious case of environmental impact. The abandonment of mining activity in Barruelo has complicated the solution to the problem. In spite of the inactivity of the exploitations, they belong to the company UMINSA, which maintains its exploitation rights.

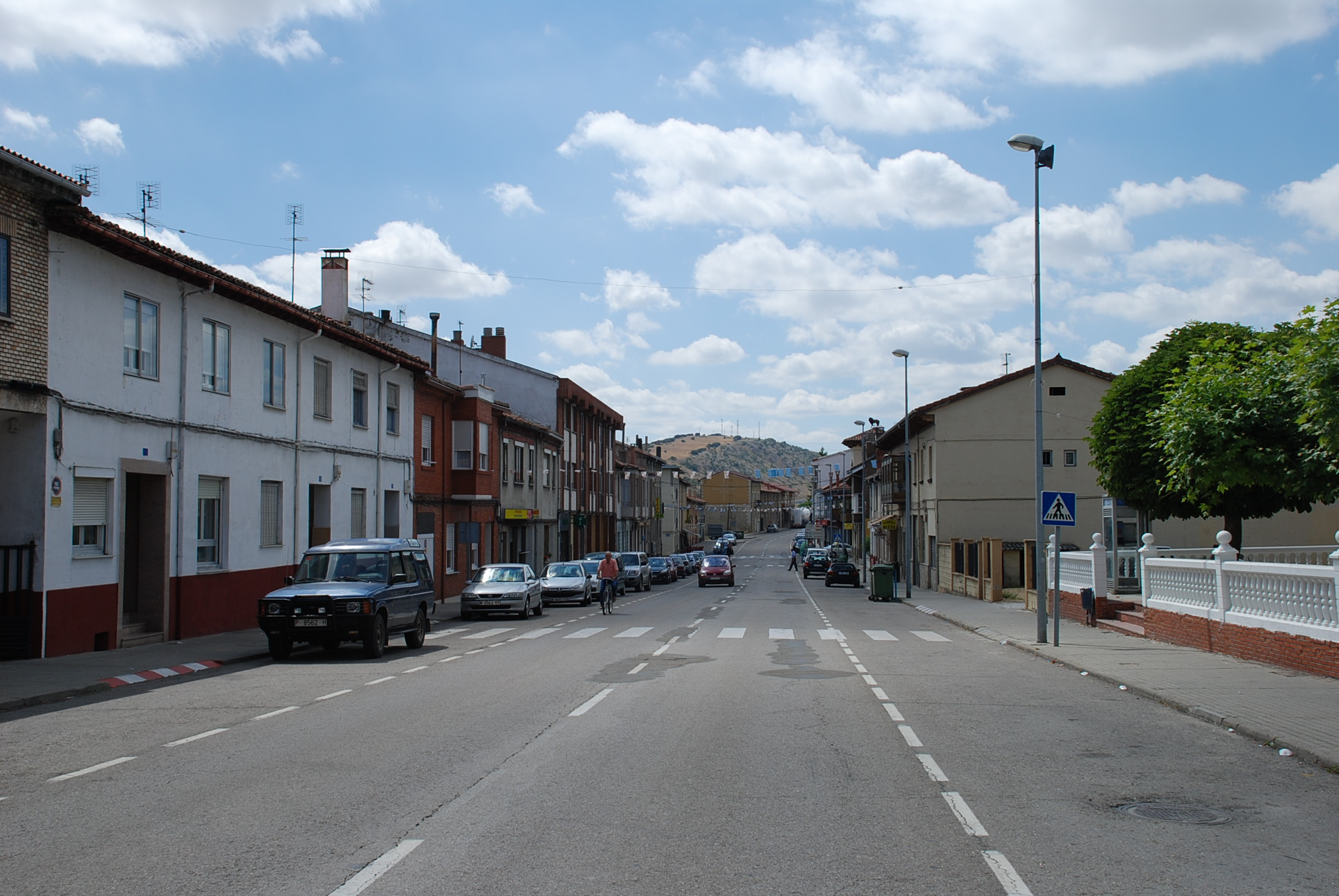
View of La Estación of Santibáñez de la Peña. This population center arose approximately 1km from the village as a result of the location there of La Robla railroad station, where coal loading was more accessible. It is a clear example of the influence of industry on the location of human settlements, and it is currently in La Estación where the main facilities of the town are located.

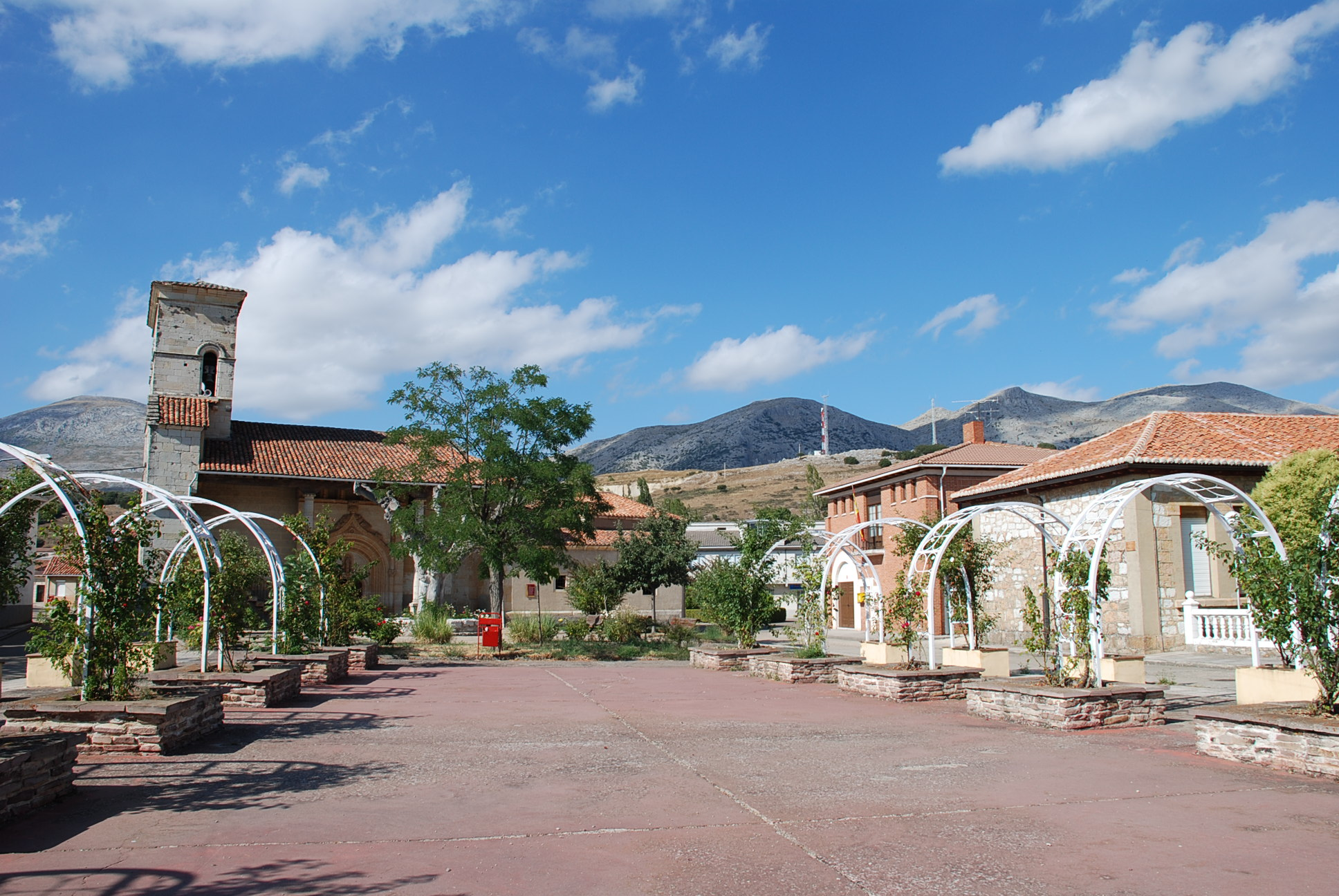
Square of Castrejón de la Peña. Mining activity in the town intensified when in 1900 Claudio López Bru, II Marquis of Comillas, took charge of the mines in the area. The arrival of the railway from La Robla to the town placed it in the center of the anthracite region, between Guardo and Cervera, and Castrejón reached its peak with 1 789 inhabitants in 1950. The crisis in the sector especially affected this town, which had 486 inhabitants in the 2009 census.

== See also ==
- Mining Basins (Asturias)
- Quintanilla de las Torres
- Verdeña
- Montaña Palentina

== Bibliography ==
- Burgos, Abilio (1980). "Estudio sobre la silicosis en Palencia". Publicaciones de la Institución Tello Téllez de Meneses (in Spanish) (44). ISSN 0210-7317.
- Cuevas, Fernando; Román, Wifredo; Llorente, Luis (2003). El Pozo Calero. Historia de la minería en el Valle de Santullán (in Spanish). Cultura & Comunicación. ISBN 978-84-607-9508-7.
- Gallego, José Andrés (1982). Revolución y restauración, 1868-1931 (in Spanish). Vol. 1. Ediciones Rialp. ISBN 978-84-321-2113-5.
- Iglesias, José Manuel; Ruiz, Leticia (2005). Actas de los XV cursos monográficos sobre el patrimonio histórico (in Spanish). University of Cantabria. ISBN 978-84-810-2969-7.
- Narganes Quijano, Faustino (2010). Mineros y minas. Historia del carbón de antracita en la Montaña Palentina (in Spanish). Aruz Ediciones. ISBN 978-84-614-2142-8.

=== Additional bibliography ===
- Cabello Rodríguez, María Paz (1983). Barruelo de Santullán: La crisis de un núcleo minero (in Spanish). University of Valladolid. ISBN 978-84-86192-05-1.
- García Reyero, Jaime (2008). Guardo, crónica de una década para la historia (1930-1939) (in Spanish). Cultura & Comunicación. ISBN 978-84-612-7974-6.
