= Quintanilla de las Torres =

Town in Castile and León, Spain

- Town
- Location of Quintanilla de las Torres in Spain.

- Location of Quintanilla de las Torres in the province of Palencia.
- Coordinates: 42°47′44″N 4°12′55″W
- Country: Spain
- Autonomous community: Castile and León
- Province: Palencia
- Municipality: Pomar de Valdivia
- Elevation: 910 m (2,990 ft)

Population (2020)
  - Total: 78
- Time zone: CET
- Postal code: 34811

Quintanilla de las Torres is a town and also a hamlet of the municipality of Pomar de Valdivia in the autonomous community of Castile and León, in the province of Palencia, Spain.

== Geography ==
Nestled in a hollow formed by the groove through which the river Camesa flows, at 910 meters above sea level, 7 km from Pomar, and 5 km from Aguilar de Campoo. On the P-630 regional road with access from the N-611, parallel to the A-67 highway, it has a halt on the Palencia-Santander railroad line, remodeled by Adif.

== History ==
At the fall of the Ancien Régime, the town became a constitutional municipality and in the 1842 census it had 7 households and 36 residents, to later become part of Villarén de Valdivia.

== Demography ==
During the industrial revolution, with the arrival of the Palencia-Santander railroad and its connection from Quintanilla through a branch with Barruelo (to transport coal from the mines), the village grew rapidly to 441 inhabitants. In 2013 it had 81 inhabitants, since the disappearance of the important railroad industry caused the population to leave.

Evolution of the population in the 21st century

demographic vertical bar chart of Quintanilla de las Torres between 2000 and 2020
Population by right (2000–2020) according to the municipal census of the INE

== Tourism ==
In this town is located the Posada de Campoo, a hotel that occupies the old schools and an old building from the 18th century that has been restored.
