= San Cebrián de Mudá =

Coordinates: 42°54′N 4°23′W

- municipality
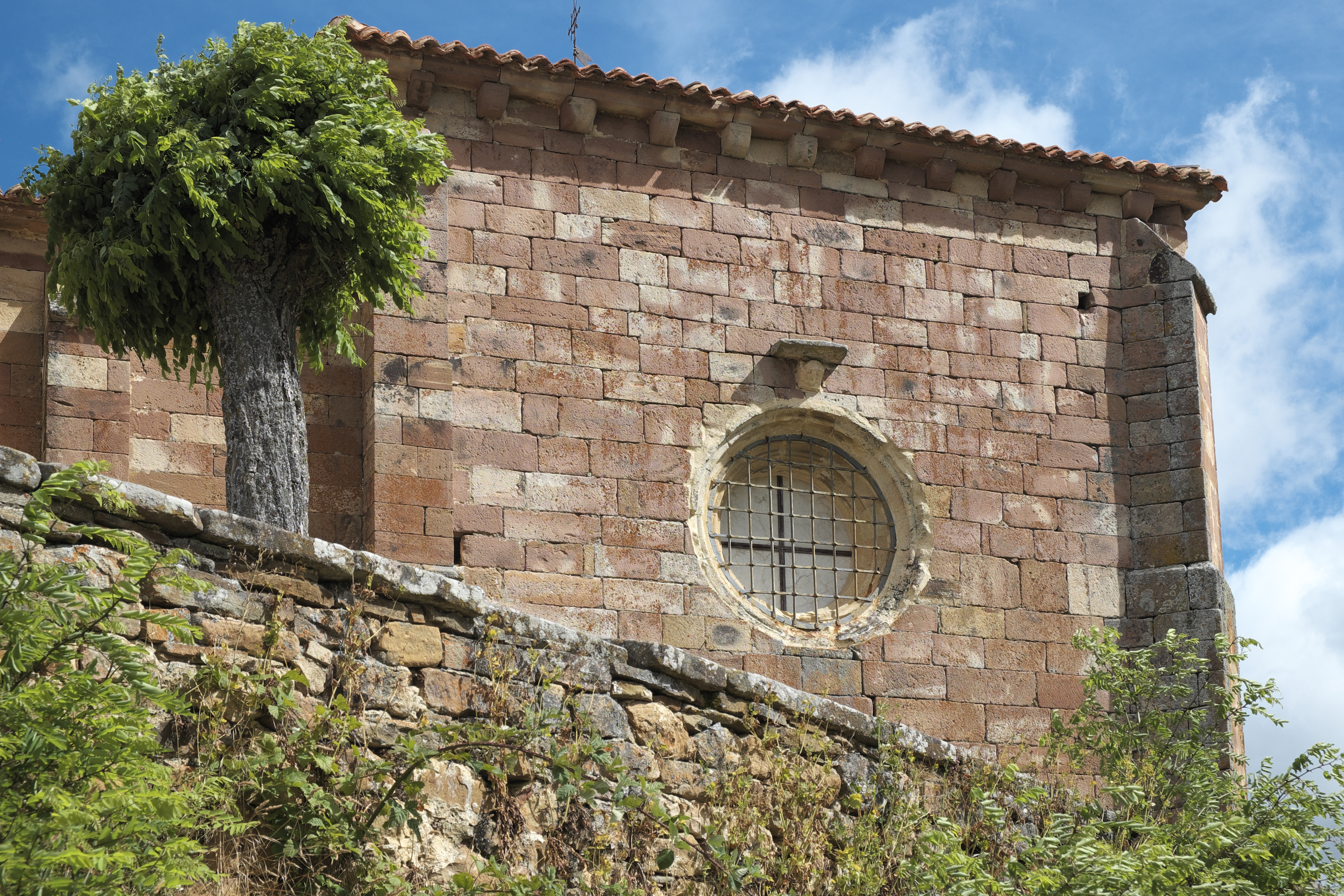
- Interactive map of San Cebrián de Mudá
- Country: Spain
- Autonomous community: Castile and León
- Province: Palencia
- Municipality: San Cebrián de Mudá

Area
  - Total: 44 km^{2} (17 sq mi)

Population (2025-01-01)
  - Total: 142
  - Density: 3.2/km^{2} (8.4/sq mi)
- Time zone: UTC+1 (CET)
  - Summer (DST): UTC+2 (CEST)
- Climate: Cfb
- Website: Official website

San Cebrián de Mudá is a municipality located in the province of Palencia, Castile and León, Spain.

According to the 2004 census (INE), the municipality had a population of 185 inhabitants.

The local economy formerly relied on coal mining and, given the decline of the industry, there have been investments to encourage tourism as an alternative.

== Buildings ==
The church is Romanesque in origin.

== Ecology ==
The landscape has been affected by coal mining, but is now protected as part of the Montaña Palentina Natural Park. There is a centre for European Bison in the municipality.
