= Monument to the Miner (Guardo) =

Monument in Guardo, Spain

Coordinates: 42°47′24″N 4°50′40″W

- Monumento al Minero
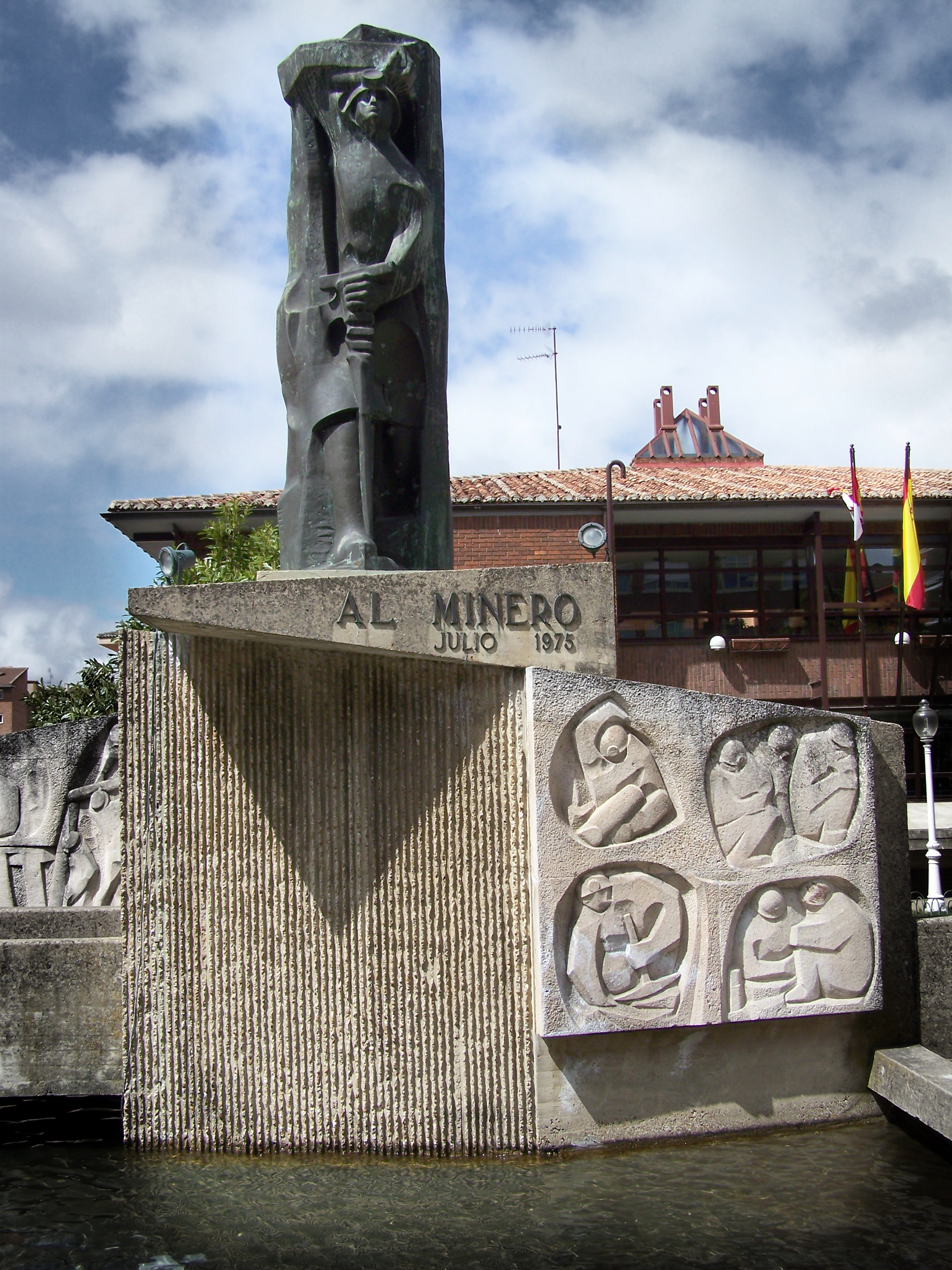
- Interactive map of Monument to the Miner
- Location: Guardo, Spain
- Designer: Jacinto Higueras Cátedra
- Builder: Antonio Espinosa
- Material: Bronze, concrete and stone
- Beginning date: 1974
- Completion date: 1975
- Inauguration date: 1975
- Dedicated to: Miners

The Monument to the Miner (in Spanish: Monumento al Minero) is an architectural complex located in the town of Guardo, in Palencia, Spain. It is a 4 m-high bronze figure erected on a concrete pedestal that represents mining scenes. The complex, which is completed by a pond, was inaugurated in July 1975, and the sculpture is the work of the sculptor Jacinto Higueras Cátedra. It is a tribute to the figure of the miner and is considered the most emblematic monument of the town.

== History ==
In the early 1970s, the town council of Guardo, the most important town in the mining basin of Palencia, approved the construction of a monument to the figure of the miner, one of the most common jobs in the region which, thanks to coal mining, came to be of remarkable prosperity throughout the 20th century. The work was entrusted to the architect Antonio Espinosa. Espinosa commissioned the sculptor Jacinto Higueras Cátedra, a multifaceted creator from a family of great artistic tradition, to create the figure of a miner that would preside over the monument. In 1974, Higueras Cátedra designed the resin sketch of the figure of a miner, which was 4 m high and made of bronze, in the foundry of Ángel Lorca.

The concrete pond was built in 1975, and the stone reliefs with mining scenes that Higueras Cátedra had designed for the base of the figure were mounted. The last step of the work was the placement of the huge figure of the miner, which was done in June 1975.

The monument was inaugurated on July 14, 1975, in a ceremony presided over by Fernando Suárez González, who was Minister of Labor at the time, and the mayor of Guardo, Luis de Felipe. The inauguration was attended by a large number of people from the nearby towns of the Montaña Palentina.

The Monumento al Minero is considered one of the most emblematic places of the town, and it's a place for the celebration of sporting events. In addition, despite the disappearance of mining activity in the area, it is the place where the festivity of Santa Barbara, patron saint of miners, is celebrated every December 4. It consists of a mass in honor of the patron saint followed by a procession that ends at the monument, where a floral offering is made and the attendees sing the mining anthem, “Santa Bárbara bendita”.

== See also ==
- Velilla Power Plant
- Guardo Viaduct
- Ambrosio Ortega
