= Santibáñez de la Peña =

Coordinates: 42°49′N 4°43′W

- municipality
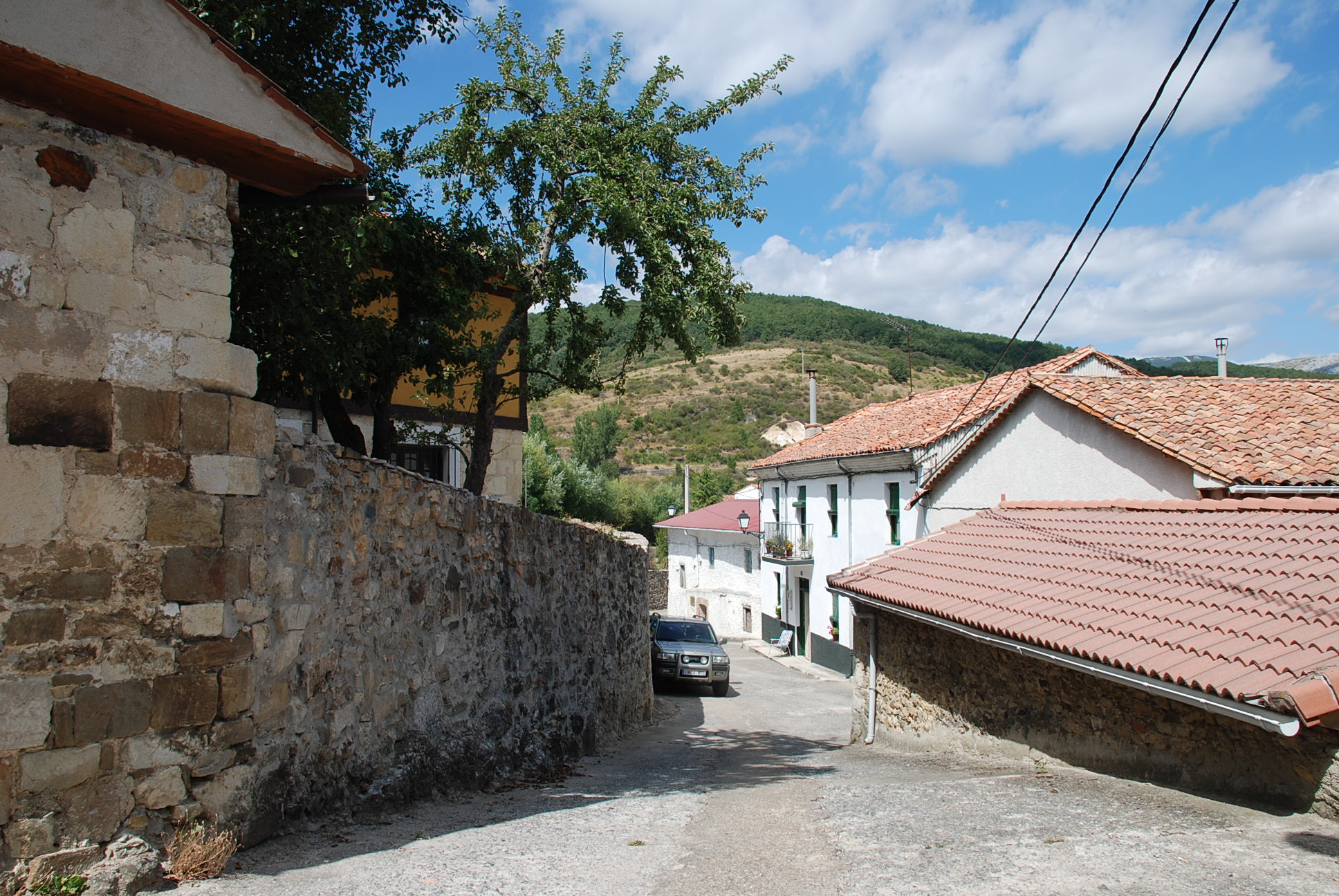

- Flag Coat of arms
- Interactive map of Santibáñez de la Peña
- Country: Spain
- Autonomous community: Castile and León
- Province: Palencia
- Municipality: Santibáñez de la Peña

Area
  - Total: 103 km^{2} (40 sq mi)

Population (2025-01-01)
  - Total: 892
  - Density: 8.66/km^{2} (22.4/sq mi)
- Time zone: UTC+1 (CET)
  - Summer (DST): UTC+2 (CEST)
- Website: Official website

Santibáñez de la Peña is a town and municipality located in the province of Palencia, Castile and León, Spain. Geographically, the centre of town is located on the southern slopes of the Sierra del Brezo. According to the 2018 census (INE), the municipality has a population of 1,044 inhabitants.
