= Respenda de la Peña =

Coordinates: 42°46′N 4°41′W

- municipality
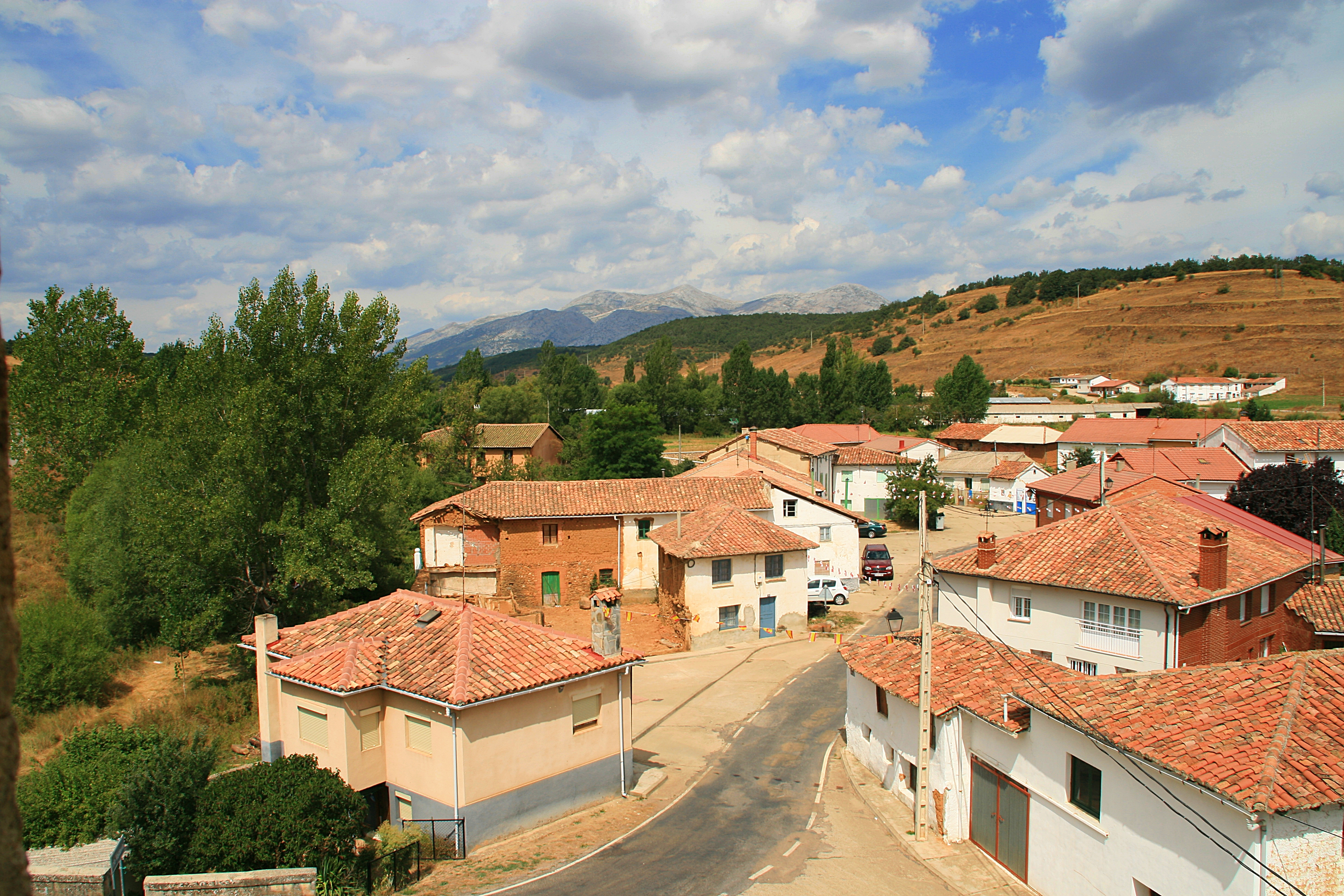
- Interactive map of Respenda de la Peña
- Country: Spain
- Autonomous community: Castile and León
- Province: Palencia
- Municipality: Respenda de la Peña

Area
  - Total: 65.65 km^{2} (25.35 sq mi)
- Elevation: 1,015 m (3,330 ft)

Population (2025-01-01)
  - Total: 140
  - Density: 2.1/km^{2} (5.5/sq mi)
- Time zone: UTC+1 (CET)
  - Summer (DST): UTC+2 (CEST)
- Website: Official website

Respenda de la Peña is a municipality located in the province of Palencia, Castile and León, Spain. According to the 2004 census (INE), the municipality had a population of 228 inhabitants.
