= La Pernía =

- municipality
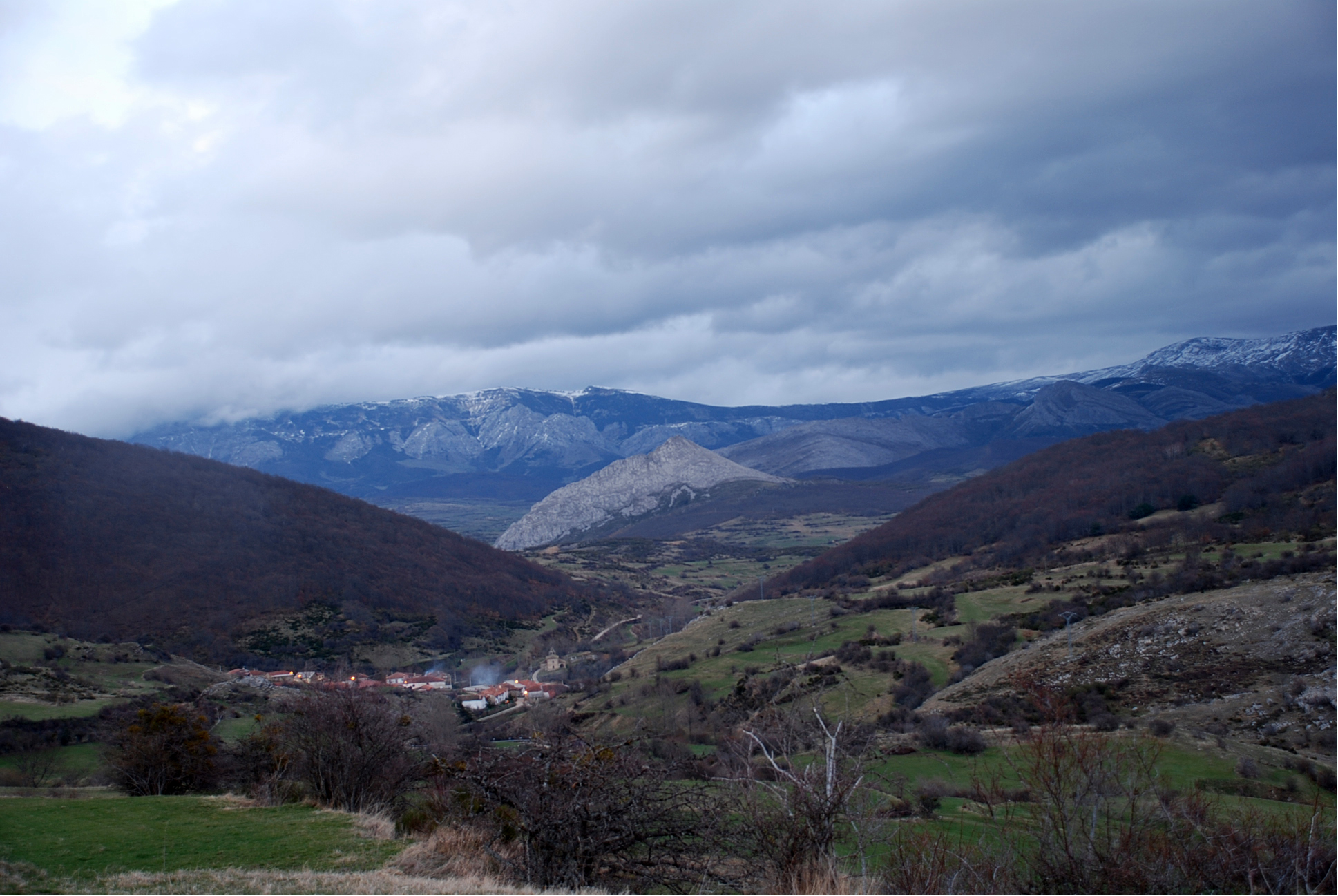

- Location in Spain
- Coordinates: 42°57′45″N 4°29′45″W
- Country: Spain
- Autonomous community: Castile and León
- Province: Palencia
- Municipality: La Pernía

Area
  - Total: 165 km^{2} (64 sq mi)
- Elevation: 1,180 m (3,870 ft)

Population (2025)
  - Total: 297
  - Density: 1.80/km^{2} (4.66/sq mi)
- Time zone: UTC+1 (CET)
  - Summer (DST): UTC+2 (CEST)
- Website: Official website

La Pernía is a municipality located in the province of Palencia, Castile and León, Spain. According to the 2014 census, the municipality has a population of 361 inhabitants.

== Administrative divisions ==
The municipality contains the following localities:

- Areños
- Camasobres
- El Campo
- Casavegas
- Lebanza
- Lores
- Los Llazos
- Piedrasluengas
- San Juan de Redondo
- San Salvador de Cantamuda, municipal capital.
- Santa María de Redondo i
- Tremaya
