= Castrejón de la Peña =

Coordinates: 42°48′N 4°36′W

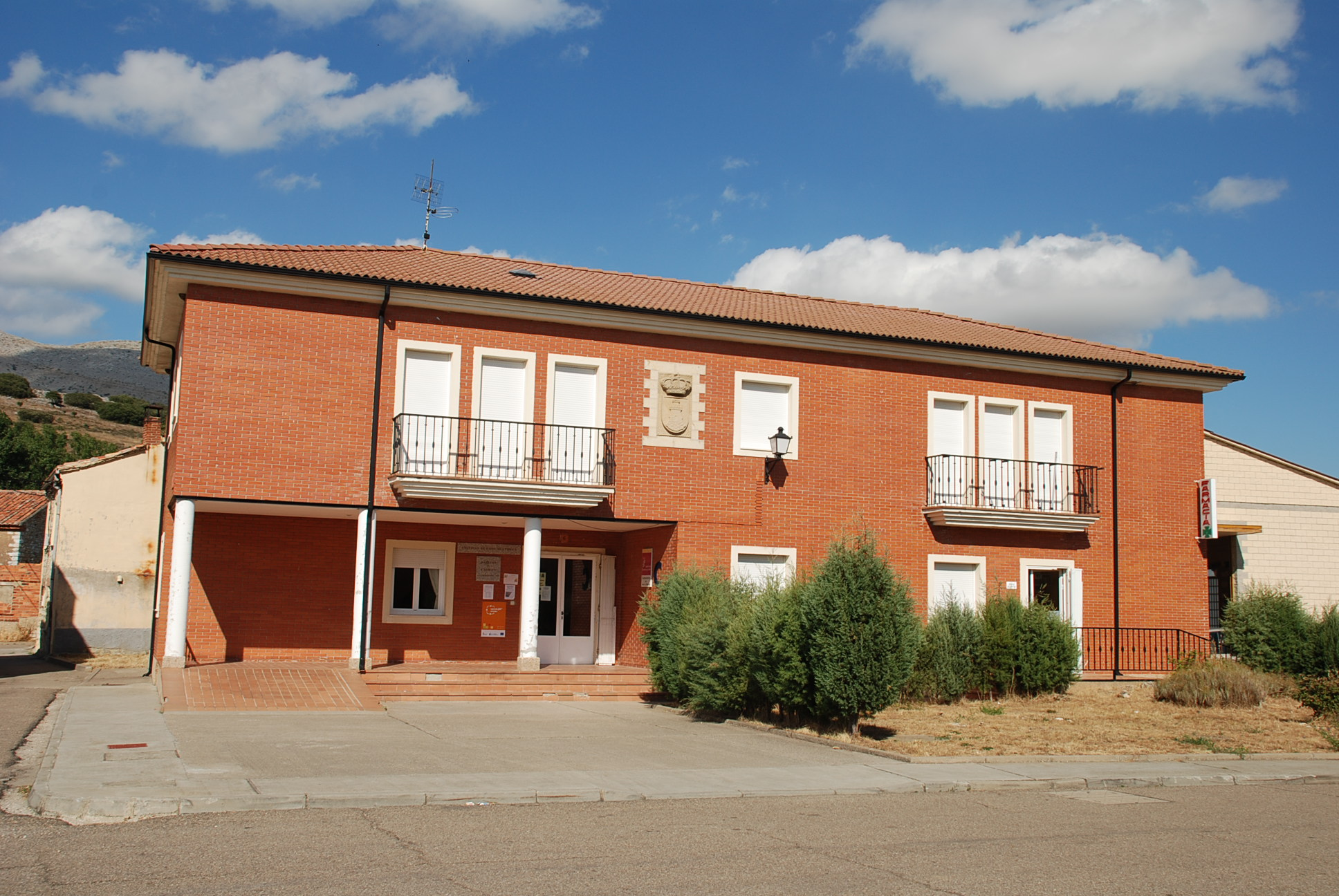

- Coat of arms
- Interactive map of Castrejón de la Peña
- Country: Spain
- Autonomous community: Castile and León
- Province: Palencia
- Municipality: Castrejón de la Peña

Area
  - Total: 106.40 km^{2} (41.08 sq mi)
- Elevation: 1,120 m (3,670 ft)

Population (2025-01-01)
  - Total: 322
  - Density: 3.03/km^{2} (7.84/sq mi)
- Time zone: UTC+1 (CET)
  - Summer (DST): UTC+2 (CEST)
- Website: Official website

Castrejón de la Peña is a municipality located in the province of Palencia, Castile and León, Spain. According to the 2018 census (INE), the municipality had a population of 360 inhabitants.
