= Dehesa de Montejo =

Coordinates: 42°49′N 4°31′W

- municipality
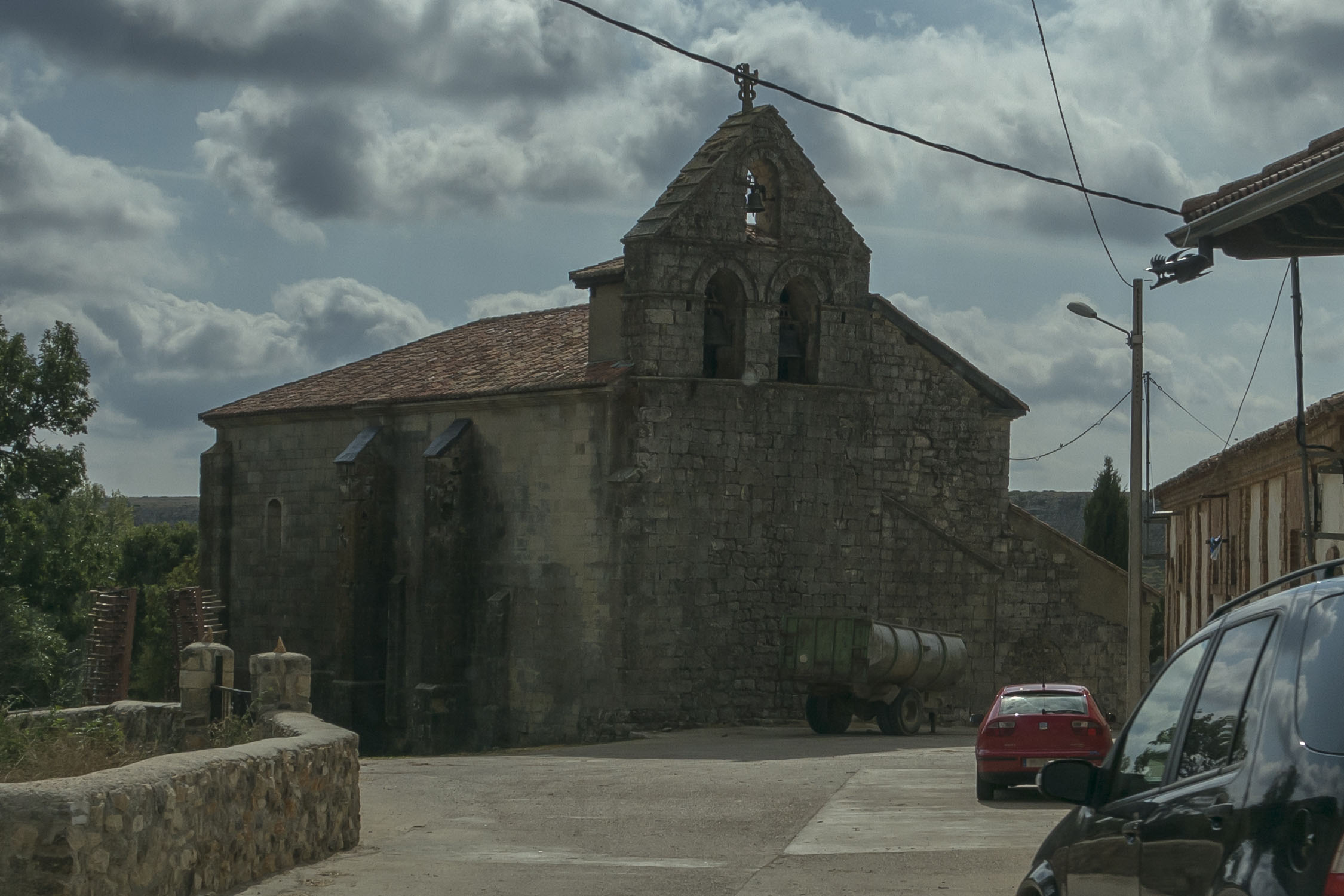

- Coat of arms
- Interactive map of Dehesa de Montejo
- Country: Spain
- Autonomous community: Castile and León
- Province: Palencia
- Municipality: Dehesa de Montejo

Area
  - Total: 43 km^{2} (17 sq mi)

Population (2025-01-01)
  - Total: 130
  - Density: 3.0/km^{2} (7.8/sq mi)
- Time zone: UTC+1 (CET)
  - Summer (DST): UTC+2 (CEST)
- Website: Official website

Dehesa de Montejo is a municipality located in the province of Palencia, Castile and León, Spain. According to the 2004 census (INE), the municipality has a population of 195 inhabitants.

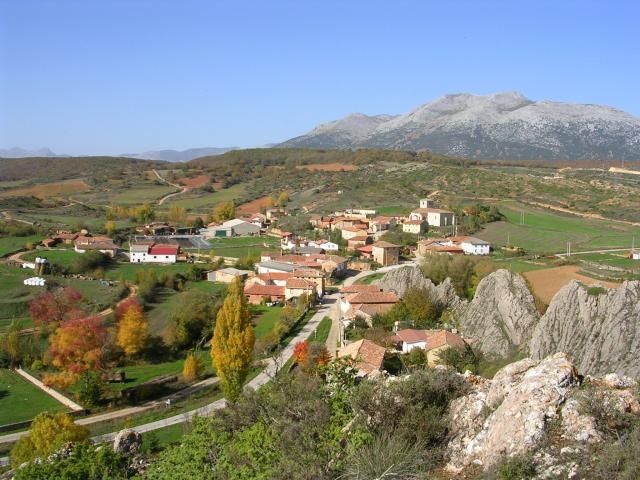
Panoramic view of Colmenares de Ojeda town, in Dehesa de Montejo.
