= La Robla railway =

Narrow-gauge railway in northern Spain connecting La Robla to Bilbao

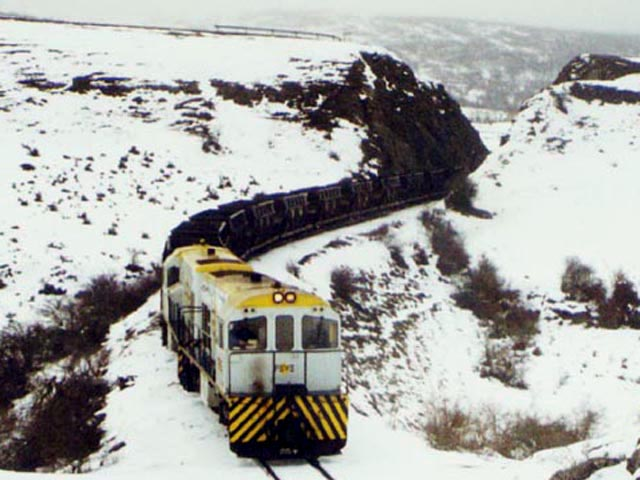
- Two Series 1500 locomotives hauling a coal convoy leaving through the snow of the Navarros cutting, near Mataporquera, in 1998.

Overview
- Native name: Ferrocarril de La Robla
- Status: Active
- Owner: Adif
- Locale: Spain
- Termini: La Robla/León; Bilbao
- Connecting lines: R-4, C-1, C-4, and R-3

Service
- Type: Narrow-gauge railway
- Operator: Renfe

History
- Opened: August 11, 1894
- Closed: 1991 (partial)
- Reopened: March 19, 2003

Technical
- Line length: 335 km (208 mi)
- Track gauge: 1,000 mm (3 ft 3 3/8 in) (metre gauge)
- Electrification: No

The La Robla railway is a narrow-gauge Spanish rail line with a length of 335 km, considered the longest narrow-gauge route in Western Europe, which originally linked La Robla (León) and Bilbao (Biscay).

Its main section, between La Robla and Balmaseda, was inaugurated on 11 August 1894. Its primary objective was to bring the important coal output of the mining basins of León and Palencia closer to consumption in the powerful steel industry of Biscay. The project was promoted and carried out by the Gipuzkoan mining engineer Mariano Zuaznávar, funded by industrialists Enrique Aresti and Victoriano Zabalinchaurreta.

The construction and operating company was the Sociedad del Ferrocarril Hullero de La Robla a Valmaseda, which from 1905 onwards was renamed Ferrocarriles de La Robla. In 1972 the company went into bankruptcy and the public undertaking FEVE took over the line. Under its management, the situation not only failed to improve but worsened dramatically. In 1991, passenger services were suspended — restricted to freight only — but, through various agreements with the public administration, different services between León and Bilbao were resumed in 2003. Since 1 January 2013, the infrastructure has been managed by Adif, while rail services are provided by Renfe or any other operator that chooses to run them, such as Construrail.

Its route crosses the provinces of León, Palencia, Cantabria, Burgos, and Biscay, and owing to its economic and social influence over more than a century it is regarded as one of the most emblematic railways in Spain.

== History ==
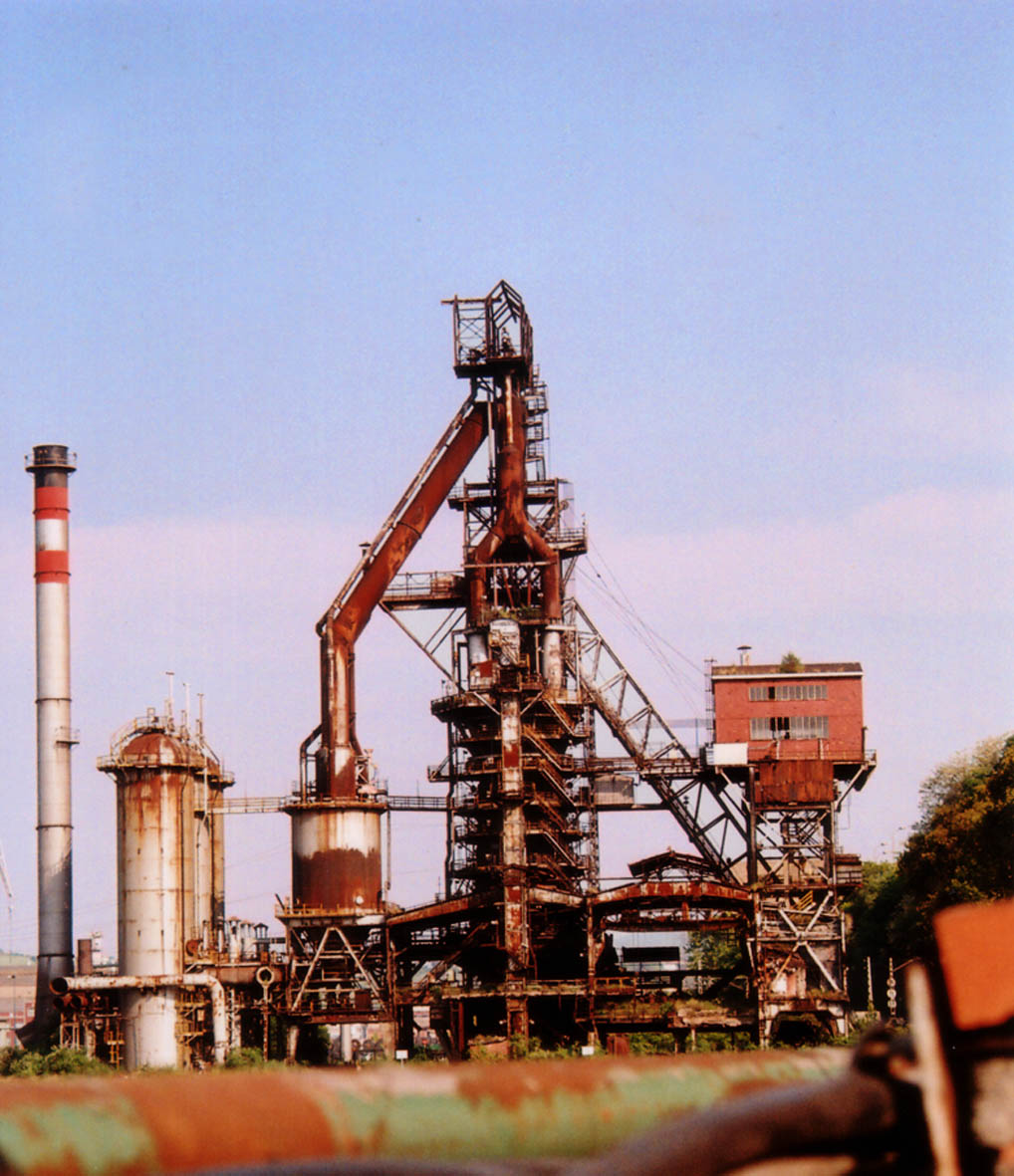
The demand for coal by the important Biscay ferrous industry prompted the construction of the La Robla railway. Shown here are the former facilities of Altos Hornos de Vizcaya.

=== Origin ===
The origin of the La Robla railway project lies in the great importance acquired by the metallurgical industry in the Basque Country towards the end of the 19th century (from 1902, Altos Hornos de Vizcaya), and its considerable impact on the industrial development of northern Spain. The main problem for this industry was the high cost of transporting the coal needed to produce the coke used to fuel the smelting furnaces, since it is the only major steelworks in the world not located in a coalfield — given that its fuel needs, in this case coal, are estimated at between 3 and 5 times the weight of iron ore. This fact meant that the percentage contribution of fuel to the cost of producing pig iron in Biscay was double or even triple what it represented in other steel-producing regions such as Pittsburgh, Loire, or Westphalia. The fossil fuel reached the Biscay ports by sea, from Asturias and England, in the same ships that exported iron ore. This greatly limited the development of the steel industry, making the import of coal at competitive prices dependent on the export of iron.

The sharp rise in the price of English coal between 1889 and 1890 led powerful Basque steel capital to seek alternatives in the coal fields of León and Palencia. It was then that the need arose for an efficient and economical means of transport to link the emerging Basque steelworks with the isolated mining basins. The chosen solution was the railway, which after the Industrial Revolution had become the most advantageous form of land transport.

=== Project ===
Several projects to solve this communications problem were put forward in the final years of the 19th century. After studying possible alternatives, the definitive project, the work of the prestigious Gipuzkoan mining engineer Mariano Zuaznávar, was presented to the Cortes on 26 November 1889. Zuaznávar (1841–1916), with wide experience in mining operations, convinced Bilbao's business community (Ustara, Gandarias, Ampuero, López de Lerena, Echevarría, Epalza, etc.) of the economic interest of investing in the project.

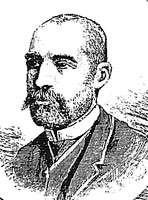
A contemporary engraving of Mariano Zuaznávar, the true promoter and executor of the La Robla railway project.

Although two variants were initially studied (one of them in Iberian gauge), the final choice was to build the route in narrow gauge to reduce costs, representing a saving of 60% compared with the standard gauge. The initial budget was 16 million pesetas. Eight million pesetas were issued in shares and 8 million pesetas in bonds redeemable at 6%.

In January 1890, the Congress of Deputies and the Senate officially granted Zuaznávar management of the railway line and legal authorisation to undertake the construction of:

...construction and operation of a railway line that, departing from La Robla, on the Asturias, Galicia and León line, terminates at Valmaseda, as well as the construction of new branch lines and extension of the line should it be deemed appropriate.

The construction contract was signed on 17 April 1890 with contractors José María de Yriondo and Juan José Cobeaga, and on 28 April, Enrique de Aresti y de la Torre and Victoriano Zabalinchaurreta created, together with twelve other investors, the Sociedad del Ferrocarril Hullero de La Robla a Valmaseda S.A. (which from 1905 onwards was renamed Ferrocarriles de La Robla S.A.), with the intention of laying a narrow-gauge line to transport coal from the Leonese and Palentine mining basins to Bilbao, to meet the demand of the powerful ferrous industry of Biscay. Its president was Cirilo María de Ustara and Zuaznávar the managing director. The prominence of Basque investors and the coincidence of ownership of the mining operations and the railway initially turned the project into a monopoly, which did not please many people. In this way, La Robla was one of the first railways in Spain built with Spanish capital.

=== Construction ===
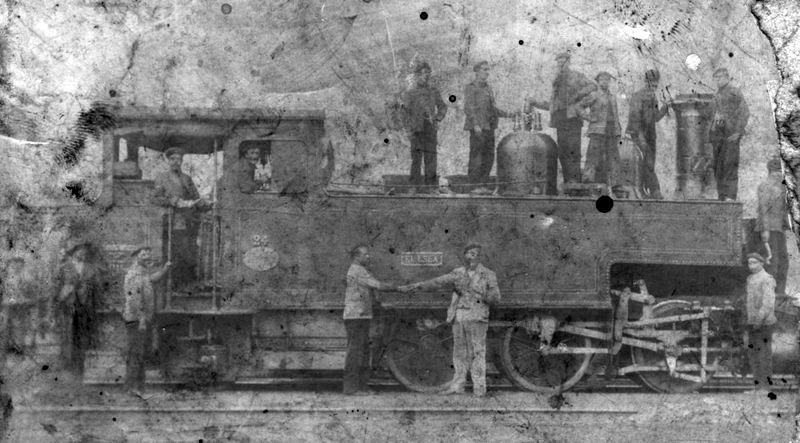
Locomotive 031-T no. 24, "El Esla", near Cistierna, photographed in 1900.

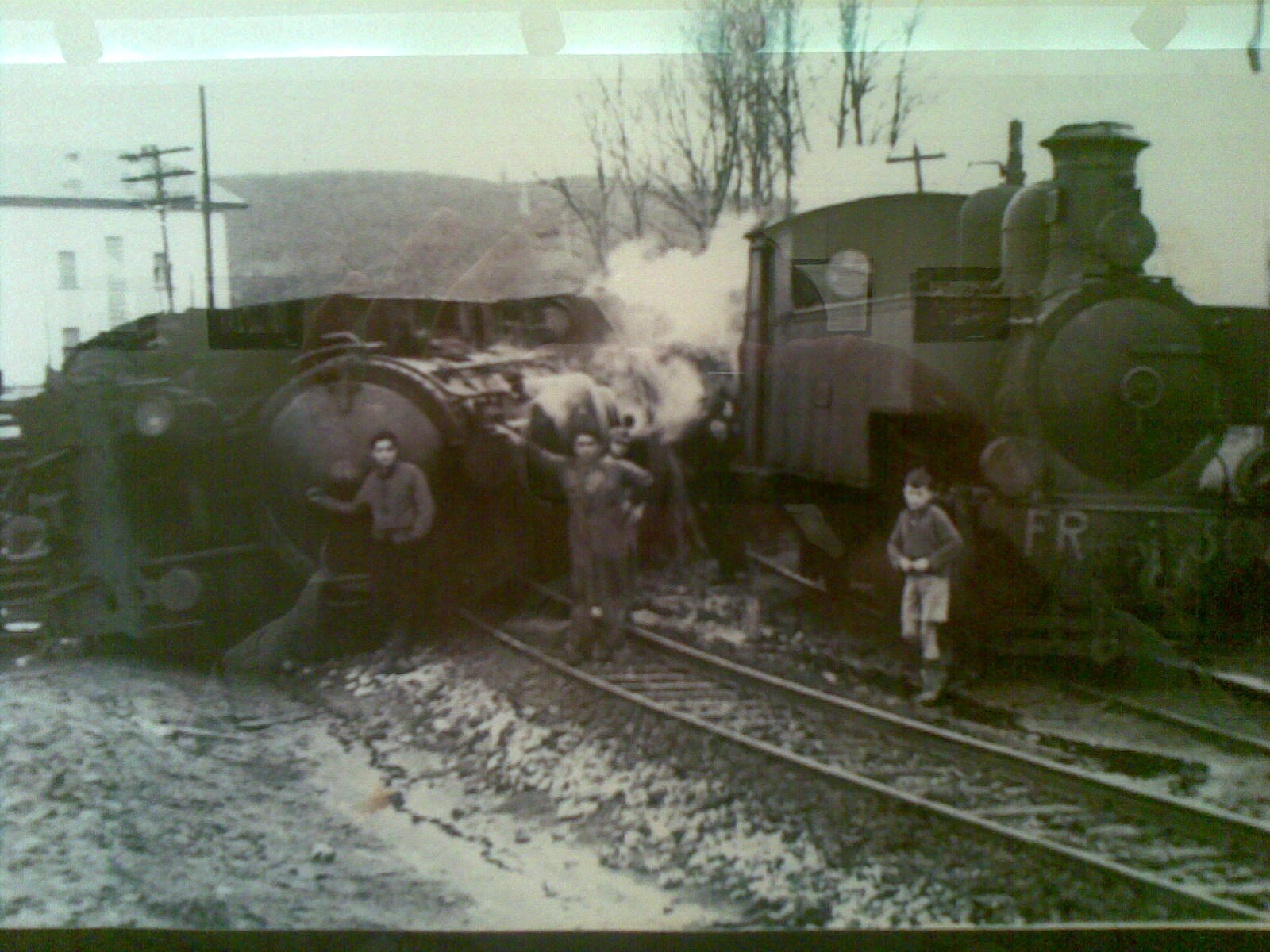
A derailed locomotive near Guardo station, in a photograph from the 1940s.

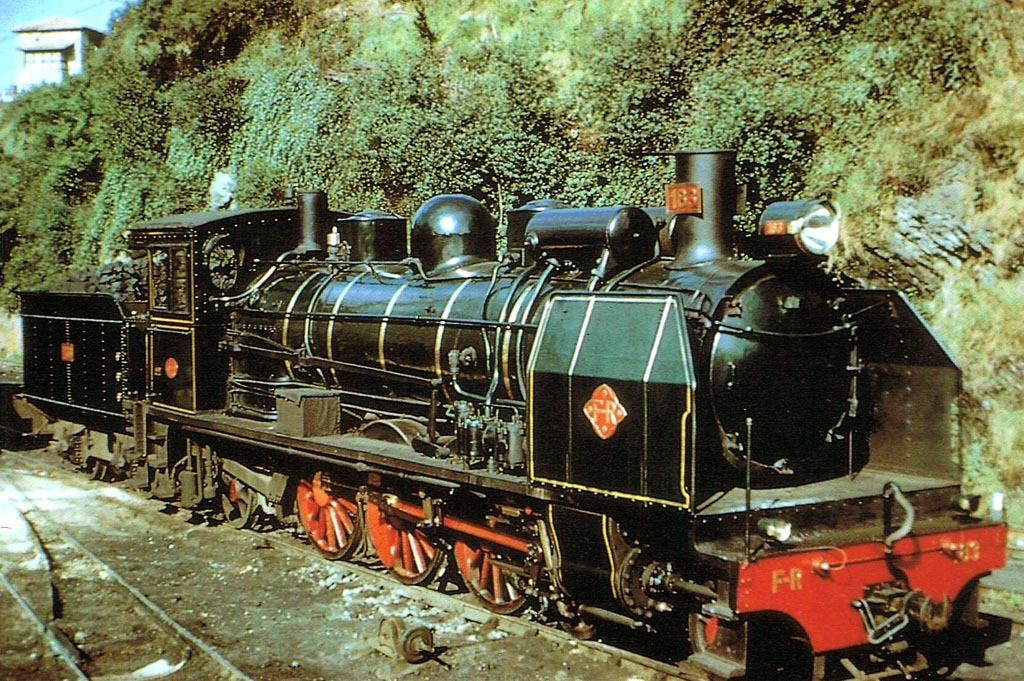
A Tunisian locomotive of the La Robla railway at Balmaseda station in the 1960s.

Throughout 1890, surveying and ground studies were carried out, with the final route design entrusted to José Manuel Oraá Aizquibel, in which Ignacio de Rotaeche, who was managing director of the company between 1918 and 1922, also played an important role. For its construction, 13,000 tonnes of rails were ordered from Altos Hornos y Fábricas de Hierro y Aceros de Bilbao. The works were carried out with great speed. On 6 October 1892 — in barely two years — the first section was inaugurated, between Balmaseda and Espinosa de los Monteros, covering 45 km and overcoming one of the greatest changes in elevation along the route. The main section of the line (Valmaseda–La Robla) was inaugurated in 1894, barely four years after work began.

Costs

The main infrastructure — land, earthworks, tunnels, and bridges — cost around 10,000,000 pesetas. The superstructure — buildings, track, workshops, and fittings — somewhat more than 7,000,000, and the rolling stock — locomotives, coaches, and wagons — around 2,000,000, so that the total cost of the railway came to approximately 20,000,000 pesetas.

Opening

The inauguration ceremony was held on 11 August 1894 at an intermediate point on the line, Los Carabeos station in Cantabria, where a convoy arrived from each end of the route and civil, military, and religious authorities from the affected provinces gathered. On 24 September, traffic opened along the entire route. The main project was complete, since the transport from Valmaseda to Bilbao was to be handled by the Ferrocarril del Cadagua, with which the Sociedad del Ferrocarril Hullero had reached a cooperation agreement; but differences between the two companies led La Robla to decide to extend its line to the Biscay capital, though at first it only reached as far as Aranguren. In 1898, the Santander–Bilbao Railway was formed following the merger of the Ferrocarril del Cadagua with other railways. In 1902, the Valmaseda–Luchana/Bilbao section was opened (using the Santander–Bilbao Railway's route to access Bilbao). Finally, in 1911, the new section between Araguren and Iráuregui (on the other side of the Cadagua River) was completed to avoid sharing track with the Santander–Bilbao Railway due to differences between the companies. In 1923, the auxiliary branch León–Matallana was completed, establishing the direct Bilbao–León service. As a reminder of its coal-mining origins, a large coal washery belonging to Hullera Vasco-Leonesa still stands at La Robla.

Timeline

Dates on which the various sections entered service:

Date	Section	Length (km)
6 October 1892	Valmaseda–Espinosa	45.0
12 November 1892	La Robla–Boñar	31.0
20 July 1893	Espinosa–Sotoscueva	13.0
20 July 1893	Boñar–Cistierna	24.0
14 September 1894	Cistierna–Sotoscueva	171.0
1 December 1902	Valmaseda–Luchana	29
31 May 1923	León–Matallana	29.0

=== Operation ===
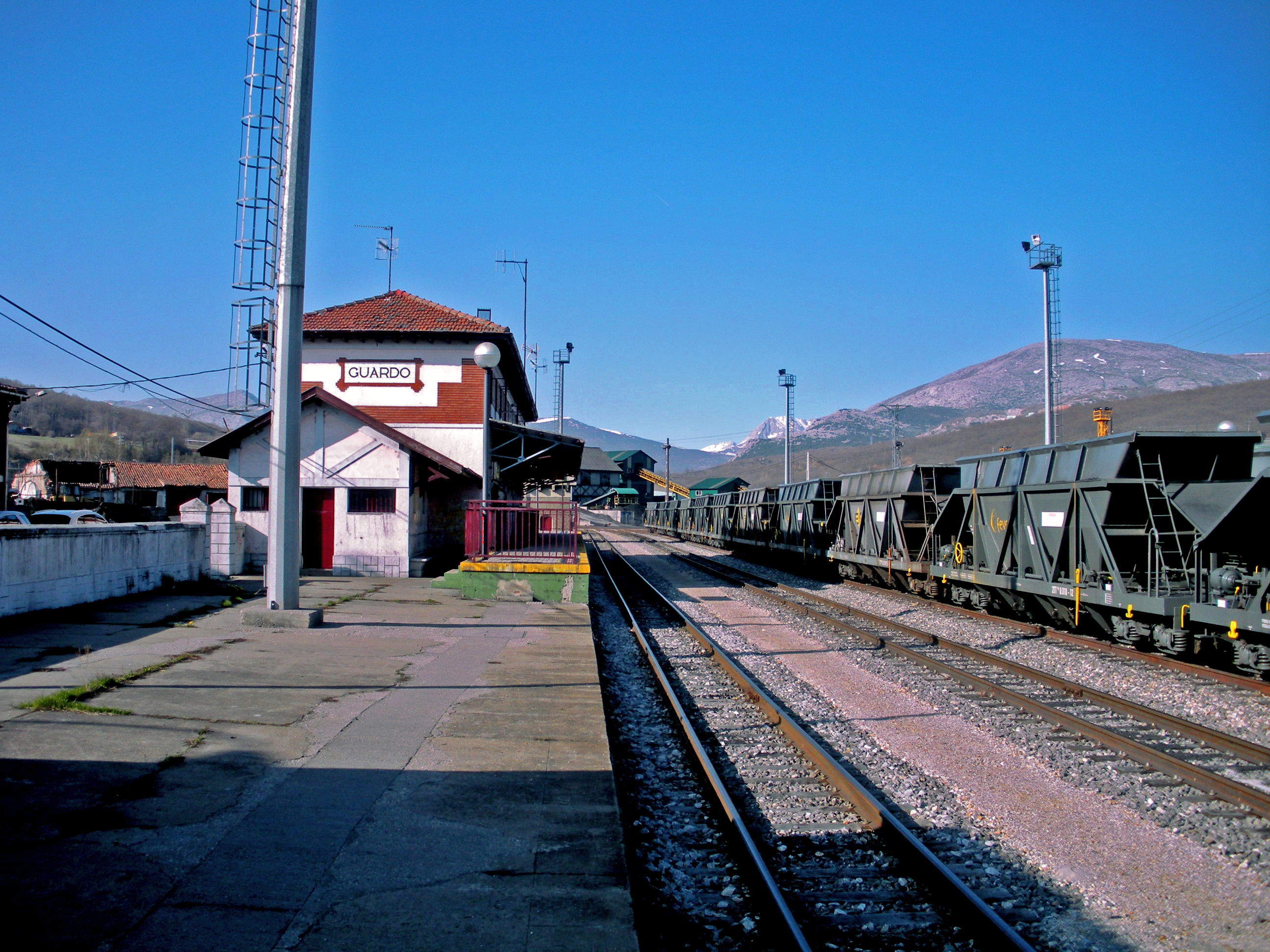
Guardo station, with the coal train on its tracks.

The first steam locomotives to run on the line were 6 of the 0-3-1 T model (0-6-2 according to Whyte notation) built by the Société Franco-Belge de La Croyère, named "León", "Palencia", "Guipúzcoa", "Burgos", "Vizcaya", and "Santander". Its main locomotive fleet, first steam and then diesel, was based at Valmaseda, with workshops at La Robla and Mataporquera.

The hullero (coal train), as it was colloquially known, revitalised the economy of the mining basins of northern León and Palencia. Towns such as Cistierna and Guardo became important industrial centres, and their development reached levels never seen in modern history. In addition, the route's connections with Iberian gauge stations at La Robla and Mataporquera facilitated cooperation in traffic between the two gauges.

The amount of coal transported by the hullero in its early years of operation was as follows:

Year	1895	1897	1899	1901	1903	1905	1907	1909	1911	1913
Tonnes	17,378	48,906	107,413	163,381	135,811	128,694	189,248	140,556	163,552	223,629

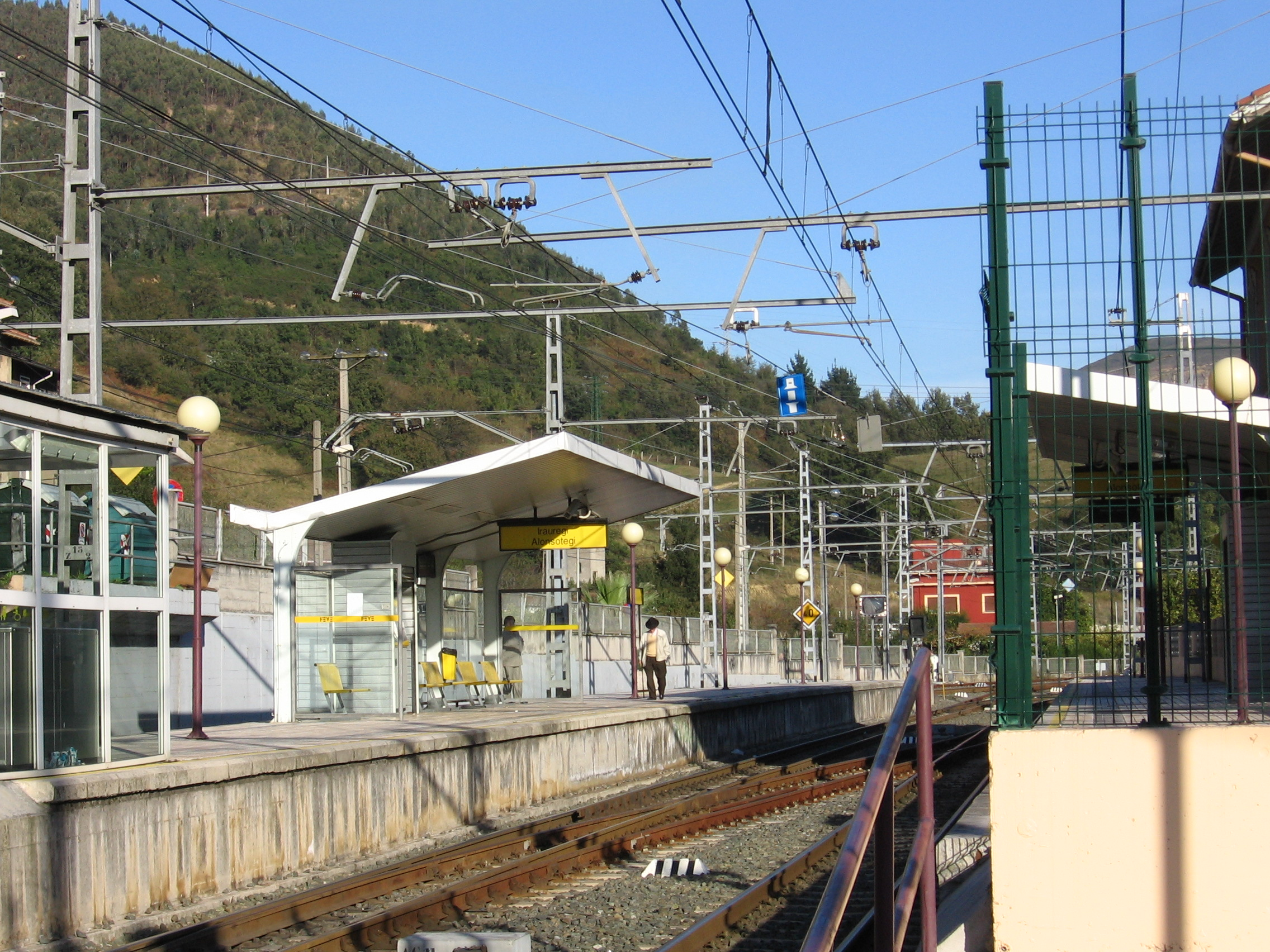
The FEVE station at Alonsotegi (Iráuregui).

The early years were difficult, since as can be seen from the table, demand was modest (200,000 t transported was not reached until 1912), and the company remained in a very precarious situation between 1896 and 1905. In May of that year the company changed its name to Ferrocarriles de La Robla, S.A., and Mariano Zuaznávar renounced all his rights as founder of the company. Demand grew from 1910 onwards, and important mining centres developed in areas such as Sabero and Matallana, in the province of León, where new and important mining companies were formed. Production tripled in some areas. Population growth in the areas mentioned was extremely high. In 1916, the company achieved the best economic result in its history, with revenues of 4,117,269.94 pesetas. Furthermore, in 1918 it reached half a million tonnes transported.

The Spanish Civil War (1936–1939) caused a major setback in the railway's history: the mining basins were brought to a standstill, the train was used for military purposes by both sides, and serious damage was inflicted on the infrastructure. Passenger services resumed on 27 August 1937, after a year's suspension.

From the 1930s, the La Robla railway had a connection with the Iberian gauge Santander–Mediterranean Railway via Cidad-Dosante station. Through this terminal station, opened in 1930, passengers could change trains, since La Robla trains ran in parallel.

In 1949, the construction of the Ebro Reservoir necessitated building a diversion, thus eliminating the longest straight section of the route, which extended for more than 6 km.

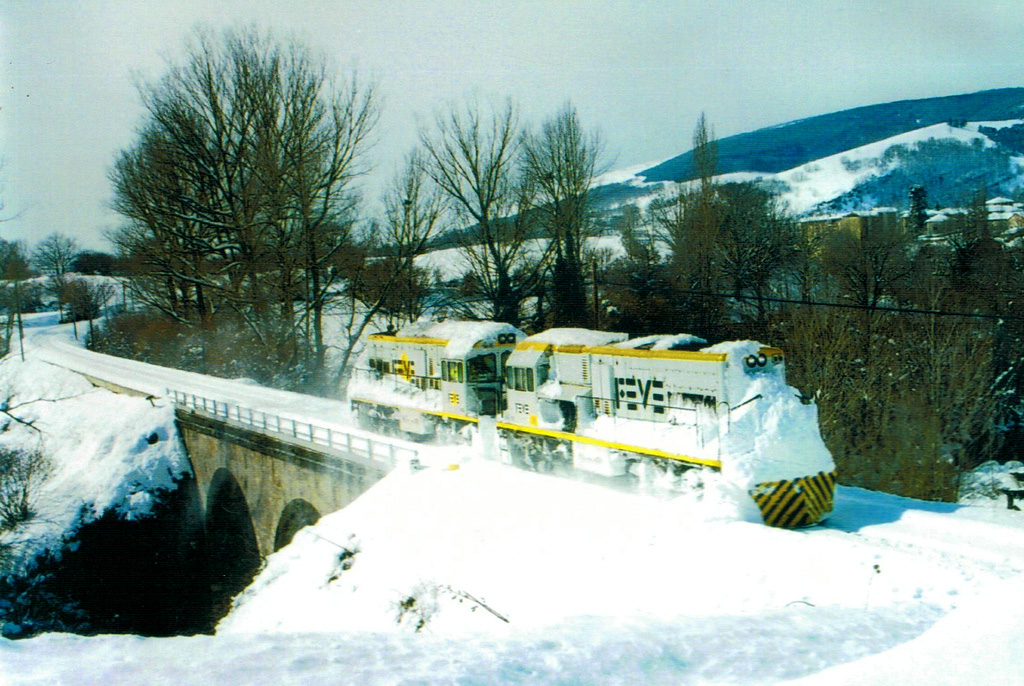
Two GECO Series 1500 of FEVE crossing the Trueba River at Espinosa de los Monteros.

In 1958, the railway reached its record for coal transported, with 908,464 tonnes, though this figure was only the starting point of its ultimate decline. That year, the acquisition of its first diesel locomotives was approved: 7 Alstom Series 1000 models.

In 1964, the Ten-Year Modernisation Plan was approved, with the aim of making the railway economically viable. The company then acquired 10 GECo diesel locomotives, which it called the Series 1500, from General Electric, and permanently replaced steam traction. The La Robla company could not cope with this plan and began making losses from 1968. The principal causes cited for its bankruptcy include rising personnel costs, deteriorating fixed and rolling infrastructure, growing competition from road transport, and the coal crisis of the late 1950s. The public undertaking FEVE took over operation of the line in 1972.

From 1980, FEVE undertook a modernisation process for its rolling stock, incorporating Series 1600 and 1650 locomotives, Series 2400 railcars, Series 5300 passenger coaches, Series 2TT hopper wagons, Series 2SS flatcars, and Series 2JJ box wagons.

Decline and unviability

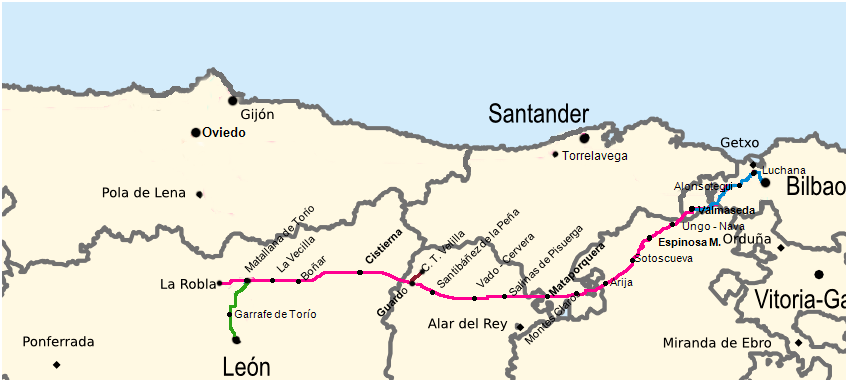
Map of the La Robla railway route: Pink: Main route, inaugurated in 1894. Blue: Balmaseda – Bilbao/Luchana branch, inaugurated in 1902. Green: León – Matallana de Torío branch, inaugurated in 1923. Dark red: Guardo – Velilla power station branch, inaugurated in 1984.

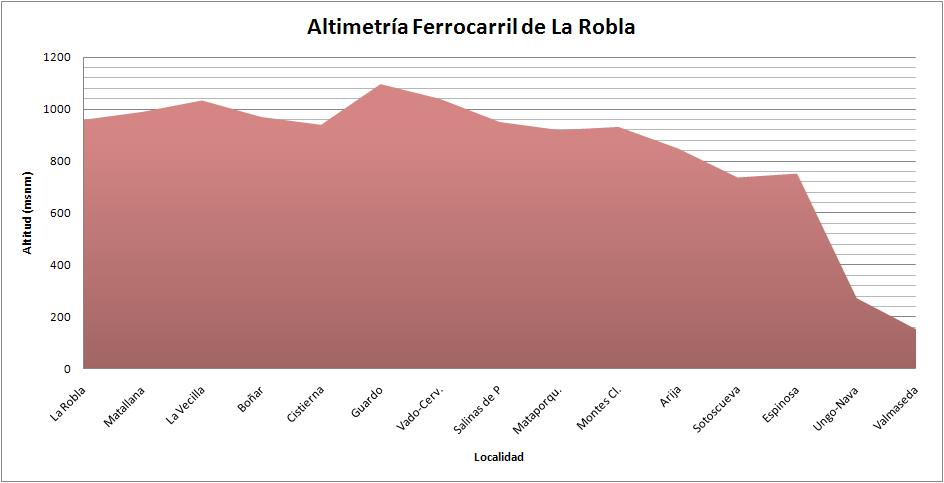
Elevation profile of the railway route, from La Robla to Valmaseda. The significant changes in elevation can be seen, from the mining basins down to nearly sea level, reached at Bilbao.

From 1983, the line was boosted by its use by the tourist train Transcantábrico, a luxury service that was Spain's first tourist hotel train. A branch was also added near Guardo connecting with the Velilla power station for the supply of coal to it.

But performance continued to fall, and in 1990 the line reached an operating deficit of 387 million pesetas, while freight traffic had also declined enormously. As a result, in December 1991, the Ministry of Public Works and Town Planning decreed the suspension of passenger services between Guardo and Valmaseda, citing safety reasons, leaving the central section of the line virtually abandoned. At the time, the journey between León and Bilbao took 12 hours to complete.

The measure was very unpopular in the areas affected by the suspension of the line, and both local councils and various associations and coordinating bodies took action to secure the restoration of the line, achieving in 1993 an agreement with the Ministry of Public Works, Transport and the Environment, the Junta of Castile and León, FEVE, and the trade unions, which invalidated the earlier decree and replaced it with a plan for gradual reopening. Thus, in November 1993 the Matallana–Cistierna section was reopened, and in 1995 the Cistierna–Guardo section.

Reopening

On 19 March 2003, following an agreement between FEVE and the Junta of Castile and León, the León–Bilbao service was reinstated as a regional passenger train service (line R-4), while the La Robla–Matallana and Iráuregui–Luchana sections continued to be used exclusively for freight transport. The journey time was reduced to 7 and a half hours. The Ministry of Development also participated in this agreement, which entailed an investment of 64 million euros for the improvement of the routes and the modernisation of the rolling stock. This regional service is popularly known as the Correo de la Robla. The Transcantábrico also resumed operations, with a major investment in the modernisation and maintenance of the line.

In 2006, the FEVE station at La Robla suffered a fire, and its roof was destroyed. In 2007 it was rebuilt and adapted as a pilgrims' hostel for the Ruta de San Salvador section of the Camino de Santiago, a variant of the Jacobean route linking León with Oviedo. Also in 2006, and thanks to an agreement with the Diputación de León, new halts were built in the city of León (San Mamés and Universidad) and at Cerezal de la Guzpeña.

Its freight service received a notable boost from February 2008, when, through an agreement between FEVE and Renfe, the latter took over the transport of imported coal in Iberian gauge from the port of El Musel, in Gijón, to La Robla station, from where, after transhipment, it is sent by narrow gauge to the Iberdrola thermal power station at Velilla del Río Carrión. This agreement marked the start of a daily transport operation of a 600-tonne convoy to the Palentine facility.

In February 2009, Ángel Villalba, the new president of the company, presented the Expreso de La Robla, a tourist train similar to the Transcantábrico which, from September, began operating the León–Bilbao route with sections for teaching, meetings, and study, and another for student accommodation, with the aim of visiting the tourist and cultural attractions along the route for educational purposes.

Since 1 January 2013, the infrastructure has been managed by Adif, while passenger rail services are provided by Renfe.

== Transport ==
=== Freight transport ===
Carbonero (coal train)

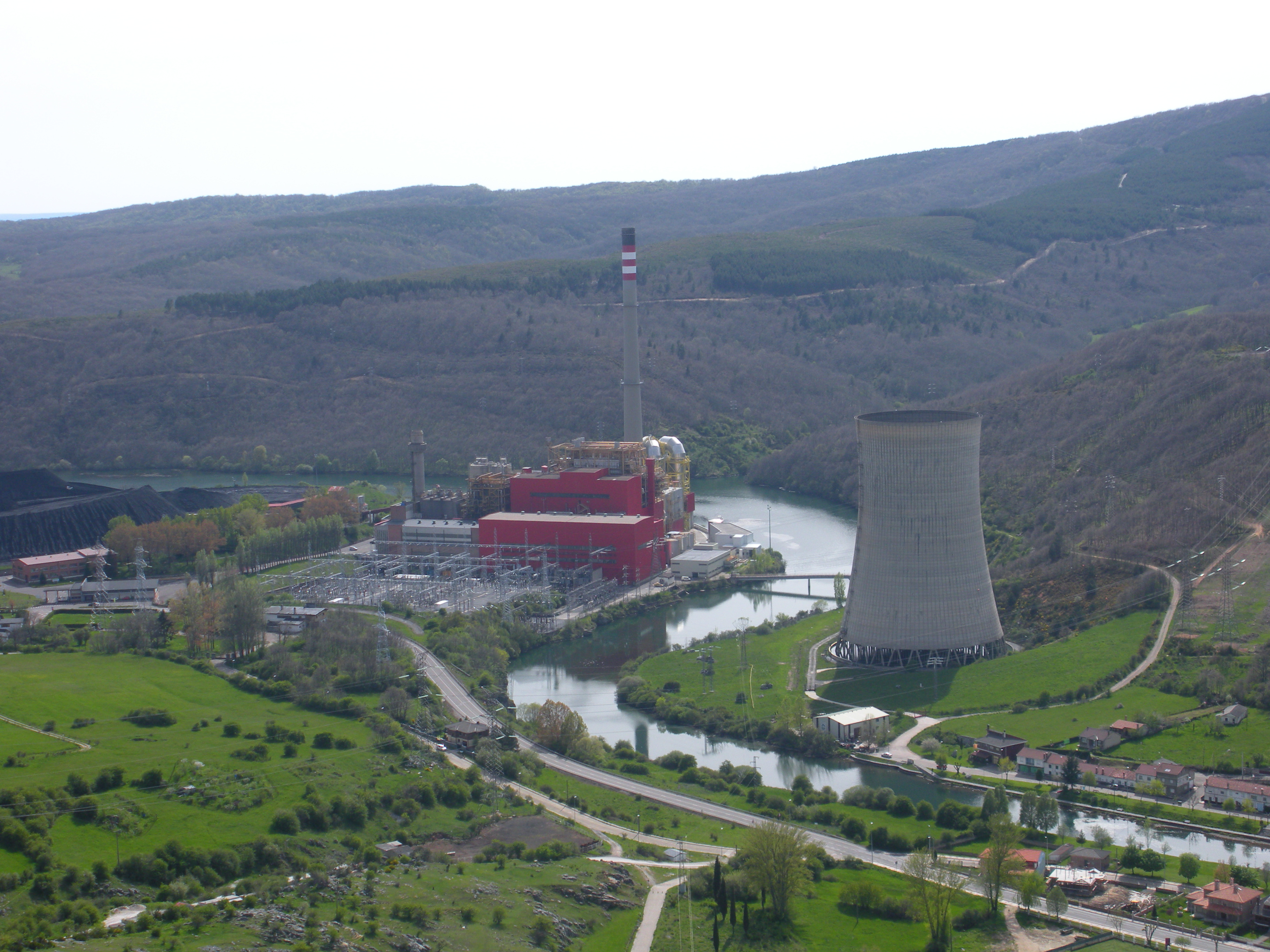
View of the Velilla power station, reached from Guardo by a direct 2.5 km branch of the La Robla railway for the coal supply to its two generating units.

Despite the line's original purpose of carrying large quantities of coal from the Leonese and Palentine basins to the Biscay steel industry, market needs changed this trend. As explained above, this traffic grew until it peaked at 908,464 t in 1958. By 1966, coal transport had fallen by 30%, and this trend became irreversible. The search for more cost-effective alternatives to feed the blast furnaces, industrial restructuring and the dismantling of many of them, and the decline of mining all led to the disappearance of this traffic. Coal transport was maintained through the delivery of convoys of imported coal to the thermal power station at Velilla del Río Carrión, brought from the Santander and Gijón ports. This led FEVE to build a 2.5 km branch from Guardo delivering the mineral directly to the plant, owned by Iberdrola.

The arenero (sand train)

The transport of silica sand from the quarries at Arija has also been of great importance, and is known as the arenero. The extraction of silica sand in this Burgos locality has been carried out throughout the 20th century, first at the old quarries of Cristalería Española and later at the Ebro Reservoir itself. This operation, currently owned by the company SIBELCO, accounts, with 800,000 t/year, for one sixth of national production.

For its transport, the line has a loading facility next to the reservoir and sand-washing plants. The destinations to which FEVE transports silica sand are Ariz and Luchana, in Biscay, and Gama in Cantabria.

Other traffic

Throughout its history, the line has also served, to a lesser extent, the supply and distribution of other businesses, some now gone, such as the cement works and La Robla power station, the sugar factory at Boñar, the cement works at Mataporquera, the glassworks at Arija, the power station at Valmaseda, and the Papelera Española paper mill at Aranguren.

=== Passenger transport ===
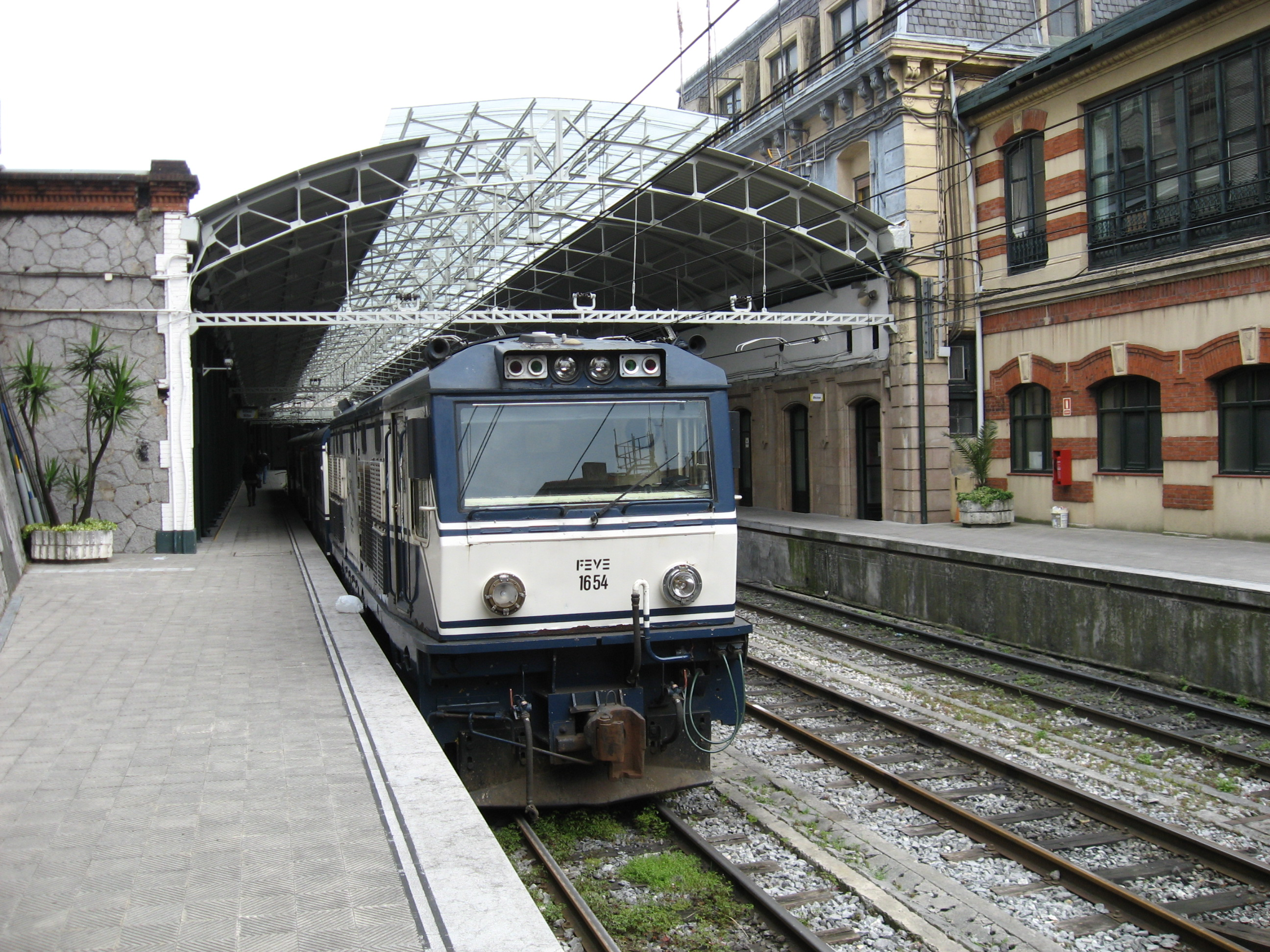
The Bilbao–León train at Bilbao-Concordia station, in the old FEVE livery, hauled by a Series 1600.

Its social influence was also very significant: it was the habitual means of transport for migrants from rural areas moving to the industrialised city of Bilbao, and conversely, for seasonal Biscay tourism heading to the Merindades area of Burgos.

Unlike other mining railways, passenger traffic on the La Robla train was very significant, as the freight traffic on this railway ran almost exclusively in one direction. Its use peaked in 1948, reaching 1,450,984 passengers. Its gradual decline became more pronounced from the 1980s until its closure in 1991. Despite its reopening, the transfer of management of narrow-gauge railways to the autonomous communities and their progressive use as commuter services in the León and Bilbao areas created new concerns about the line's future.

This problem has been partially addressed by the introduction of tourist trains such as the Expreso de La Robla, which, combined with the Transcantábrico, guarantees tourist and educational passenger use of the line.

== Rolling stock ==
Lacking overhead wires, the La Robla line has used two types of traction throughout its history: steam and diesel.

=== Steam locomotives ===
Since its inauguration in 1894, the list of steam locomotives with which the railway has operated is as follows:

Type	No. and name	Manufacturer	Works no.	Year	Notes
031 T	1 "León"; 2 "Palencia"	Franco-Belge, La Croyère	795–796	1891	
031 T	3 "Guipúzcoa"; 4 "Burgos"	Franco-Belge, La Croyère	797–798	1892	No. 3 sold to Hulleras de Sabero y Anexas S.A., Vega Mediana, in 1966
031 T	5 "Vizcaya"; 6 "Santander"	Franco-Belge, La Croyère	799–800	1892	No. 5 rebuilt at Valmaseda workshops in 1912. No. 6 rebuilt as 032 T at Valmaseda workshops in 1920
131 T	11 "Matallana"; 12 "Sabero"; 13 "Valderrueda"; 14 "Guardo"; 15 "Cervera"	Sharp-Stewart, Manchester	4016–4020	1894	
131 T	16 "A. de Gandarias"; 17 "Alfredo Ustara"; 18 "C. de Vildosola"; 19 "Pedro Ortiz Arana"; 20 "Juan C. Calvo"	Linke-Hofmann, Breslau	2774–2778	1923	No. 19 reconstructed by Babcock & Wilcox in 1947
031 T	21 "El Bernesga"; 22 "El Torío"; 23 "El Porma"	John Cockerill, Seraing	1664–1666	1892	
031 T	24 "El Esla"	John Cockerill, Seraing	1667	1892	Reconstructed by Valmaseda workshops in 1907
031 T	25 "El Cea"; 26 "El Carrión"	John Cockerill, Seraing	1668–1669	1892	Reconstructed by Valmaseda workshops in 1917
031 T	27 "El Pisuerga"; 28 "El Ebro"	John Cockerill, Seraing	1670–1671	1892	No. 28 reconstructed by Valmaseda workshops in 1916
031 T	29 "El Nela"	John Cockerill, Seraing	1672	1892	Reconstructed as 040 T by Valmaseda workshops in 1931
031 T	30 "El Engaña"; 31 "El Trueba"; 32 "El Cadagua"	John Cockerill, Seraing	1673–1675	1892	Reconstructed by Valmaseda workshops 1917 to 1919
140	41 "Mena"; 42 "Montija"; 43 "Sotoscueva"; 44 "Valdeporres"; 45 "Campoo"; 46 "Valdeolea"	Baldwin Locomotive Works, Philadelphia	15978–15983	1898	
140	47 "Bilbao"; 48 "La Robla"	Baldwin Locomotive Works, Philadelphia	18451–18452	1900	
140	49 "Zorroza"; 50 "Montes Claros"; 51 "Cistierna"; 52 "Prado"; 53 "Valmaseda"; 54 "La Ercina"	Baldwin Locomotive Works, Philadelphia	18472–18477	1900	
140	55 "Luis de Salazar"; 56 "Zabalainchaureta"	Baldwin Locomotive Works, Philadelphia	45349–45350	1917	
141 T	60 "C. Ma. de Ustara"	ALCO, Cooke	57890	1917	
042 T	71 "E. de la Gandara"; 72 "Casilda de Iturrrizar"	Krauss, Marsfeld	7809–7810	1921	Engerth. No. 72 reconstructed by Babcock & Wilcox in 1950
131+131 T	80 "Venancio de Echevarría"; 81 "José J. de Ampuero"	Hanomag	10646–10647	1929	Garratt. No. 81 reconstructed by Babcock & Wilcox in 1942
131+131 T	82 "Enrique de Borda"; 83 "José Mª de Basterra-Ortiz"	Babcock & Wilcox	421–422	1931	Garratt.
141 T	90 "Pablo Callam"; 91 "José Escudero"; 92 "Víctor Tapia"	Skoda	491–493	1928	Acquired from Companhia Mineiro do Lena, Portugal, nos. 10 to 12, in 1941
141 T	93 "Joaquín Eulate"	Babcock & Wilcox	620	1953	
140	102 "Ceferino de Urien"; 104 "José de Aresti"; 105 "Guillermo Baraudiaran"; 106 "Manuel Oraa"; 109 "José Ignacio Ustara"; 110 "José María San Martín"; 111 "Victoriano Garay"	SLM, Winterthur	1583; 1587; 1707; 1708; 1813; 1814; 1815	1904; 1904; 1906; 1906; 1907; 1907; 1907	1949 ex RhB; 1950 ex RhB 1951 ex RhB; 1952 ex RhB; 1920 ex RhB; 1920 ex RhB; 1920 ex RhB

=== Diesel locomotives ===
From 1955 diesel locomotives began arriving in Spain: the Union Française BB44, or BB500, later called the Series 1000 by FEVE, manufactured by Alsthom, which were the first to begin replacing steam traction — a process that would take 15 years to complete. The following are the models used to date by La Robla:

Model	Image	Series no.	Manufacturer	Year	Notes
Series 1000		1021–1063	**Alsthom**, Levallois-Perret	1955	Acquired by Sociedad Ferrocarriles de La Robla, S.A. and assigned to FEVE, which redistributed them, in 1972. Some rebuilt as Series 1900.
Series 1300		1318–1325	**SECN**, Sestao	1966	Acquired by Sociedad Ferrocarriles de La Robla, S.A. and assigned to FEVE, which redistributed them, in 1972. No. 1322 remains on display in Cistierna. Shunting vehicle.
**Series 1500**		1501–1510; 1511–1515	**General Electric, Erie**; **Babcock & Wilcox**, Sestao	1964; 1974	Known as GECo. Acquired by Sociedad Ferrocarriles de La Robla, S.A. and assigned to FEVE in 1972. Nos. 1511–1515 acquired by FEVE from the Ferrocarril del Tajuña in 2000. No. 1514 sold to Argentina.
**Series 1600**		1651–1660	**MTM**, Barcelona	1981	Under Alsthom licence.
**Series 1900**		1901–1917	**FEVE**, El Berrón; **CAF-Sunsundegui**, Alsasua	2002	Rebuilt from Series 1000.

NOTE: In bold, models still in active service as of 31 May 2009.

=== Railcars ===
After the line reopened in 2003 and the growing importance of commuter services, FEVE introduced diesel railcars for short-distance services — more frequent but with lower occupancy than conventional trains.

Model	Image	Series no.	Manufacturer	Year	Notes
**Series 2400**		2401–2479	**MTM**, Barcelona	1983	Acquired by FEVE for other lines. Several sold to Costa Rica.
**Series 2600**		2601–2624	**CAF-Sunsundegui**, Alsasua	1994	Built by rebuilding units of the Series 2300.
**Series 2700**		2701–	**CAF-Sunsundegui**, Alsasua	2009	New-build model. 23 units ordered; deliveries began in August 2009.
**Series 2900**		2901–	**CAF-Sunsundegui**, Alsasua	2009	New-build model. Derived from the 2700.

NOTE: In bold, models still in active service as of 23 February 2011.

== Route ==
=== Geographical difficulties ===
The extent of the area traversed by the La Robla railway and its complex topography mean that at certain points intervention has been necessary to ensure stability (see the elevation profile above). Some of the most notable points are the following:

- The Alto del Cabrio pass (750 m asl), natural access to the Valle de Mena, where a progressive descent begins from Espinosa de los Monteros (Burgos) down to sea level at the Luchana neighbourhood in Barakaldo (Biscay). (43°05′30″N 3°26′08″W)
- The bridge over the Ebro Reservoir, which near Arija crosses one of the reservoir's arms for 150 m. (42°59′16″N 3°57′12″W)
- Numerous cuttings are excavated through the mountains to facilitate the railway's passage, such as the Navarros cutting between Mataporquera and Los Carabeos, in Cantabria.
- Also celebrated are the iron bridges reserved exclusively for the railway, such as those at Matallana over the Torío River (42°50′26″N 5°31′25″W) or at Guardo over the Carrión River (42°47′18″N 4°50′58″W).
- The route is perpendicular to the watersheds of rivers such as the Torío, Esla, Cea, Carrión, Ebro, Engaña, and Trueba.

=== Original route ===
The route between La Robla and Luchana (Barakaldo) passed through, among others, the following localities, listed by province:

==== Province of León ====
La Robla, Rabanal de Fenar, Matallana de Torío, Robles de la Valcueva, La Valcueva, Aviados, Campohermoso, La Vecilla, Valdepiélago, La Mata de la Riba, Boñar, La Losilla, La Devesa de Boñar, Barrillos de las Arrimadas, La Ercina, Yugueros, Cistierna, Sorriba, Valle de las Casas, La Llama de la Guzpeña, Prado de la Guzpeña, Puente Almuhey, Valcuende, and La Espina.

==== Province of Palencia ====
Guardo, Santibáñez de la Peña, Villaverde de la Peña, Tarilonte de la Peña, Castrejón de la Peña, Vado-Cervera, Salinas de Pisuerga, and Cillamayor.

==== Province of Cantabria ====
Mataporquera, Los Carabeos, Montes Claros, Las Rozas, and Llano.

==== Province of Burgos ====
Arija, Cabañas de Virtus, Soncillo, Robredo de Las Pueblas, Ahedo de las Pueblas, Dosante, Cidad de Valdeporres, Pedrosa de Valdeporres, Sotoscueva, Redondo, Espinosa de los Monteros, Quintana de los Prados, Bercedo, Cadagua, Mercadillo, Ungo Nava, Anzo, and El Berrón.

==== Province of Biscay ====
Balmaseda, Ibarra, Zalla, Güeñes, Sodupe, La Cuadra, Zaramillo, Iráuregui, and finally Luchana (until 1972, when FEVE took over operations).

=== Changes made ===
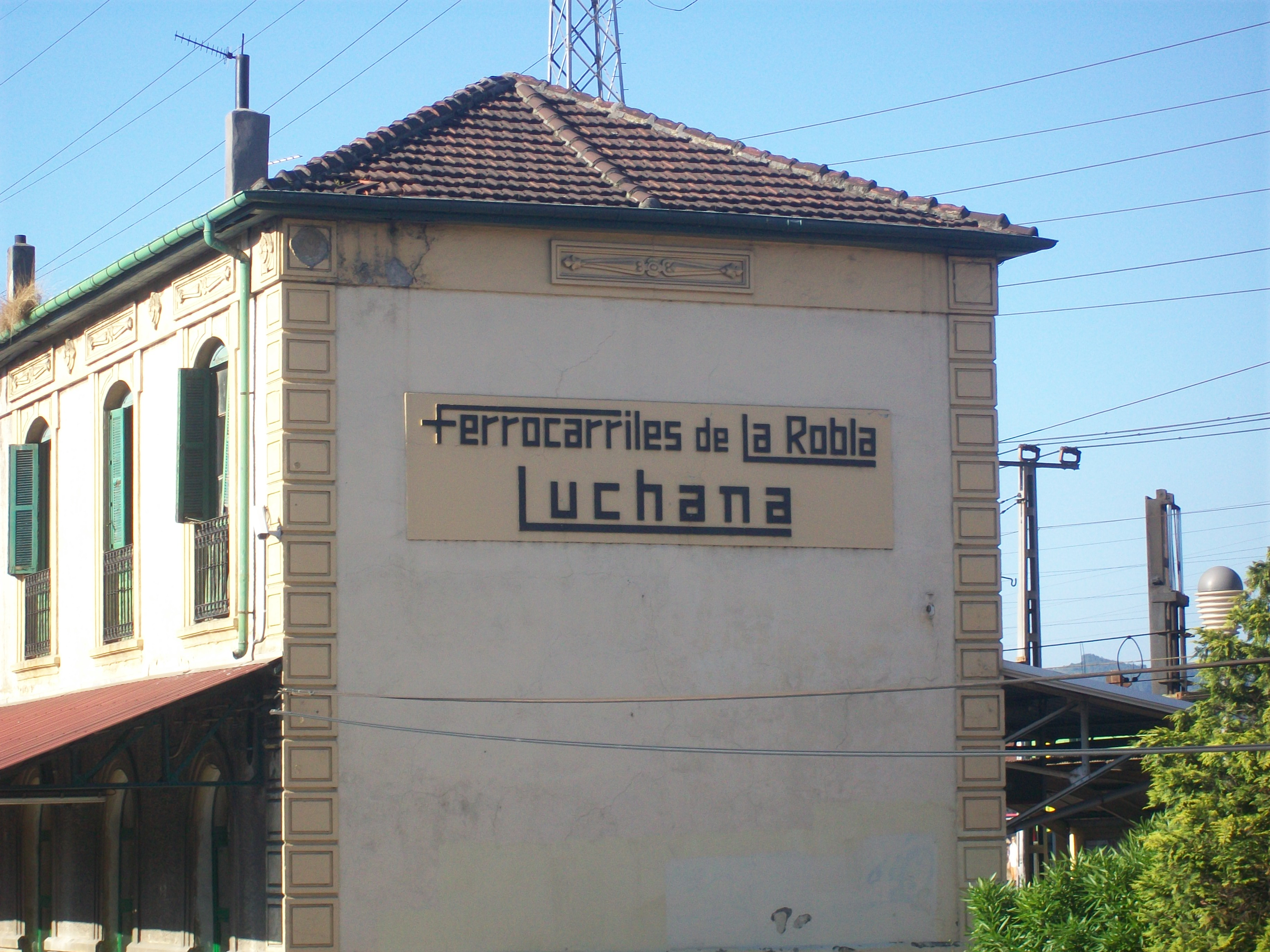
Luchana station with its original sign. To the right are the platforms of the BPT and to the left stood those of the La Robla railway.

- The La Robla–Matallana section ceased to be used for passenger services, with direct access to Matallana from León instead provided via Navatejera, Villaquilambre, and San Feliz de Torío.
- The Aranguren–Iráuregui section was discontinued in 1911 and a new one was built on the other side of the Cadagua River owing to disagreements with the Santander–Bilbao Railway Company. When FEVE took over operations in 1972, it decided to dispense with one of the two routes and, interestingly, reverted to the arrangement of connections used before 1911, retaining the Iráuregui–Luchana section and dismantling the remainder.
- The Iráuregui–Luchana section also ceased to be used for passenger services. The current León–Bilbao line continues from Iráuregui southward, using the already-built section of the Santander–Bilbao Railway, via small halts in Bilbao (Castrejana neighbourhood) and its boundary with Barakaldo; and finally reaching central Bilbao via the stations of Zorroza, Basurto, and Amézola, terminating at Bilbao-Concordia (line R-4). Luchana station is used by lines C1 and C2 of Cercanías Bilbao.

=== Proposed link projects ===
The transversal development of the La Robla railway generated many projects for links with other important areas or railway lines. None of the following projects (some of which even received concessions and specific enabling legislation) was ever carried out:

- Link with the Cantabrian Railway (via Riaño and Cangas de Onís).
- Link with the Vasco-Asturian Railway (via the San Isidro pass pass).
- Extension of León to Palanquinos, to connect with the Ferrocarriles Secundarios de Castilla.
- Extension of Guardo to Palencia.
- Extension of Cabañas de Virtus to Santander.
- Extension of Las Rozas to Reinosa.
- Extension of León to Benavente.
- Branch to Villarcayo.
- Branch to Astorga.

== Interpretation centre ==
The influence of the railway on the popular culture of the towns along its route has been considerable. Indeed, on 11 February 2006, the La Robla Railway Interpretation Centre was inaugurated in Mataporquera, in facilities made available by FEVE to the municipality. Inside, visitors are introduced to the economic and territorial context that made the construction of the railway possible, as well as being shown original management documents and graphic material from its history. There is also an exhibition on the difficulty of the route, its diverse rolling stock, and the culture and events surrounding it.

== Current service ==
=== Lines ===
On 19 March 2003, following an agreement between FEVE and the Junta of Castile and León, the León–Bilbao route was reinstated as a regional passenger train service (line R-4), along with services described as cercanías (commuter). The active lines are as follows:

Departures from León
* 7 daily services to Cistierna stopping at Ventas / San Mamés, Hospitales, Asunción/Universidad, Villa Romana, La Raya, Villaquilambre, Villasinta, San Feliz, Palazuelo, Garrafe, Manzaneda, Matueca, Pedrún, Pardavé, Naredo, Matallana, Robles, Valcueva, Aviados, Campohermoso, La Vecilla, Valdepiélago, Otero, La Mata, Boñar, La Losilla, La Devesa, Barrillos, La Ercina, Yugueros and Cistierna.
* 2 daily services to Guardo stopping at all the above plus Sorriba, Valle de Las Casas, La Llama de la Guzpeña, Prado de La Guzpeña, Cerezal de la Guzpeña, Puente Almuhey, Valcuende, La Espina, Guardo and Guardo/Halt.
* 1 daily service to Bilbao stopping at San Feliz, Matallana, La Vecilla, Boñar, La Ercina, Cistierna, Sorriba, Valle de Las Casas, La Llama de la Guzpeña, Prado de La Guzpeña, Cerezal de la Guzpeña, Puente Almuhey, Valcuende, La Espina, Guardo, Guardo/Halt, Santibáñez de la Peña, Villaverde Tarilonte, Castrejón de la Peña, Vado Cervera, Salinas de Pisuerga, Cillamayor, Mataporquera, Los Carabeos, Montes Claros, Las Rozas, Llano, Arija, Cabañas de Virtus, Soncillo, Robredo Ahedo, Dosante Cidad, Pedrosa, Sotoscueva, Redondo, Espinosa de Los Monteros, Quintana, Bercedo, Cadagua, Mercadillo, Ungo Nava, Arla-Berrón, Valmaseda, Zalla, Aranguren/Halt, Aranguren, Sodupe, Zaramillo, Iráuregui, Zorroza, Basurto, Amézola and Bilbao.

Departures from Bilbao
* 1 daily service to León stopping at Amézola, Basurto, Zorroza, Iráuregui, Zaramillo, Sodupe, Aranguren, Aranguren/Halt, Zalla, Valmaseda, Arla-Berrón, Ungo Nava, Mercadillo, Cadagua, Bercedo, Quintana, Espinosa de Los Monteros, Redondo, Sotoscueva, Pedrosa, Dosante Cidad, Robredo Ahedo, Soncillo, Cabañas de Virtus, Arija, Llano, Las Rozas, Montes Claros, Los Carabeos, Mataporquera, Cillamayor, Salinas de Pisuerga, Vado Cervera, Castrejón de la Peña, Villaverde Tarilonte, Santibáñez de la Peña, Guardo/Halt, Guardo, La Espina, Valcuende, Puente Almuhey, Cerezal de la Guzpeña, Prado de La Guzpeña, La Llama de la Guzpeña, Valle de Las Casas, Sorriba, Cistierna, La Ercina, Boñar, La Vecilla, Matallana, San Feliz and León.

=== Vehicles ===
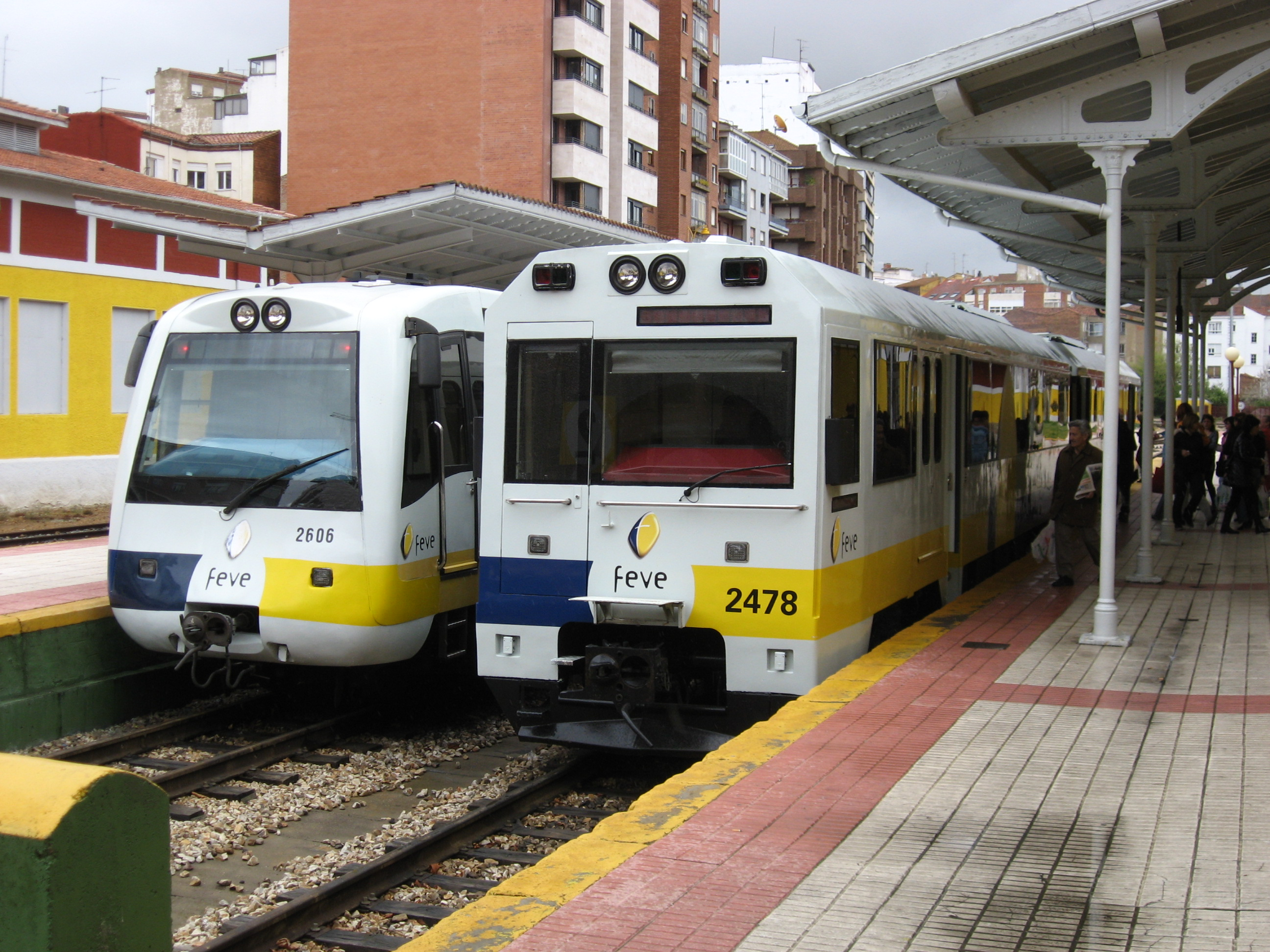
A Series 2600 and a Series 2400 DMU at the metre-gauge station managed by Adif in León.

The models used for passenger traffic have been diesel DMU vehicles of the Series 2400 from MTM and Series 2600 from CAF for commuter services, and convoys hauled by Series 1500 and Series 1600 locomotives for the León–Bilbao line.

Since 2009, Series 2900 railcars have been used for commuter services and Series 2700 for the León–Bilbao line, progressively replacing the earlier units.

Since summer 2024, Series 2700 railcars have been used for the Valmaseda–Mataporquera section, as Series 3600 electric units are used between Bilbao and Valmaseda, and Series 2600 between Mataporquera and León — the same units used on the León Cercanías network — meaning that passengers must change trains at Mataporquera, where trains travelling in opposite directions cross.

Coal transport is carried out via freight trains formed by double or triple traction of Series 1500 locomotives and hopper wagons for coal transport. The modern Series 1900 have also been incorporated for freight services.

== Notable appearances ==
- In the film Cuerda de presos, directed by Pedro Lazaga in 1955, the hullero appears when the three main characters are transfixed by the passage of the train.
- In Sor Citroën (1967), also by Pedro Lazaga, the protagonist's father is station master at La Robla, and in one of its scenes he gives the signal for the train to depart.
- In the film Luna de lobos, directed by Julio Sánchez Valdés (1987), based on the novel of the same name by Julio Llamazares, and set in the years following the Spanish Civil War, the train also features prominently in one of its scenes near Cistierna.
- In A galope tendido, directed by Julio Suárez in 2000, which tells the story of a young man who works as a railway accountant obsessed with Western novels, much of the action takes place around the La Robla railway. It stars Sancho Gracia, Kiti Manver, Ramón Langa, Aitor Merino, and Ana Álvarez.

== Gastronomy ==
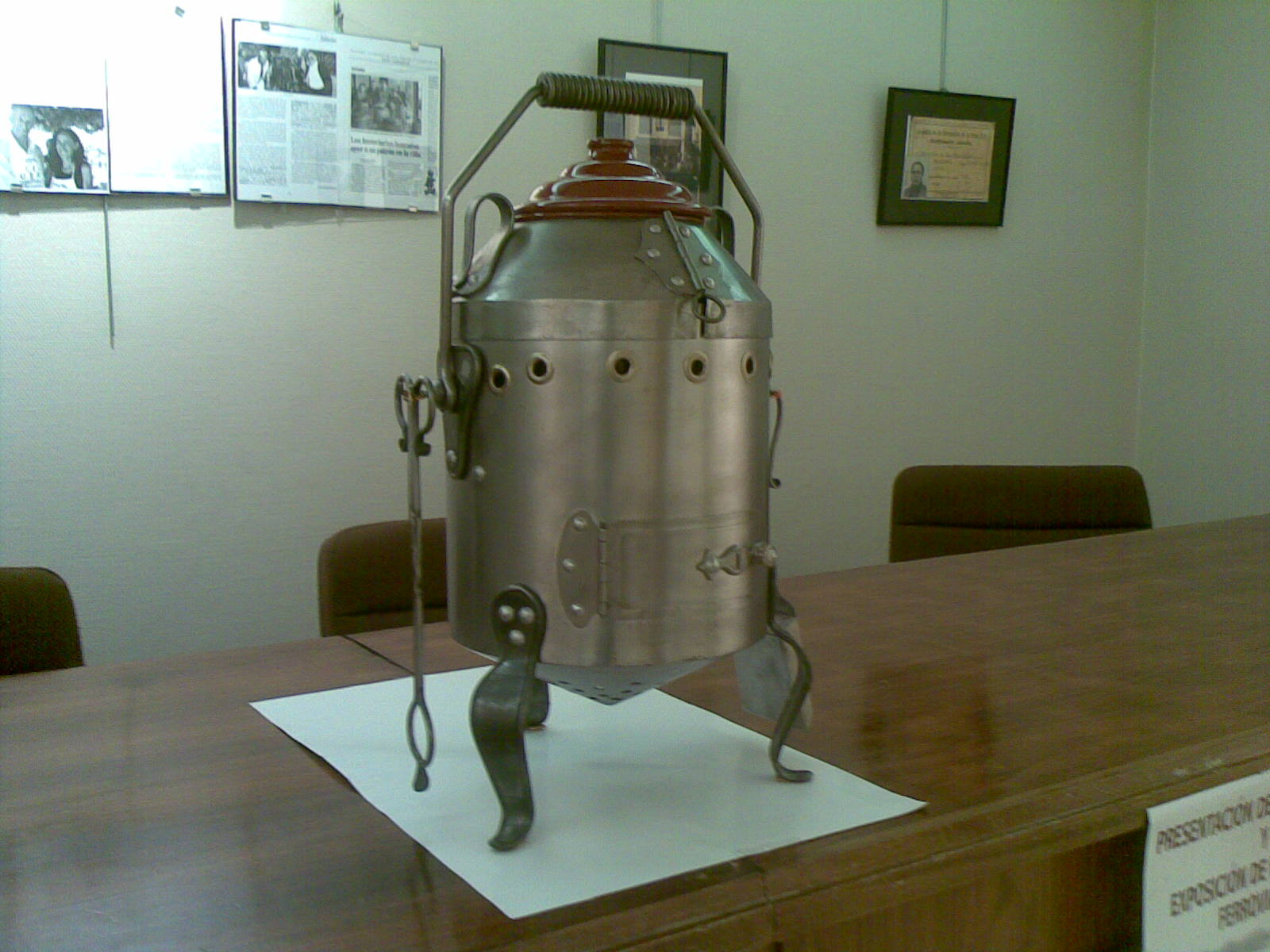
A ferroviaria cooking pot, with the typical puchero inside.

The Olla ferroviaria (Railway pot)

The social influence of the La Robla railway has even extended to the culinary sphere, making famous a dish born from the demands of long journeys and the harsh climate: the Olla ferroviaria. It arose from the ingenuity of the old engine drivers and firemen, who devised a system for cooking using the heat of the locomotive's engine. They were manufactured at the workshops in Cistierna and Valmaseda, and consisted of a casing or outer shell of tin plate, hermetically sealed with a hole in the base to release water vapour, inside which the cooking pot was placed.

The composition of the pot varies according to the area: it may consist of white beans in Cistierna, pottage in Guardo, potatoes with veal in Mataporquera, or a bean stew in Valmaseda. The name also varies depending on the region where it is cooked: it may be called Olla ferroviaria, Puchera ferroviaria, or simply Putxera, and it is commonly found in establishments along the route.

== Bibliography ==
- Bacigalupe, Carlos (2004): Viejo caballo de hierro. Un viaje en el ferrocarril de La Robla. Muelle de Uribitarte, Bilbao. ISBN 978-84-921998-6-0
- Fernández Díaz-Sarabia, Pedro (2004): "El Ferrocarril de La Robla". In: Miguel Muñoz Rubio and Rafael Alcaide González (eds.), Historia de los Ferrocarriles de Vía Estrecha en España, Fundación de los Ferrocarriles Españoles, Madrid. ISBN 84-88675-99-2
- Fernández López, Javier and Zaita, Carmelo (1997): El ferrocarril de la Robla, Agualarga, Madrid. ISBN 84-88959-77-X
- Garaikoetxea, Arantza (1994): El ferrocarril de la Robla: Cien años del hullero, 1894-1994, S.C.D. y R. Bilbao Hogar Leones. FEVE, Dirección de Comunicación. ISBN 84-88974-05-1
- Narganes Quijano, Faustino (1999): "Un hombre clave de finales del s. XIX en el desarrollo del Norte Palentino", Publicaciones de la Institución Tello Téllez de Meneses 70, pp. 537–567.
- Sánchez Melado, Jesús (2006): Crisis de la minería del carbón y transformación del espacio: el caso de las cuencas orientales leonesas, Universidad de Valladolid, Valladolid.
- Santamaría, Ricardo and ZALDÍBAR, Marta (2004): La puchera encartada y el ferrocarril de La Robla, Salgai, Bilbao. ISBN 978-84-931494-9-9

=== Multimedia ===
- Vida y muerte: resurrección de un tren. El hullero cabalga de nuevo. Televisión Española, 2003. Director: Antxon Urrusolo. Running time: 50 min.
