= Rhaetian Railway G 4/5 =

Swiss narrow-gauge steam locomotive class

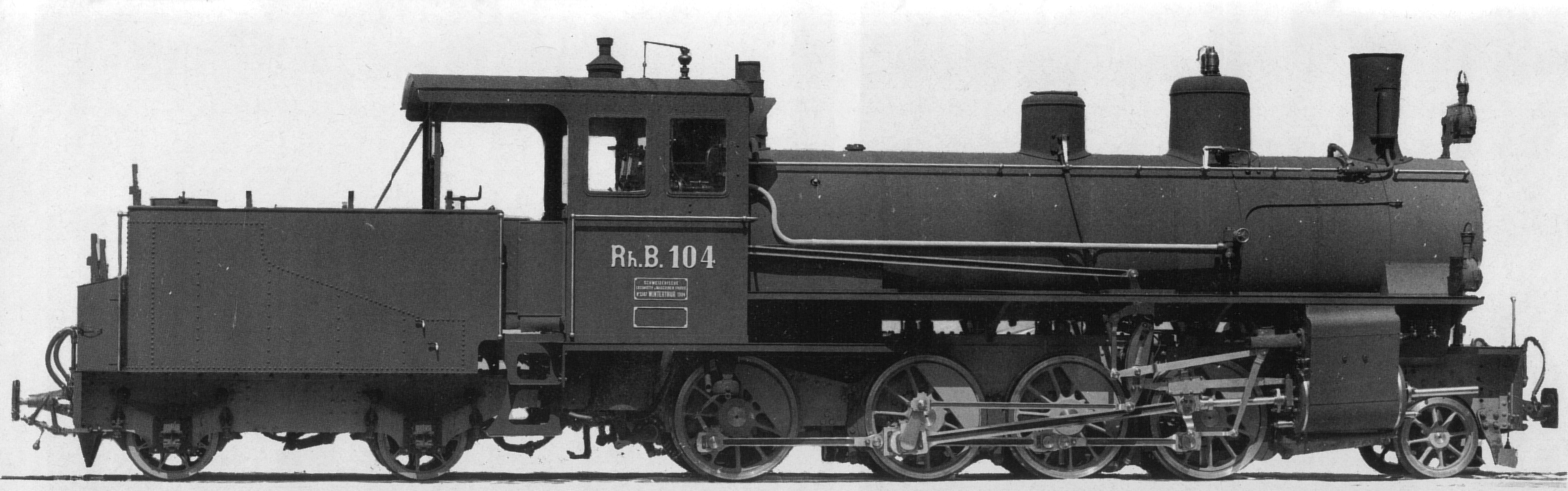
- G 4/5 No. 104, SLM builders' photo from 1904
Type and origin
- Power type: Steam
- Builder: Swiss Locomotive and Machine Works
- Build date: 1904–1915
- Total produced: 29
Specifications
- Configuration
  - Whyte: 2-8-0
  - UIC: 101–106: 1′D n2v 107–129: 1′D h2
- Gauge: 1,000 mm (3 ft 3 3/8 in)
- Leading dia.: 700 mm (27.56 in)
- Driver dia.: 1,050 mm (41.34 in)
- Wheelbase: Loco: 6,100 mm (20 ft 0 in)
- Length: 101–104: 13,220 mm (43 ft 4 in); 105–129: 13,970 mm (45 ft 10 in)
- Width: 2,550 mm (8 ft 4 in)
- Height: 3,670 mm (12 ft 0 in)
- Adhesive weight: 101–104: 40.9 tonnes (90,200 lb); 105–128: 41.6 tonnes (91,700 lb); 129: 42.5 tonnes (93,700 lb)
- Total weight: 101–104: 58.9 tonnes (129,900 lb); 105–106: 67.3 tonnes (148,400 lb); 107–122: 67.5 tonnes (148,800 lb); 123–128: 68.5 tonnes (151,000 lb); 129: 69.7 tonnes (153,700 lb)
- Fuel type: Coal
- Fuel capacity: 101–104: 2.0 tonnes (4,400 lb); 105–129: 2.5 tonnes (5,500 lb)
- Water cap.: 101–104: 5,000 L (1,100 imp gal; 1,300 US gal); 105–122: 9,800 L (2,200 imp gal; 2,600 US gal); 123–129: 10,000 L (2,200 imp gal; 2,600 US gal)
- Firebox
  - Grate area: 101–104: 1.9 m^{2} (20 sq ft); 105–129: 2.1 m^{2} (23 sq ft)
- Boiler pressure: 101–104: 13 atm (1.32 MPa; 191 psi), 105–106: 14 atm (1.42 MPa; 206 psi); 107–129: 12 atm (1.22 MPa; 176 psi)
- Heating surface: 101–104: 117.6 m^{2} (1,266 sq ft); 105–106: 131.4 m^{2} (1,414 sq ft); 107–129: 133.0 m^{2} (1,432 sq ft)
- Superheater
  - Heating area: 107–129: 27.5 m^{2} (296 sq ft)
- Cylinders: 101–106: Two, outside (compound), 107–129: Two, outside (simple)
- Cylinder size: 107–108: 440 mm × 580 mm (17.32 in × 22.83 in); 109–129: 460 mm × 580 mm (18.11 in × 22.83 in)
- High-pressure cylinder: 101–106: 440 mm × 580 mm (17.32 in × 22.83 in)
- Low-pressure cylinder: 101–106: 660 mm × 580 mm (25.98 in × 22.83 in)
- Valve gear: Walschaerts
- Valve type: Piston valves
- Loco brake: Hand operated spindle Counter-pressure, Riggenbach type
- Train brakes: Vacuum, Hardy type
Performance figures
- Maximum speed: 45 km/h (28 mph)
- Power output: 101–104: 440 PS (320 kW; 430 hp); 105–129: 800 PS (590 kW; 790 hp)
Career
- Operators: Rhaetian Railway
- Class: G 4/5
- Numbers: 101–129
- Locale: Graubünden, Switzerland
- Retired: 1920–1952
- Preserved: 2 in Switzerland (operational); 2 in Thailand (static)

The Rhaetian Railway G 4/5 was a class of metre gauge 2-8-0 steam locomotives operated by the Rhaetian Railway (RhB), which is the main railway network in the Canton of Graubünden, Switzerland.

The class was named G 4/5 under the Swiss locomotive and railcar classification system. According to that system, G 4/5 denotes a narrow gauge steam locomotive with a total of five axles, four of which are drive axles.

The Rhaetian Railway procured a total of 29 examples of the G 4/5 class between 1904 and 1915. Built as tender locomotives by the Swiss Locomotive and Machine Works (SLM) in Winterthur, the G 4/5s were used mainly on the Albula Railway until that line was electrified in 1919. Two preserved examples of the class are still in service on the Rhaetian Railway network today.

== History ==
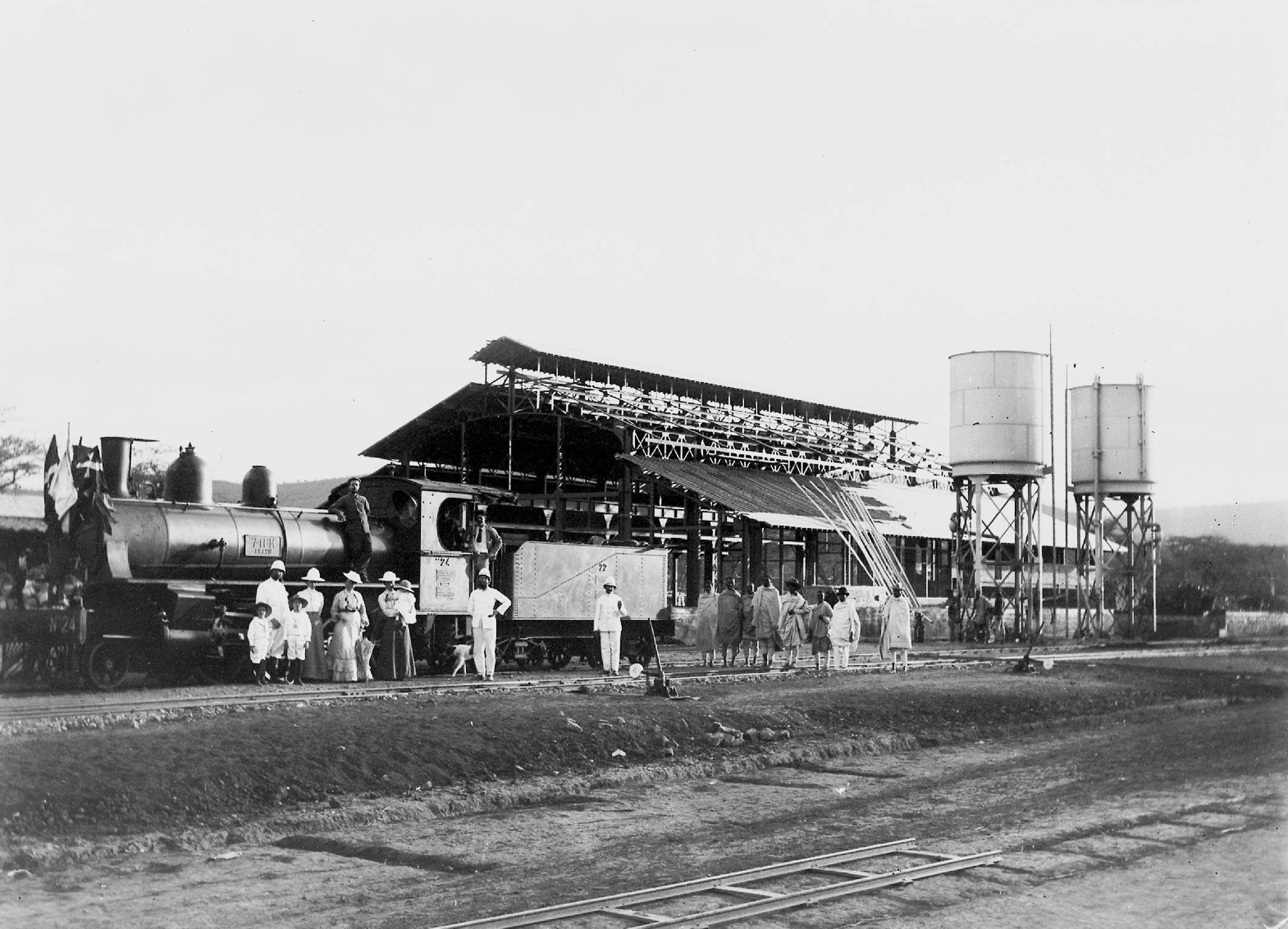
A locomotive of the type tested on the Rhaetian Railway, in Dire Dawa, Ethiopia

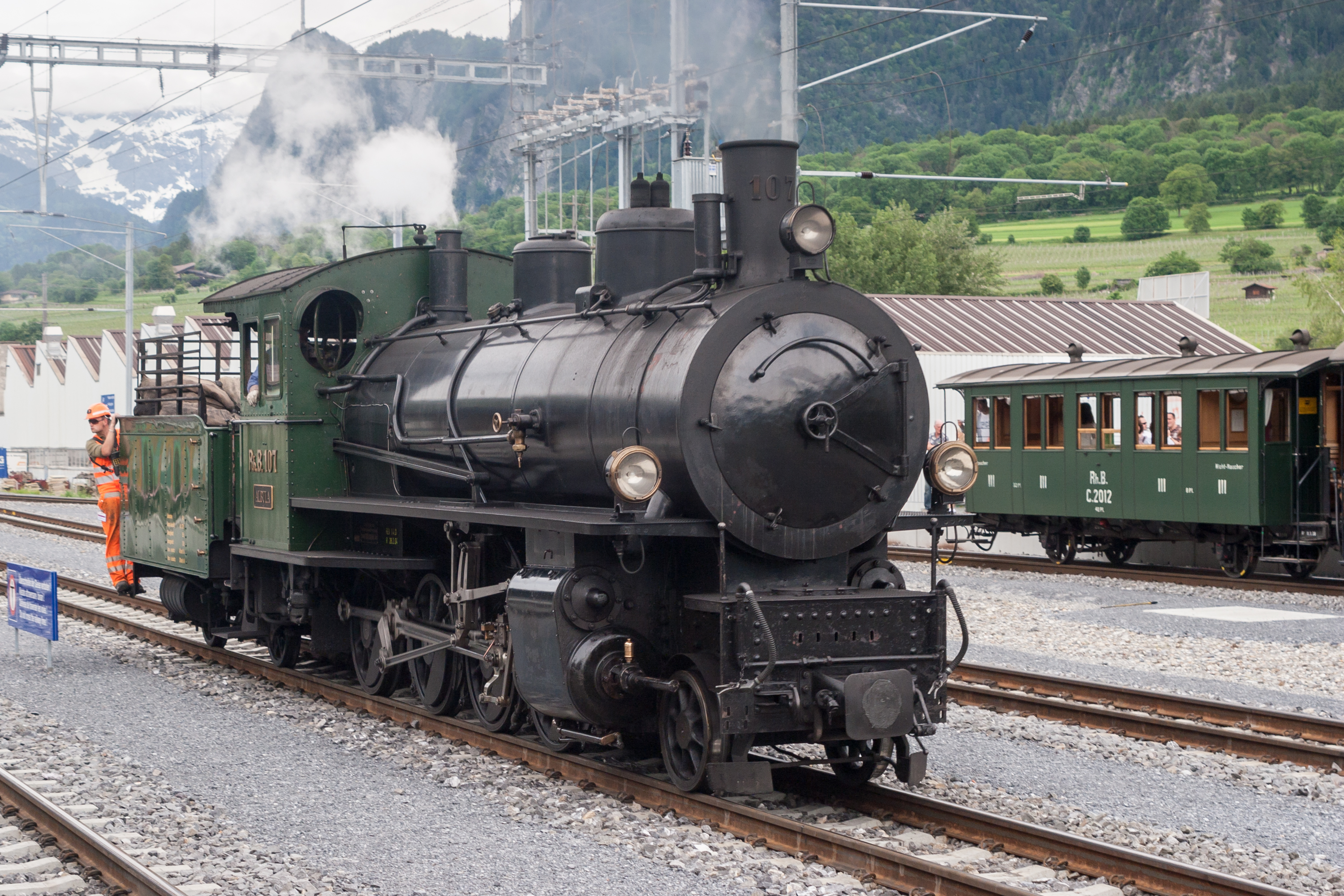
RhB G 4-5 Nr. 107 "Albula" in Untervaz-Trimmis

As early as 1902, the SLM manufactured two four-coupled saturated steam locomotives for the Imperial Railway Company of Ethiopia. In the same year, trial runs using one of these locomotives were carried out on the Rhaetian Railway. The positive results of these tests led the Board of the Rhaetian Railway to order four largely identical machines, at a price of 61,500 Swiss Francs per unit. These G 4/5 class locomotives arrived in Graubünden between June and August 1904, and were given the operating numbers 101 to 104.

The performance specifications for the G 4/5s stipulated that they be able to haul a trailing load of 90 tonnes (89 long tons; 99 short tons) at a speed of 18 kilometres per hour (11 mph) on a gradient of 3.5%, while on level sections a speed of 45 kilometres per hour (28 mph) should be reached. Trial runs showed, however, that the machines were powerful enough to move the required load at as fast as 22 kilometres per hour (14 mph) on gradients, while on level sections a top speed of 52 kilometres per hour (32 mph) could be achieved.

The continuing rise in traffic on the Rhaetian Railway soon required more powerful locomotives. The company therefore decided in 1906 to purchase four further G 4/5s of higher performance than the initial batch. Train loads of 95 tonnes (93 long tons; 105 short tons) were now required to be hauled up gradients of 3.5% at a top speed of 32 kilometres per hour (20 mph). While the new G 4/5s nos 105 and 106 were manufactured in the traditional saturated steam configuration, nos 107 and 108 used superheated steam for the first time on the Rhaetian Railway. The performance of the two new sub-types was similar. With each producing nearly 600 kilowatts (800 hp), they were regarded as the world's most powerful narrow gauge locomotives.

As the superheated configuration for the class was now proven, all subsequently ordered G 4/5s were equipped with superheaters. To 1915, a total of 21 further locomotives, in five separate orders, were so obtained. The last locomotive, no 129, also received a preheater. With a total of 29 examples, the G 4/5 also eventually became the largest single class of locomotives on the Rhaetian Railway to this day.

In the meantime, coal shortages during World War I had called into question the further use of steam locomotives. The Rhaetian Railway had therefore decided to electrify all of its lines on the model of the Engadine Railway, opened in 1913. The electrification project was able to be completed in 1922. In 1920, the now surplus locomotives nos. 109, 110 and 111 were sold to the La Robla railway in Spain, and in 1949 those locomotives were followed by nos 102 and 104 to 106. In Spain, the G 4/5s remained in service until about 1970. Meanwhile, in 1924, locomotives 101 and 103 went to Brazil.

Locomotives 112 to 129 went in 1926 and 1927 to the Royal State Railways of Siam (now Thailand), where a few examples were in use up to the 1960s. Locomotive 118 has since been preserved in Chiang Mai as a monument, and locomotive 123 has been kept for display in a railway museum.

Only locomotives 107 and 108 remained at the Rhaetian Railway as non-catenary dependent reserves for snow removal, building work and goods trains. Since the 1960s, they have also worked increasingly on special trains for railway enthusiasts. Locomotive 107 is presently stationed in Landquart, while no 108 is based in Samedan. On the occasion of the Graubünden Steam Festival 2006 and the simultaneous 100th anniversary of the Albula Railway, both locomotives were given names. Since then, no 107 has carried the name Albula, and no 108 the name Engiadina.

== Construction ==
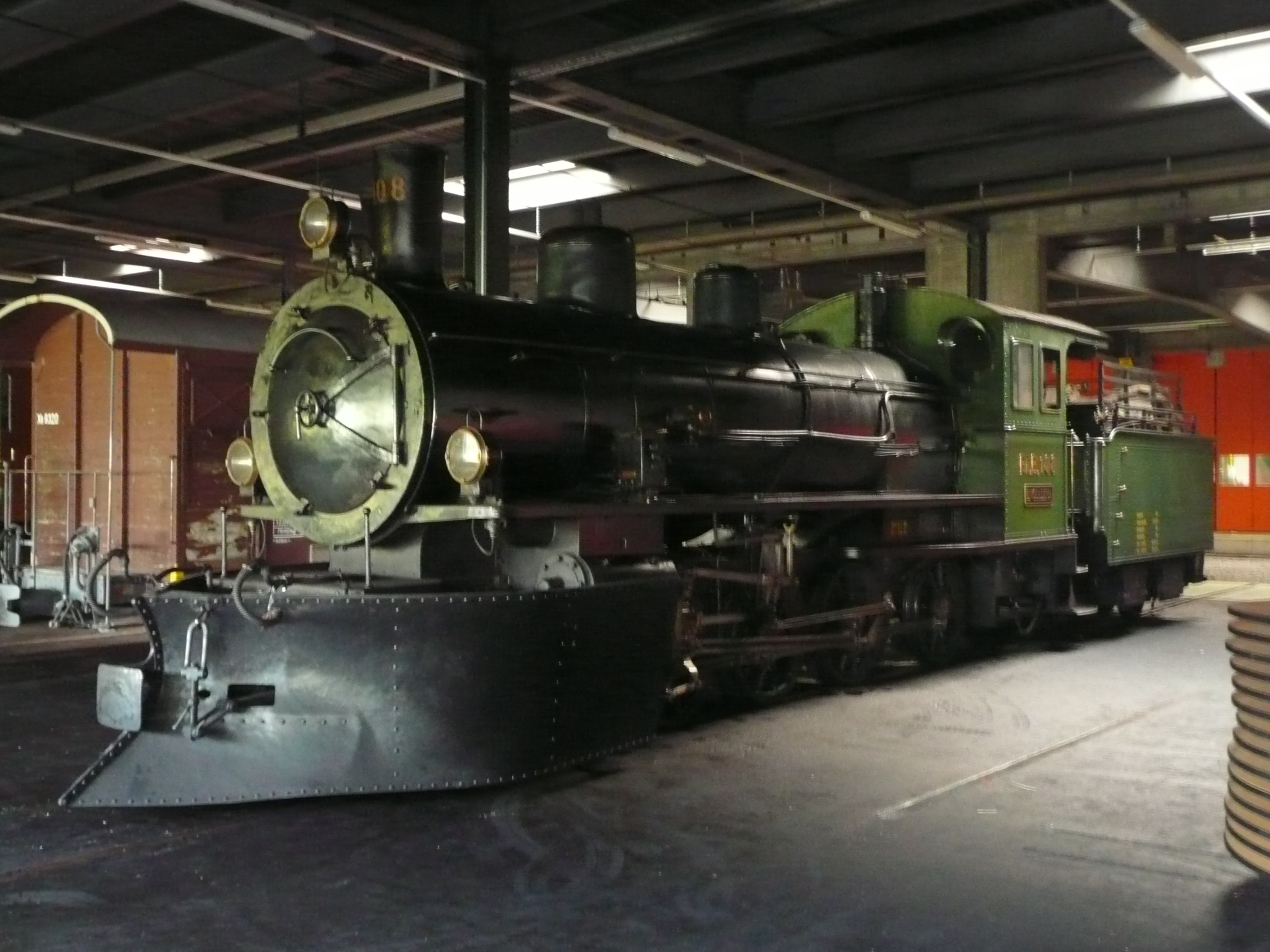
G 4/5 108 inside Samedan locomotive shed

The G 4/5 was a four coupled tender locomotive with a leading axle in a swiveling pony truck. Whereas the first six examples were delivered as saturated steam compound locomotives, all of the remaining examples came into service as superheated machines with single stage steam expansion.

The coupled wheels, with a diameter of 1,050 millimetres (41 in), were mounted in a 30 millimetres (1.2 in) thick inside plate frame. To increase maneuverability on curves, the second and fourth coupled axles could each swing 30 millimetres (1.2 in) radially in both directions. Drive was to the third coupled axle. The outside cylinders were inclined at 1 in 20 on the saturated steam engines, and on the superheated engines the incline was 1 in 40. On the saturated steam engines, the high-pressure cylinder was on the right hand side of the locomotive, and the low-pressure cylinder on the left hand side.

The two-stage cylindrical boiler had over 176 tubes on locomotives 101 to 104, and on locomotives 105 and 106 the number was increased to 196. The superheated machines 107 to 129 each had more than 112 heating and 18 smoke tubes, and a Schmidt type superheater. Boiler pressure of the G 4/5s was originally 13 standard atmospheres (1.32 MPa; 191 psi), and was increased to 14 standard atmospheres (1.42 MPa; 206 psi) for locomotives 105 and 106. In the case of the superheated locomotives, this value could ultimately be lowered again to 12 standard atmospheres (1.22 MPa; 176 psi). The boiler itself was connected with a smokebox set on a cast-iron saddle attached firmly to the frames, while the steel firebox rest upon the frames and moves freely to compensate for temperature induced elongation. On both sides of the boiler are flanked with a high-level frame. As a unique example, locomotive No. 129 was fitted with a preheater. This was mounted on the right side of the locomotive, below the high-level frame.

The locomotive tenders for the first four engines each held 2 tonnes (2.0 long tons; 2.2 short tons) of coal and 5,000 litres (1,100 imp gal; 1,300 US gal) of water. To reduce the travel times of fast trains between Chur and St Moritz, locomotives nos 105 onwards were given larger tenders. These held 2.5 tonnes (2.5 long tons; 2.8 short tons) of coal and 9,800 litres (2,200 imp gal; 2,600 US gal) of water, and made it possible to delete the majority of the intermediate coaling and watering stops. Only in Thusis was it still necessary for locomotives with the larger tenders to take on coal and water. From locomotive No. 123, the tenders were increased in size again. The further enlarged tenders had an unaltered coal capacity, but held 10,000 litres (2,200 imp gal; 2,600 US gal) of water.

Illumination of the initial batch of locomotives was by means of kerosene lanterns. By contrast, the locomotives delivered from 1906 onwards were fitted with electric lights. These were powered by an accumulator, which was charged by a generator attached to one of the rear axles of the tender. Locomotives nos 102 and 104, which remained with the Rhaetian Railway after 1924, were retrofitted during their service life with electric lights powered by a battery with no generator.

The braking system consisted of a hand-powered spindle brake operating on the tender axles, and a Hardy-type vacuum brake operating on the first and third coupled axles and both tender axles. For service on the inclined sections, a supplementary counter-pressure brake of Riggenbach type was fitted.

== List of locomotives ==
List of G 4/5 locomotives of the Rhaetian Railway
No.	Builders no.	Commissioning	Withdrawal	Purchase price (SFr.)	Current whereabouts
101	1582	18.06.1904	1924	61,500	Sold in 1924 to Estrada de Ferro Maricá, state of Rio de Janeiro, in Brazil; in 1943 at CB (Estrada de Ferro Central do Brasil), there renumbered #1230; in 1963 at EFL (Estrada de Ferro Leopoldina), withdrawn shortly after.
102	1583	28.06.1904	1949	61,500	To La Robla railway, there no. 102 Ceferino de Urien, withdrawn around 1970.
103	1584	06.07.1904	1924	61,500	Sold in 1924 to Estrada de Ferro Maricá, state of Rio de Janeiro, in Brazil; in 1943 at CB (Estrada de Ferro Central do Brasil), there renumbered #1231; in 1963 at EFL (Estrada de Ferro Leopoldina), withdrawn shortly after.
104	1587	12.08.1904	1950	61,500	To La Robla railway, there no. 104 José de Aresti, withdrawn around 1970.
105	1707	25.04.1906	1951	74,000	To La Robla railway, there no. 105 Guillermo Baraudiaran, withdrawn around 1970.
106	1708	30.04.1906	1952	74,000	To La Robla railway, there no. 106 Manuel Oraa, withdrawn around 1970.
107	1709	16.05.1906	-	77,500	Operational preserved locomotive, since 2006 named Albula.
108	1710	07.06.1906	-	77,500	Operational preserved locomotive, since 2006 named Engiadina.
109	1813	16.04.1907	1920	77,500	To La Robla railway, there no. 109 José Ignacio Ustara, withdrawn around 1970.
110	1814	24.04.1907	1920	77,500	To La Robla railway, there no. 110 José Maria San Martin, withdrawn around 1970.
111	1815	03.05.1907	1920	77,500	To La Robla railway, there Nr. 111 Victoriano Garay, withdrawn around 1970.
112	1816	18.05.1907	1927	77,500	To Royal State Railways of Siam, there no. 343, withdrawn 1956.
113	1817	27.05.1907	1927	77.500	To Royal State Railways of Siam, there no. 344, withdrawn 1954.
114	1818	04.06.1907	1927	77,500	To Royal State Railways of Siam, there no. 345, withdrawn 1950.
115	1987	23.04.1909	1927	77,500	To Royal State Railways of Siam, there no. 346, withdrawn 1950.
116	1988	30.04.1909	1927	77,500	To Royal State Railways of Siam, there no. 347, withdrawn 1953.
117	1989	07.05.1909	1927	77,500	To Royal State Railways of Siam, there no. 348, withdrawn 1950.
118	2208	23.03.1912	1926	77,500	To Royal State Railways of Siam, there no. 340, now a memorial in Chiang Mai.
119	2209	03.04.1912	1926	77,500	To Royal State Railways of Siam, there no. 342, withdrawn 1954.
120	2329	28.06.1913	1926	77,500	To Royal State Railways of Siam, there no. 341, withdrawn 1954.
121	2330	04.07.1913	1926	77,500	To Royal State Railways of Siam, there no. 339, withdrawn 1959.
122	2331	21.07.1913	1926	77,500	To Royal State Railways of Siam, there no. 338, withdrawn 1965.
123	2331	29.01.1914	1926	83,300	To Royal State Railways of Siam, there no. 336, intended for display in railway museum.
124	2510	06.05.1915	1926	83,300	To Royal State Railways of Siam, there no. 337, withdrawn 1964.
125	2511	10.05.1915	1926	83,300	To Royal State Railways of Siam, there no. 335, withdrawn 1953.
126	2512	17.05.1915	1926	83,300	To Royal State Railways of Siam, there no. 331, withdrawn 1956.
127	2513	31.05.1915	1926	83,300	To Royal State Railways of Siam, there no. 332, withdrawn 1961.
128	2514	08.06.1915	1926	83,300	To Royal State Railways of Siam, there no. 333, withdrawn 1958.
129	2515	12.07.1915	1926	86,500	To Royal State Railways of Siam, there no. 334, withdrawn 1950.
