= Hullera Vasco-Leonesa =

Spanish coal mining company (1893–2019)

S.A. Hullera Vasco-Leonesa
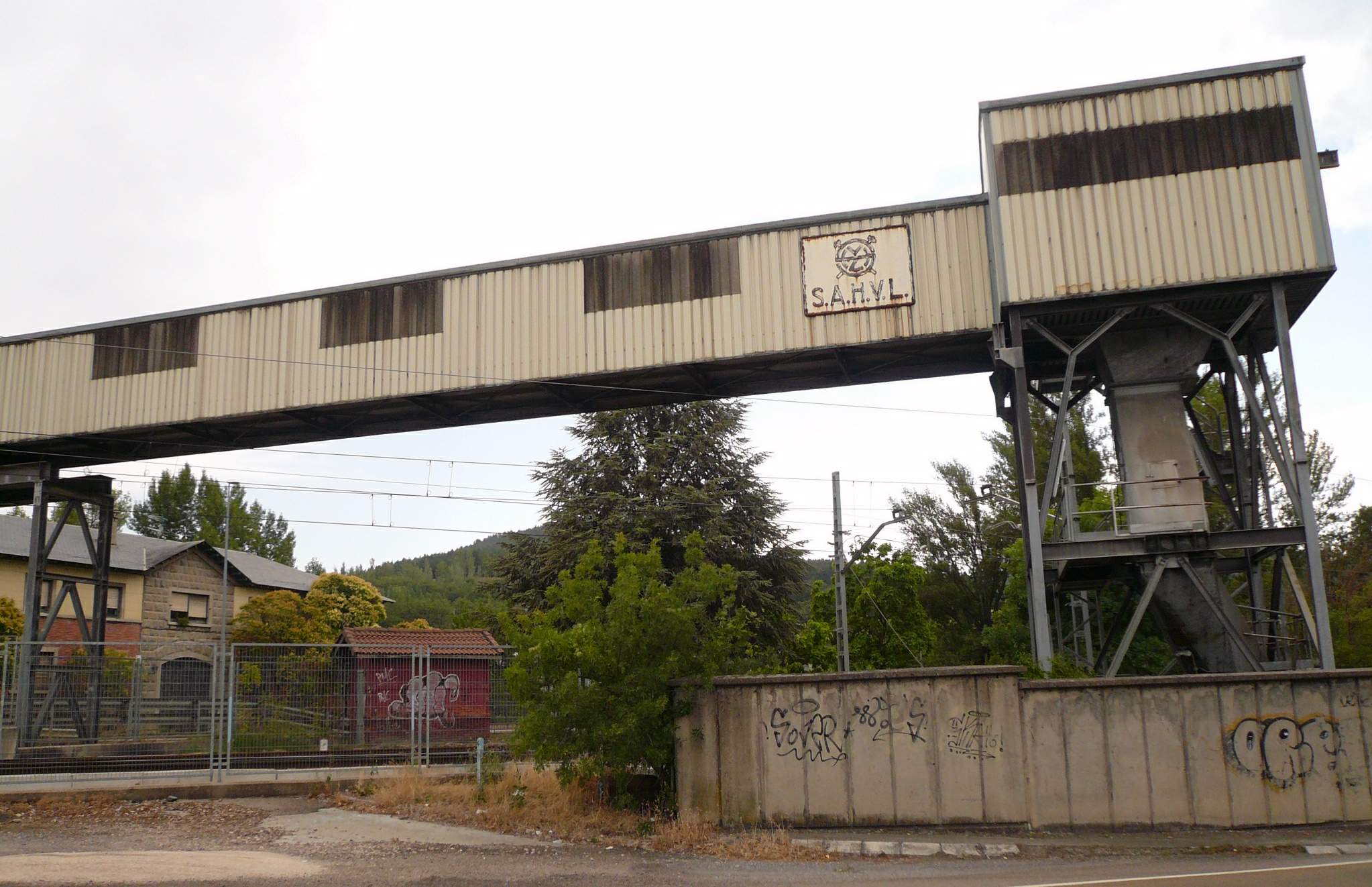
- Former coal unloading facility of SAHVL near the La Robla power station
- Type: Bolsa de Madrid: HVL; Bolsa de Bilbao: HVL
- Industry: Mining
- Predecessor: Compañía Amézola y Cía.
- Founded: 1893
- Founder: José de Amézola y Viriga
- Defunct: 2019
- Headquarters: Paseo de la Castellana, 126; Madrid, Spain
- Area served: Province of León
- Key people: Antonio del Valle Alonso (President)
- Products: Bituminous coal
- Production output: 1,200,000 t
- Services: 0510 Bituminous coal and coal extraction
- Net income: €2.914 million
- Total equity: 24,706,080
- Number of employees: 629
- Website: www.sahvl.es

The Sociedad Anónima Hullera Vasco-Leonesa, also known by its acronym HVL, was a Spanish company founded in 1893 whose main activity was the extraction and marketing of bituminous coal in the north of the country. Its area of operations was concentrated in the Leonese basin, though it also had operations in the Palentine basin. In its final period of activity, HVL had an average production of 1,200,000 t of coal. Its commercial headquarters were located on the Paseo de la Castellana in Madrid.

== History ==
The company was founded in Bilbao on 19 October 1893 by a group of Basque businessmen with a capital of 1,375,000 pesetas, and its first president was José de Amézola y Viriga, the company's largest shareholder. Its primary objective was the exploitation of the coalfields of León and Asturias, concentrating its initial activity in the Ciñera–Matallana basin in the Leonese Central Mountain range. Its first major contract was signed in 1896 with the Compañía de los Caminos de Hierro del Norte de España, to supply mineral fuel to the railway company.

The need for coal from the Leonese and Palentine basins in the Biscay ferrous industry prompted the construction of the La Robla railway, inaugurated in 1894, which facilitated the company's takeoff, reaching 100,000 t of production in 1912. In 1909, the company acquired Hulleras de Ciñera, which had operations at Santa Lucía and La Vid de Gordón.

In 1942, the company was acquired by the Leonese businessman Emilio del Valle Egocheaga. From then on it experienced substantial growth; in 1951 it built an agglomerate manufacturing plant at La Robla, supplying RENFE with 250,000 t per year to fuel its locomotives. Between 1960 and 1970, the company reached its production peak, attaining 870,000 t. In 1966 HVL became involved in one of its most controversial operations, when it acquired Hullas de Barruelo — a state-controlled company — in the Barruelo de Santullán basin (Palencia), presenting an ambitious restructuring plan. However, in 1967, alleging that the State had not fulfilled the agreed subsidies, the company declared a total crisis at the facilities and requested from the Labour Delegation the closure of the installations and the dismissal of all its employees. Thus, between 1969 and 1972, the Rubagón coal basin ceased operations after 100 years of history. Also in 1966, the company acquired a 50% stake in Hullas de Sabero, eventually becoming the majority shareholder.

The construction in 1971 of the La Robla power plant marked a turning point for HVL, as the station became its main customer, obliging the company to renew its facilities; a new coal washery was built at the site, taking on the company's entire output. Spain's entry into the European Economic Community and its policy of closing loss-making installations dealt a heavy blow to the sector as a whole, and HVL ceased its activity at Matallana de Torío and subsequently also at Hullas de Sabero.

The company entered the 21st century based on its "Nueva Mina" (New Mine) project, a modern 12.7 km² operation with an investment of 270 million euros and coal reserves calculated to last until 2025.

On 28 October 2013, the company suffered one of the most serious accidents in its modern history, when a firedamp gas escape occurred at the Pozo Emilio del Valle shaft in Santa Lucía de Gordón, in León, killing six miners and seriously injuring five others.

On 1 January 2019 it ceased its coal extraction activity after more than a century of operations, as a consequence of policies aimed at reducing dependence on coal as an energy source.

== HVL Foundation ==
In 1995, the company created the Fundación Hullera Vasco-Leonesa (Hullera Vasco-Leonesa Foundation), a cultural project aimed at managing the company's documentary heritage, promoting the culture and heritage of León and its province, publishing books, and managing the vocational training school it owns in La Robla.
