= Transcantábrico =

Narrow-gauge tourist train service in Spain

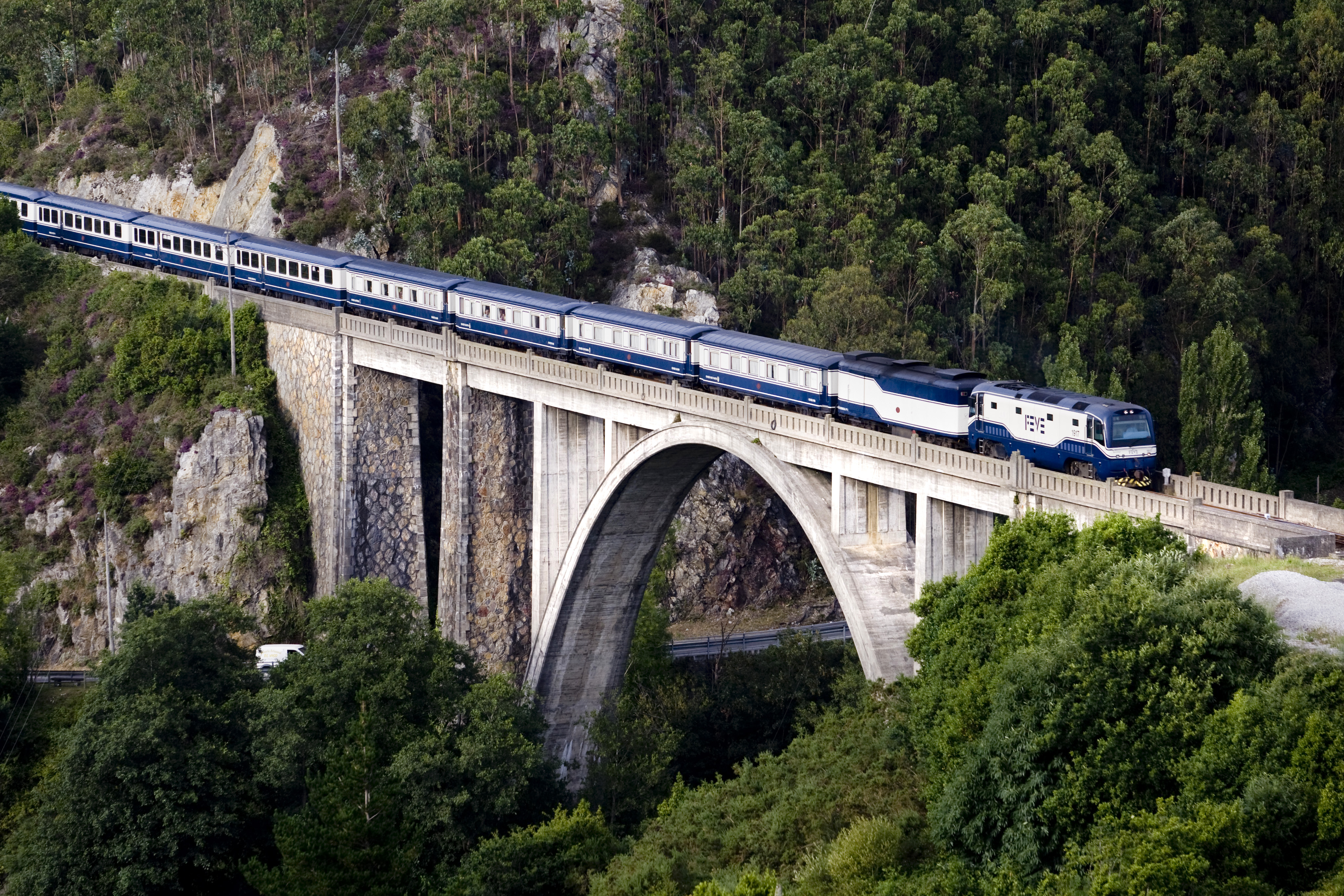
- Transcantábrico over a viaduct in Luarca

Overview
- Service type: Tourist heritage train
- Status: Operating
- Locale: Northern coast of Spain
- First service: 30 July 1983
- Current operator: Renfe
- Former operator: FEVE (1983–2012)
- Website: Official website

Route
- Termini: Bilbao-Concordia; Ferrol

On-board services
- Classes: Gran Lujo; Clásico
- Sleeping arrangements: Sleeping cars with suites and bathroom
- Catering facilities: Dining car

Technical
- Track gauge: Metre-gauge
- Track owner: ADIF

The Transcantábrico is a metre-gauge tourist train service, crossing northern Spain along the Bay of Biscay. It is the oldest of Spain's tourist trains, managed by the Spanish public company FEVE since its inauguration in 1983 until 2012, when FEVE disappeared and Renfe Operadora took over.

== History ==
With the Transcantábrico, FEVE (Narrow Gauge Railways) created the first hotel-train in Spain. The original idea was to create a tourist train, emulating the legendary Orient Express, which would use FEVE's tracks in northern Spain. The special feature of this train is that, unlike other tourist trains in Europe, it operates on 1,000 mm (3 ft 3 3/8 in) gauge track.

It opened for business on 30 July 1983 with an inaugural trip between La Robla and Cistierna in Leon. Its original composition was three Pullman lounge cars built in the UK in 1923 (pub, bar and lounge), 4 bunk bed cars, a generator car and a service car for the crew.

As of 2015 there are 2 trains, the Classic and the Luxury. T

The Society of International Railway Travelers has included it in its list of the top 25 trains in the world as recently as 2026.

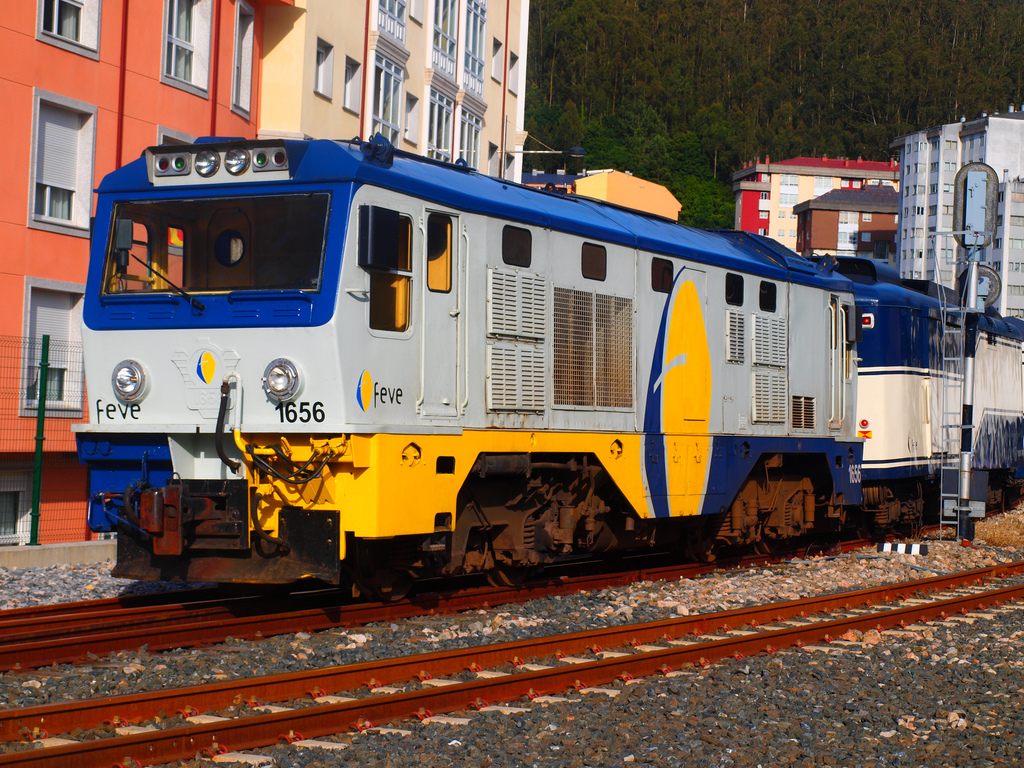
A FEVE 1600 Series locomotive at Viveiro

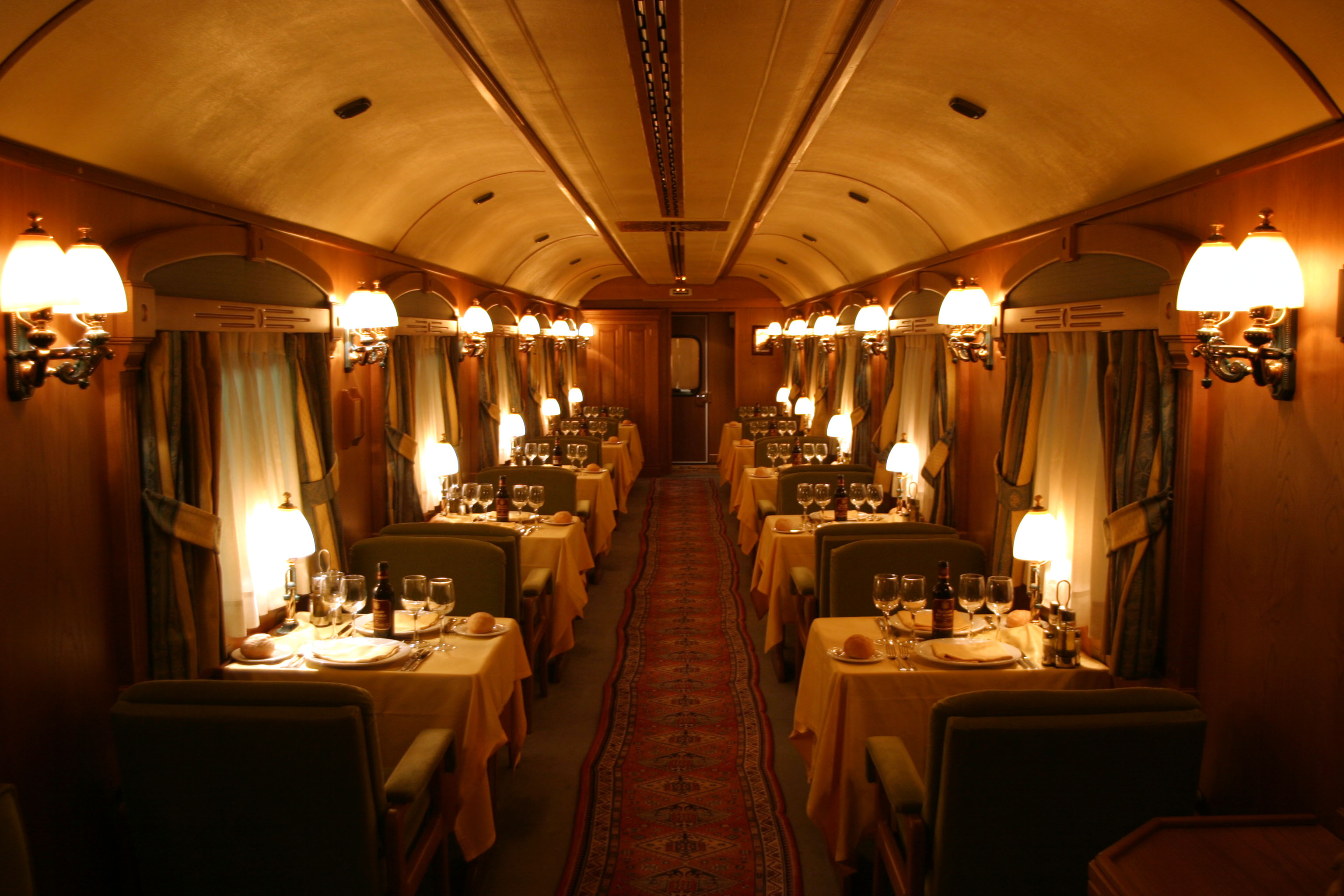
Transcantábrico dining car

== Itinerary ==
During the first years, it travelled between Leon and Ferrol (through Bilbao), until the closure of the Leon - Bilbao (La Robla railway) line, when it then travelled between Bilbao and Ferrol. After the reopening of the La Robla line in 2003, it returned to original route. In 2009 new special services were introduced from San Sebastián to Santiago de Compostela and from 2010 services were made regular to/from San Sebastian using this Basque Railway Network from Basauri.

Since 2000 it is officially called Transcantábrico Grand Luxury, while a second luxury train called Costa Verde Express (formerly Transcantábrico Classic) was established.

The trains can also be hired for charter trips, adapted to clients, for groups and companies for incentives, conferences and exhibitions.

== Facilities and services ==
The current train composition is four saloon cars, seven sleeping cars, a generator wagon and a service car for the crew. The original bunk cabins have been replaced by suites equipped with bedroom and bathroom, a double bed, wardroom, bag storage, desk, safe, adjustable climate control, in-room music, telephone, minibar, and a bathroom with hairdryer and hydromassage shower/steam sauna.

The luxury train composition is similar except that passenger capacity is halved, with rooms much larger than the Classic, with a living area apart from the bedroom, a two-metre double bed or twin beds, a sofa that converts into a double bed in the living room, flatscreen TV and a computer with free Internet connection.

Its lounges and suites combine early 20th-century charm with modern comforts such as Wi-Fi and flatscreen TV.

The original 1923 Pullman cars are authentic jewels of historical and railway heritage, and are used for serving onboard à la carte breakfasts and meals; the bar car is permanently open; other areas include tea lounges, the panoramic view car or the pub car, where parties, music or live shows are offered every night. All cars are interconnected, so travellers can move freely between them and their accommodation units.

Both in the train's lounges and in the renowned restaurants along the route, the gastronomic offer is handled by kitchens and chefs from northern Spain.

The crew is headed by an expedition leader and includes a guide, the head waiter, waiters, music entertainer, cleaners, security, train driver, bus driver and rail technicians. The guide accompanies travellers on all visits and restaurants. In addition it offers guests national, international and local press.

In 2010, FEVE renovated the Transcantábrico consist during the locomotives' service; the carriages were completely dismantled and rebuilt with new electrical systems, air conditioning, and plumbing. FEVE had invested €2,500,000 (equivalent to US$4,100,000 in 2025) in renovating the consist. The original, four-compartment carriages were rebuilt into two-compartment "Privilege" suites, which featured double beds, televisions, personal computers, and a shower fitted with a sauna. Following the implementation of the new suites, the train was sold out long before it began service. As a result, FEVE replaced one of their consists with only "Privilege" suites, reducing the maximum occupancy of the train from 54 to 28, but maintaining the same revenue due to the higher fare for the new carriages. The new consist would become the Transcantábrico Gran Lujo. A diesel-powered generator car was added to the consist to power the utilities in the renovated carriages. The generator car consumes from 800 to 1,000 liters of diesel fuel during one trip, so both the locomotive and the generator car are refueled at stops.
