= Arija =

- Municipality and town
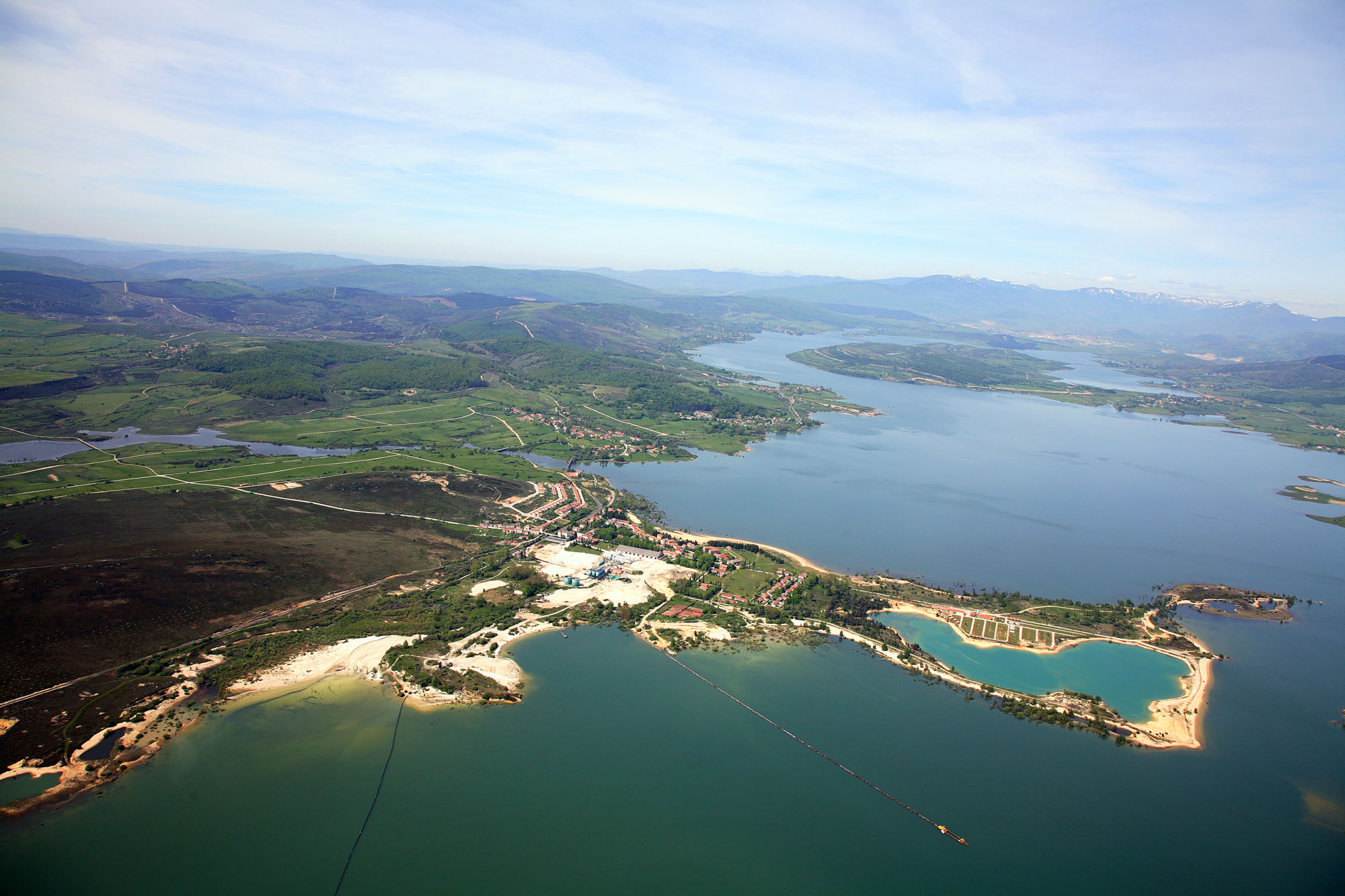
- Aerial view of Arija, 2006

- Flag Coat of arms

- Location within Castile and León Location within Spain
- Coordinates: 42°59.65′N 3°56.68′W
- Country: Spain
- Autonomous community: Castile and León
- Province: Burgos
- Comarca: Las Merindades

Government
  - Mayor: Pedro Saiz Peña (PP)

Area
  - Total: 7.02 km^{2} (2.71 sq mi)
- Elevation: 842 m (2,762 ft)

Population (2025-01-01)
  - Total: 115
  - Density: 16.4/km^{2} (42.4/sq mi)
- Time zone: UTC+1 (CET)
  - Summer (DST): UTC+2 (CEST)
- Postal code: 09570
- Website: http://www.arija.es/

Arija is a small town and municipality in the province of Burgos, located to the north of the provincial capital Burgos, in the autonomous community of Castile-Leon, Spain. The town's history dates back more than thousand years. Is divided into 'neighborhood above' and 'neighborhood below' or 'Vilga'. It consisted of the Santa Gadea de Alfoz.

The recent history of Arija is linked to the factory of Cristalería Española S.A., that in 1906 settled in the lands of Arija. A French company of the Saint-Gobain Emporium, founded in 1665 by royal privilege of Luis XIV, was specialized in the manufacture of flat glass. This town is now situated on de artificial lake of "Embalse del Ebro" when the Ebro river was dammed.
