= Bercedo =

- Municipality
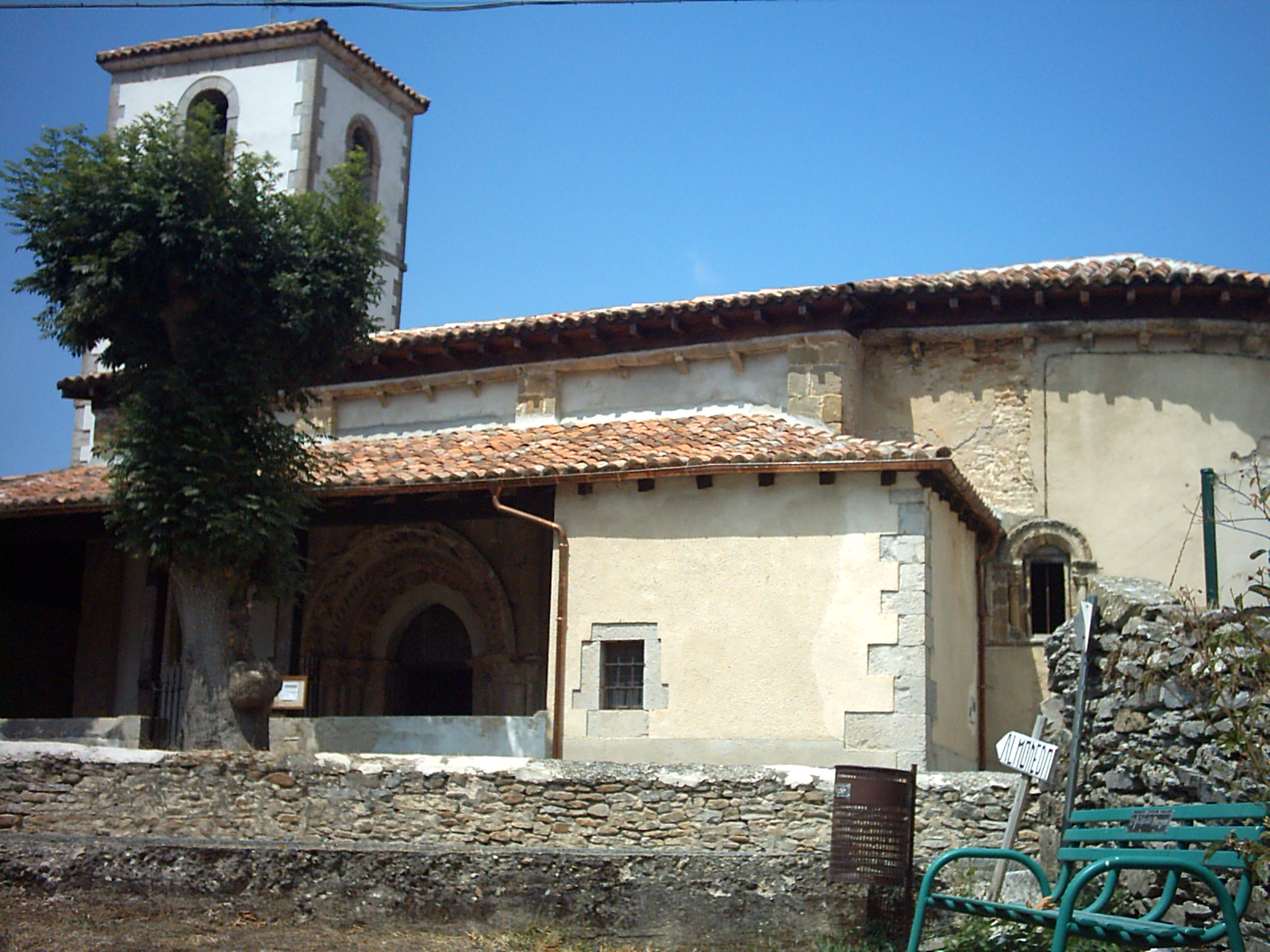
- Church of Sant Michel Archangel
- Interactive map of Bercedo
- Coordinates: +43.084188114637584°N 3.452157841019758°W
- Country: Spain
- Autonomous community: Castile and León
- Province: Burgos
- Comarca: Las Merindades
- Seat: Villasante de Montija
- Elevation: 740 m (2,430 ft)

Population (2024)
  - Total: 77
- Time zone: UTC+1 (CET)
  - Summer (DST): CEST
- Postal code: 09569

Bercedo is a Spanish town of Provincia de Burgos of Merindad de Montija, Castilla la Vieja, in the Autonomous Community of Castilla y León.

Its Romanesque church is dedicated to St Michael the Archangel. It was built in the 12th century, has a single nave, semicircular apse decorated with windows and a doorway with three archivolts, columns and capitals.

== Neighbouring localities ==
Bercedo borders with the following localities:

- North with Agüera.
- East with Leciñana de Mena.
- South with Lastras de las Eras.
- Southwest with Quintanilla Sopeña and Villasante.
- West with Noceco.

== Demographics ==
Population development

List of cities by population
City	Population

== History ==
Bercedo lies on a crossing of ancient Roman roads with one leading North to Falviobriga, modern day Castro Urdiales. In nearby Agüera and Villasante shoes of that era are preserved. Castilian wool travelled on the road through Bercedo to the port of Laredo.

This is how Bercedo was described in the middle of the 19th century, in volume IV of the Dictionary of Spain and its Overseas Possessions, a work promoted by Pascual Madoz :

'Place in the province, diocese, territorial audience and general captaincy of Burgos (17 leagues), judicial party of Villarcayo de Merindad de Castilla la Vieja(3 ¾), town hall of Villasante, Merindad de Montijo, with 2 aldermen and a faithful of dates for his interior government. Located at 14° 26′ longitude and at 43° 37′ latitude in an extensive plain at three quarter of an hour of the mountain range, which divides the valleys of Montija and Mena from those of Soba and Carranza, its height being at 2,704 feet above sea level; The winds fight it and its climate is quite healthy. It consists of 60 houses, from 18 to 26 feet, with high floors, forming the core of the population, and some poorly paved and dirty streets; there is an elementary school attended by 30 or 40 children of both sexes; a parish church named Santa Marina on which those of Quintanilla Sopña and Villasorda depend, served by a parish priest provided by the Archbishop of Burgos, in patrimonial; a cemetery, and a source of good and abundant water for domestic uses. It borders to the North on Laya and San Pelaya; to the East Cadagua; to the South Quintanilla Sopeña, and to the West Nocedo, all distant from about a half to three quarter of a league; in the mountains there are some huts of pasiegos who inhabit them only in the summer, as snow does not allow them to do so in the winter. The soil cover is thin and sandy; the part intended for cultivation is divided into 3 lots, comprising 250 bushes of the first, 300 of the second and 450 of the third; the rest is populated with oaks, beeches, shrubs, oaks and abundant pastures; it is irrigated by the waters of the river Caneja that passes immediately by the village in a direction from N to S, to join the river Trueba, 2 leagues away; it has a stone bridge with 3 arches of 20 feet height and 30 feet in diameter, on which the new road from Bercedo to Burgos runs, the only one passable on wheels. Production: wheat, rye, maize, barley, pulses and flax; sheep, goats, cattle, horses and mules; hares, partridges, wild boar, horse, roe deer, foxes, wolves and bears; the inhabitants are exclusively engaged in agriculture; cattle are also extracted, and wheat, wine, oil and clothing are imported. Population: 12 neighbors, 44 souls. Productive capital: 275,000. Taxable: 26,915. Contribution: with the municipality (V.). This consists of the rent of the tavern and bakery; an inheritance of 7 bushels of seed, an extensive common land to the site of the Ayal and the house of loma, and also in community with all the Merindad of Montija, another site known by the Sierra, of 4 leagues of extension, populated with shrubs, beeches, oaks and some meadows.'

— Geographical-statistical-historical dictionary of Spain and its overseas possessions
