= Valdepiélago =

Coordinates: 42°52′N 5°24′W

Valdepiélago, Spain
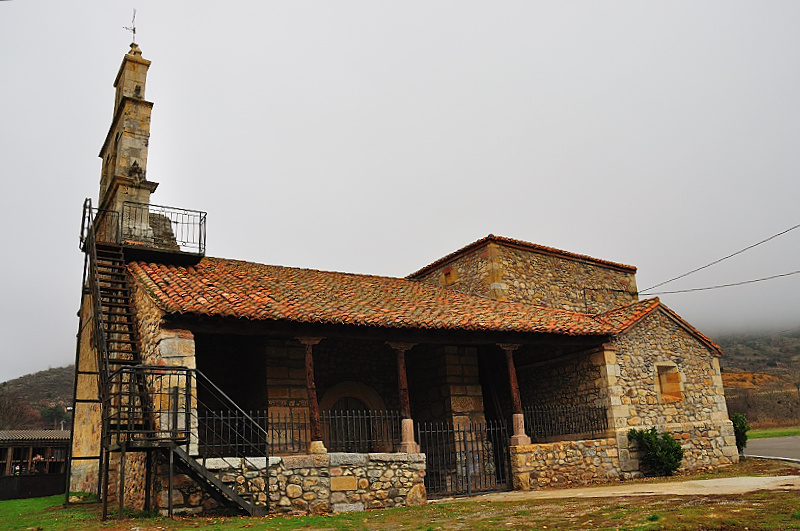
- Church of Valdepiélago

- Flag Coat of arms
- Interactive map of Valdepiélago, Spain
- Country: Spain
- Autonomous community: Castile and León
- Province: León
- Municipality: Valdepiélago

Area
  - Total: 56 km^{2} (22 sq mi)

Population (2025-01-01)
  - Total: 306
  - Density: 5.5/km^{2} (14/sq mi)
- Time zone: UTC+1 (CET)
  - Summer (DST): UTC+2 (CEST)

Valdepiélago is a municipality located in the province of León, Castile and León, Spain. According to the 2004 census (INE), the municipality has a population of 422 inhabitants.
