= Cistierna =

Cistierna, Spain
- Flag Coat of arms

- Location within Spain
- Coordinates: 42°48′10″N 5°7′31″W
- Country: Spain
- Autonomous community: Castile and León
- Province: León
- Municipality: Cistierna

Government
  - Mayor: Luis Mariano Santos (UPL)

Area
  - Total: 97.61 km^{2} (37.69 sq mi)
- Elevation: 939 m (3,081 ft)

Population (2025-01-01)
  - Total: 2,857
  - Density: 29.27/km^{2} (75.81/sq mi)
- Demonym: cisterniense
- Time zone: UTC+1 (CET)
  - Summer (DST): UTC+2 (CEST)
- Postal Code: 24800
- Telephone prefix: 987
- Website: Ayto. de Cistierna

Cistierna (Spanish pronunciation: [θisˈtjeɾna]) is a municipality located in the province of León, Castile and León, Spain. According to the 2019 census (INE), the municipality had a population of 3,135 inhabitants.

== See also ==
- Kingdom of León
- Leonese language
- Llión
