= Matallana de Torío =

Coordinates: 42°52′N 5°31′W

Matallana de Torío, Spain
- Flag Coat of arms
- Interactive map of Matallana de Torío, Spain
- Country: Spain
- Autonomous community: Castile and León
- Province: León
- Municipality: Matallana de Torío

Area
  - Total: 73.45 km^{2} (28.36 sq mi)
- Elevation: 1,022 m (3,353 ft)

Population (2025-01-01)
  - Total: 1,214
  - Density: 16.53/km^{2} (42.81/sq mi)
- Time zone: UTC+1 (CET)
  - Summer (DST): UTC+2 (CEST)

Matallana de Torío (Matachana de Toríu in Leonese language) is a municipality located in the province of León, Castile and León, Spain. According to the 2025 census (INE), the municipality had a population of 1,214 inhabitants.

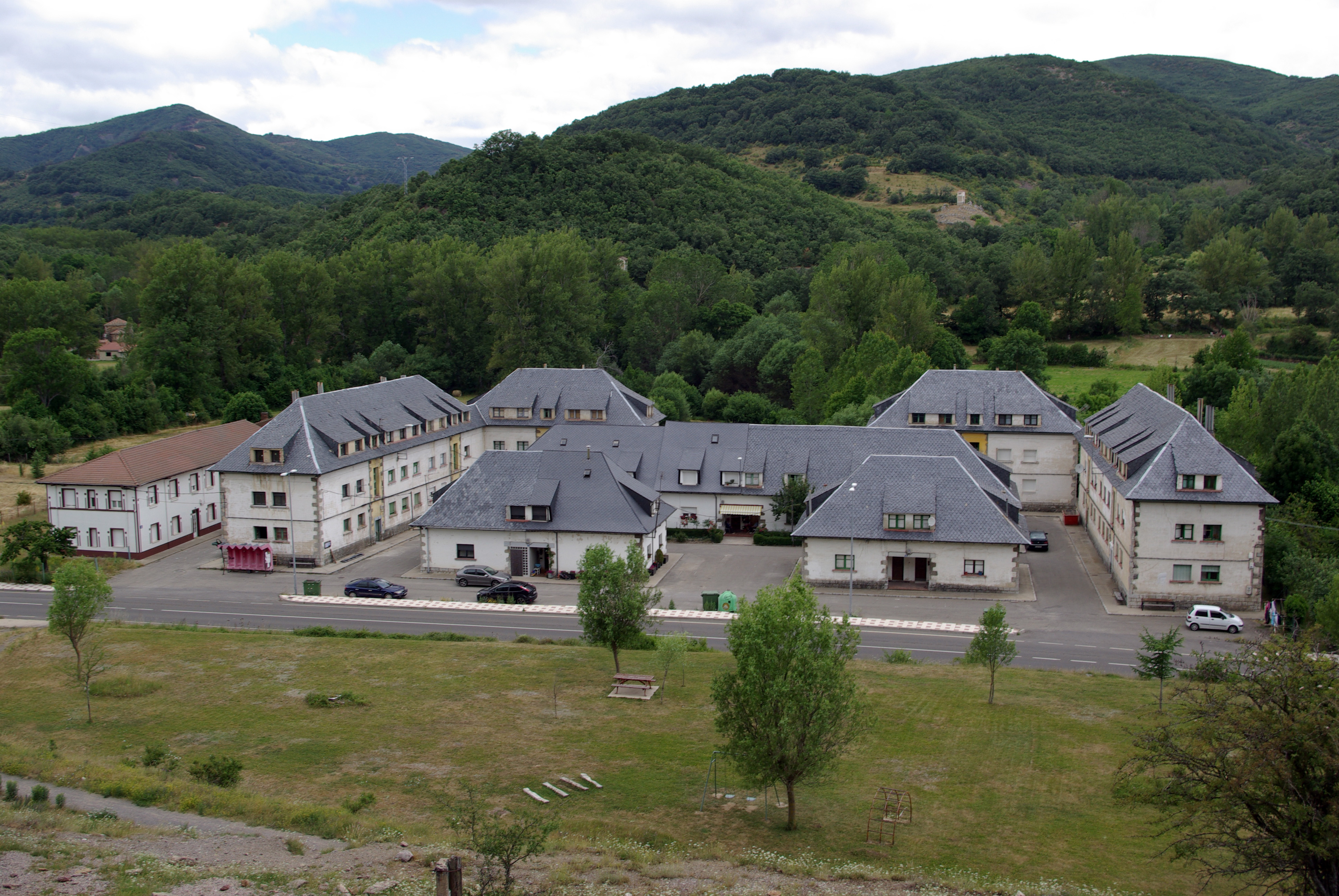
Matallana de Torío Neighbourhood
