= Montaña Palentina =

Natural comarca of the province of Palencia, in Castilla and León, Spain

- Comarca
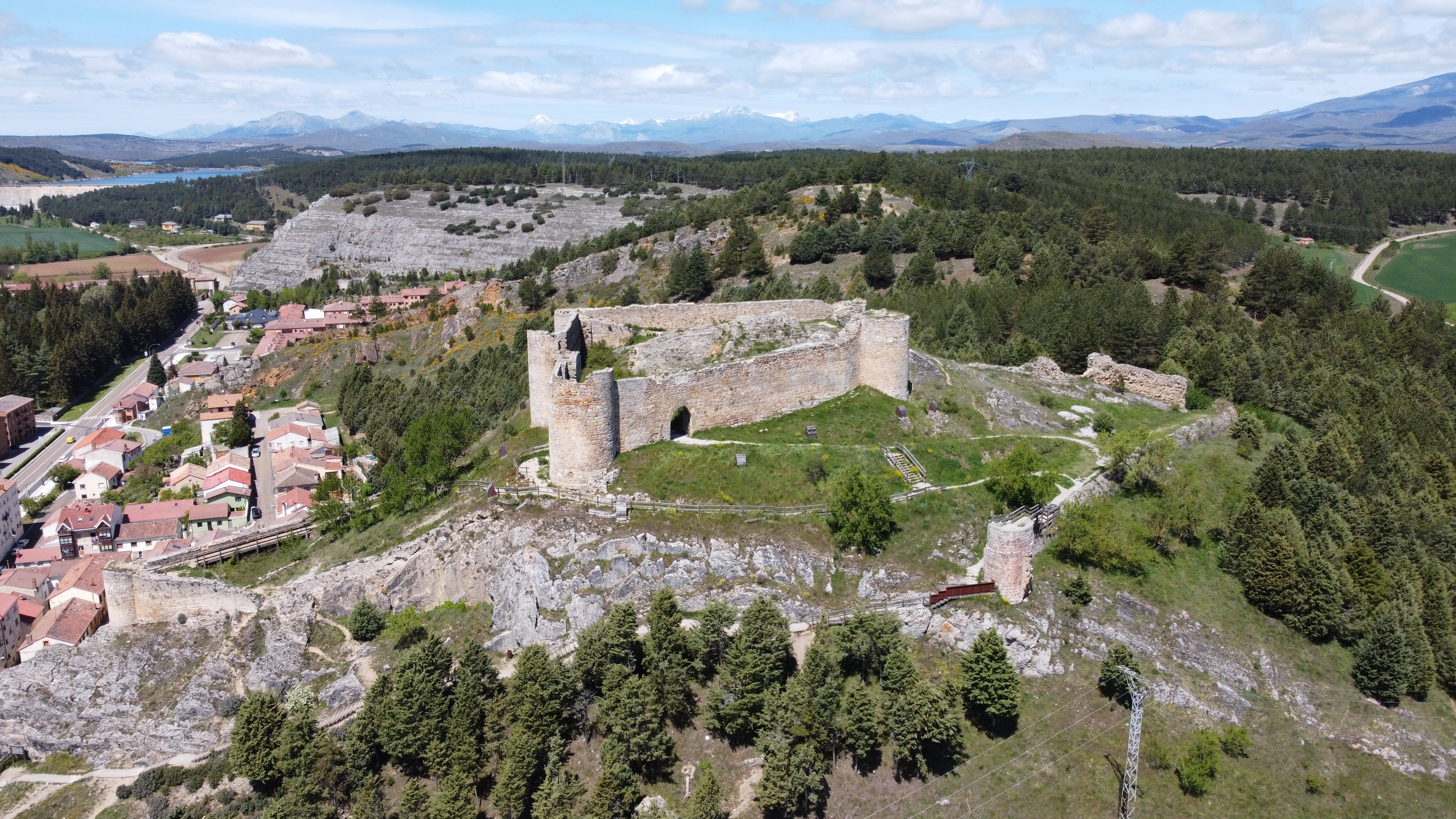
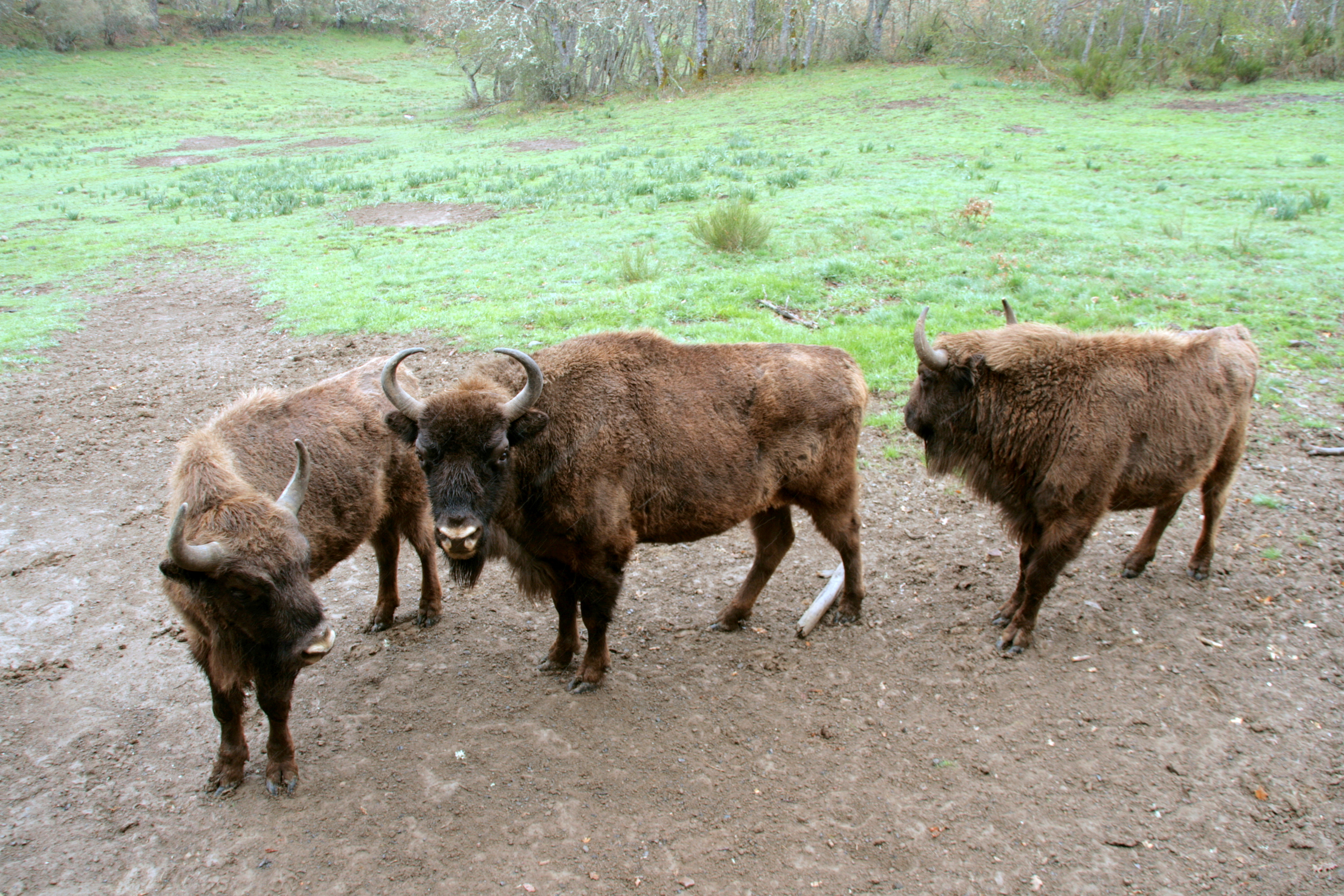
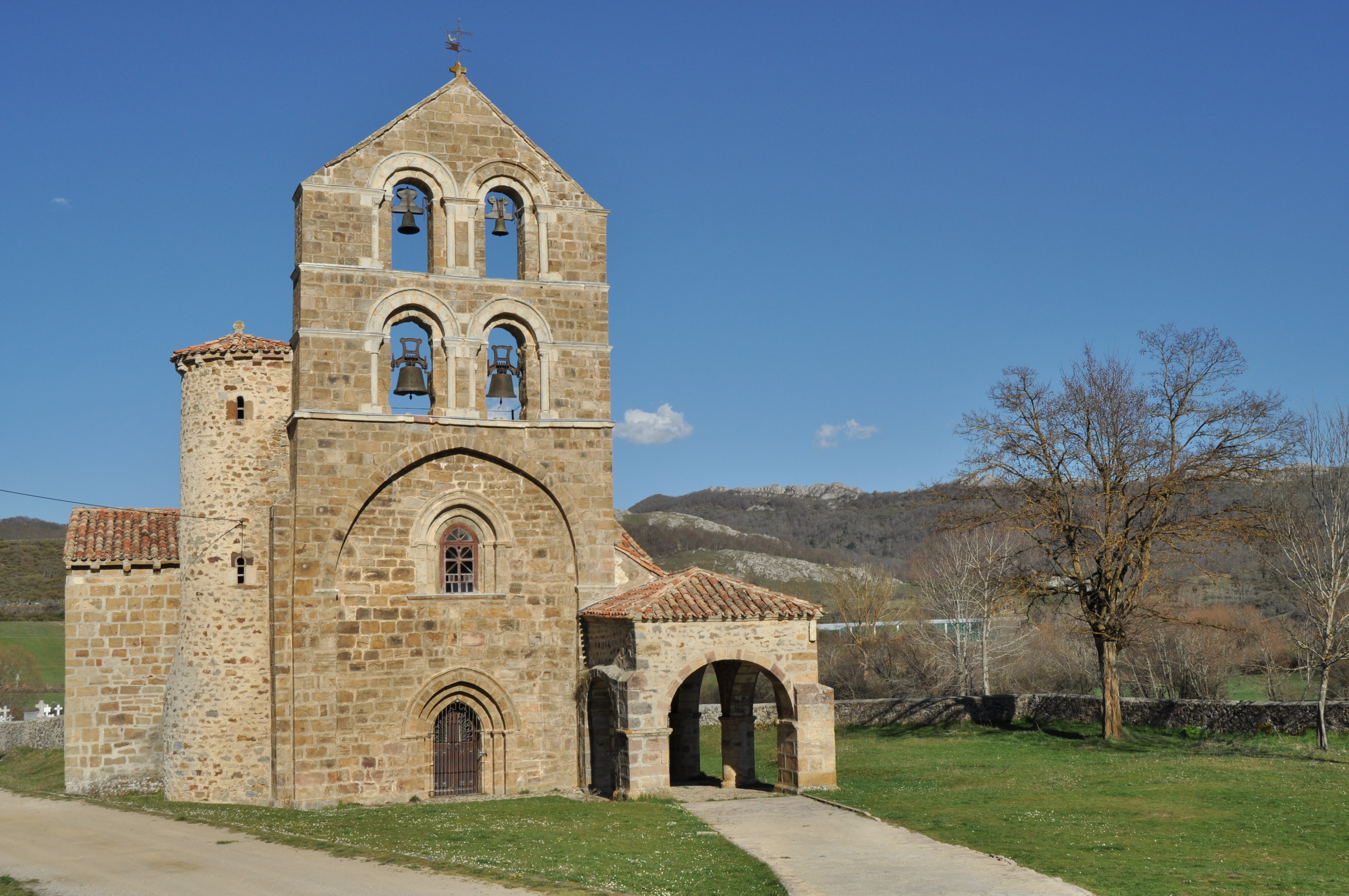
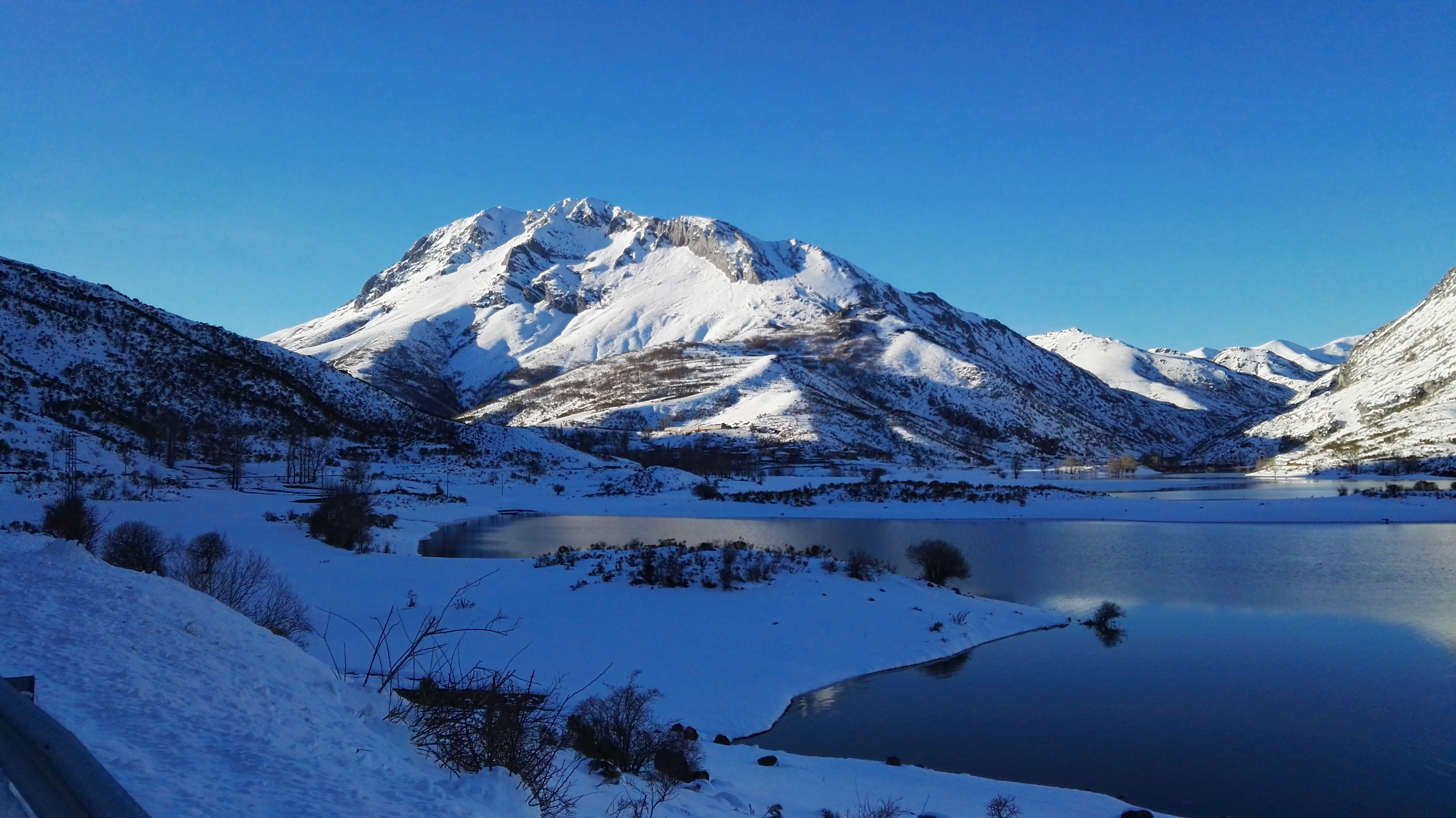
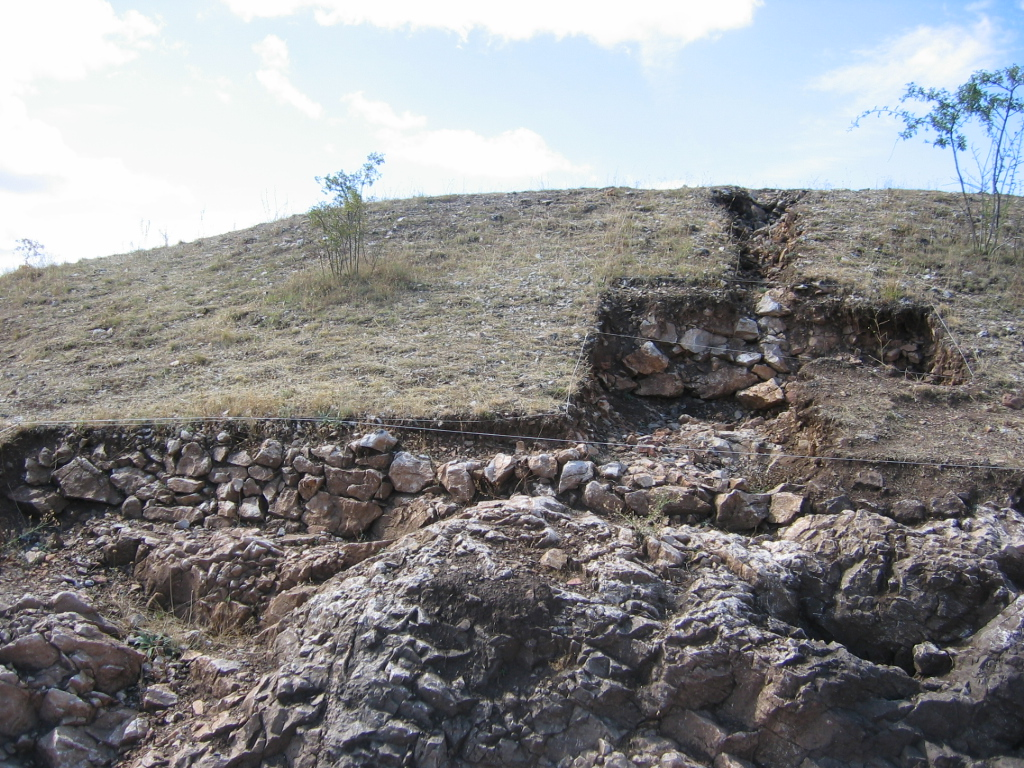
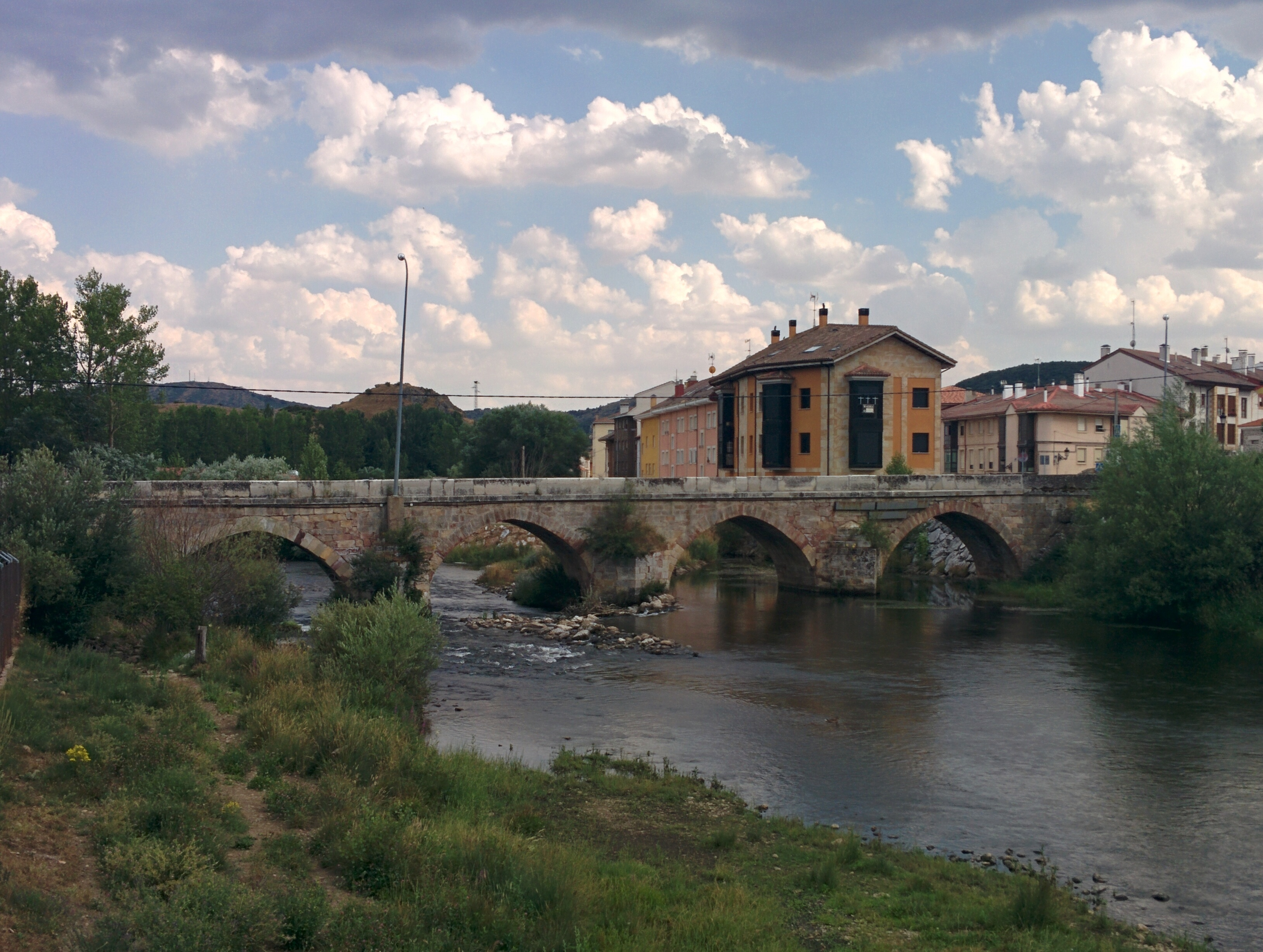
- From left to right and top to bottom: Aguilar de Campoo, Nature Reserve of the European Bison, Collegiate Church of San Salvador, Pico Espigüete, Castro de la Loma, and Cervera de Pisuerga.

- Montaña Palentina in the province of Palencia.
- Country: Spain
- Autonomous community: Castile and León
- Province: Province of Palencia
- Municipalities: 18 municipalities

Population (2021)
  - Total: 20,968
- Most populated municipality: Aguilar de Campoo
- Least populated municipality: Cervera de Pisuerga
- Source: INE (01-01-2020)

Montaña Palentina is a comarca in the province of Palencia, in Castile and León, in Spain. It is the sub-provincial division used by the Deputation of Palencia in its publications, although it does not correspond to the natural comarca, as it does not include La Valdivia, in the east.

It has a population of 20,968 inhabitants. Aguilar de Campoo is the most populated urban area, with around 6,806 inhabitants.

== Geography ==
The comarca of Montaña is geographically unified due to its rugged nature, although traditionally communications have not been easy between the different sectors for the same reason. The name refers to its belonging to an administrative unit, the province of Palencia, although the great distance from the capital and the difference with the rest of the regions of this province make it a singular unit.

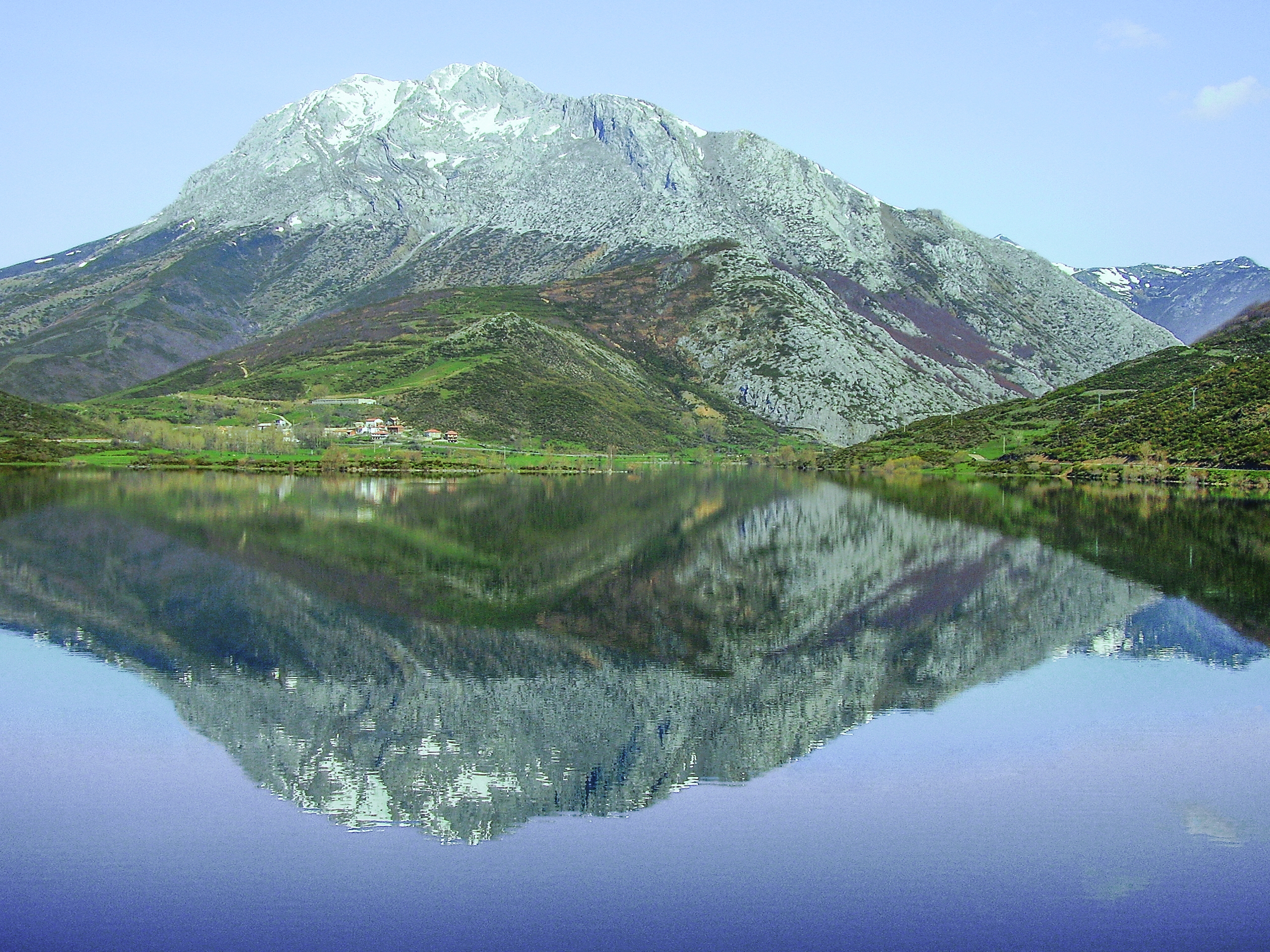
Espigüete, one of the most highest peaks of Montaña Palentina, with its 2450 m. above sea level.

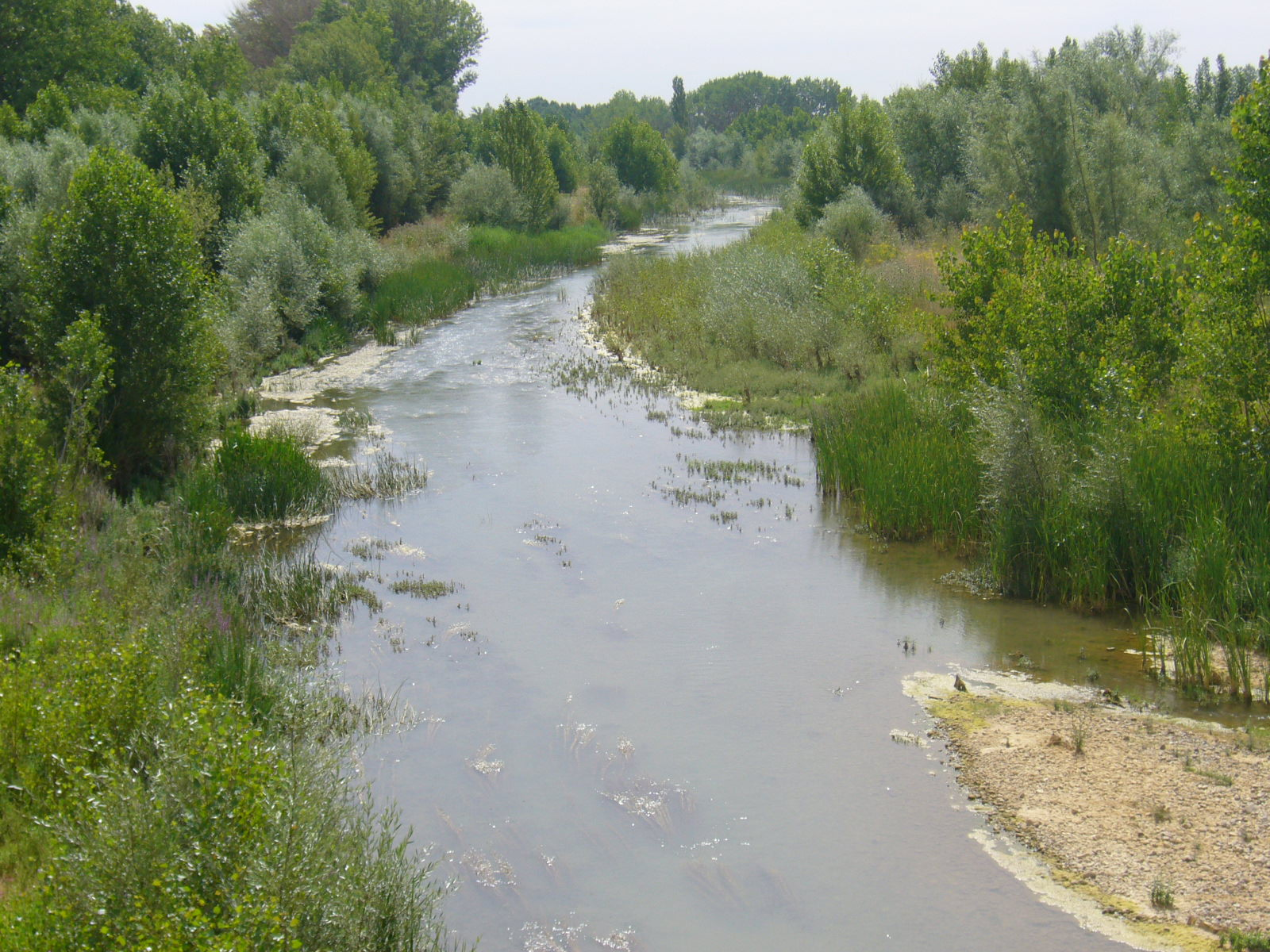
River Valdavia, one of the many that irrigate the region.

Montaña Palentina has a natural environment of great environmental and scenic quality that is preserved, in a large part of the surface, under three figures of protection: Montaña Palentina Natural Park, Covalagua Natural Area and the Natural Area of Las Tuerces.

The landscape and ethnographic characteristics make it very attractive as an example of tourism in rural areas. In recent years it has been provided with consolidated tourist resources and infrastructure and is committed to continuing to consider tourism as one of the strategic elements for revitalising this territory, without forgetting its integration into the rest of the region's economic activities.

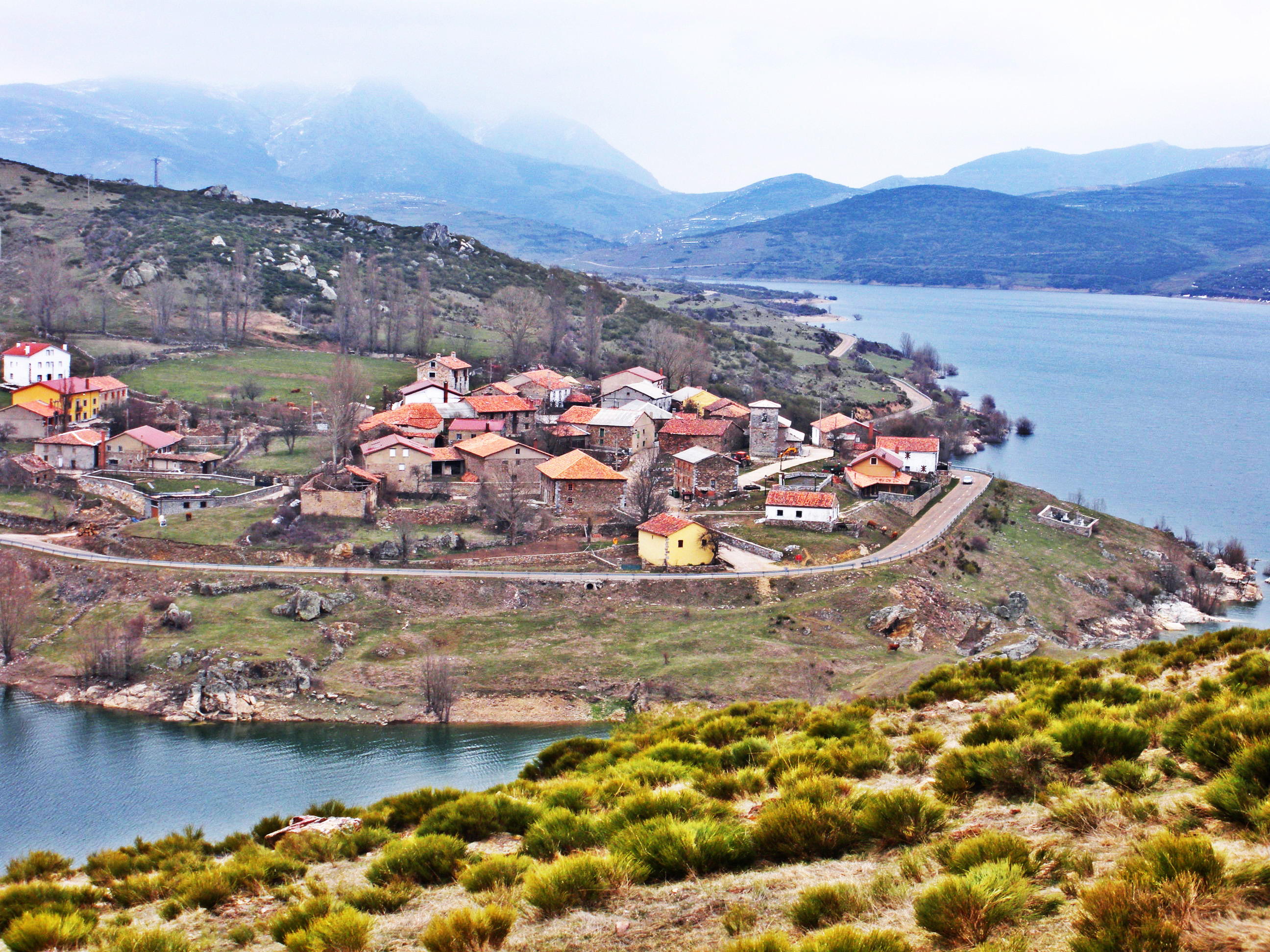
Alba de los Cardaños, a small mountain village located in the middle of the Ruta de los Pantanos (Marshes Route).

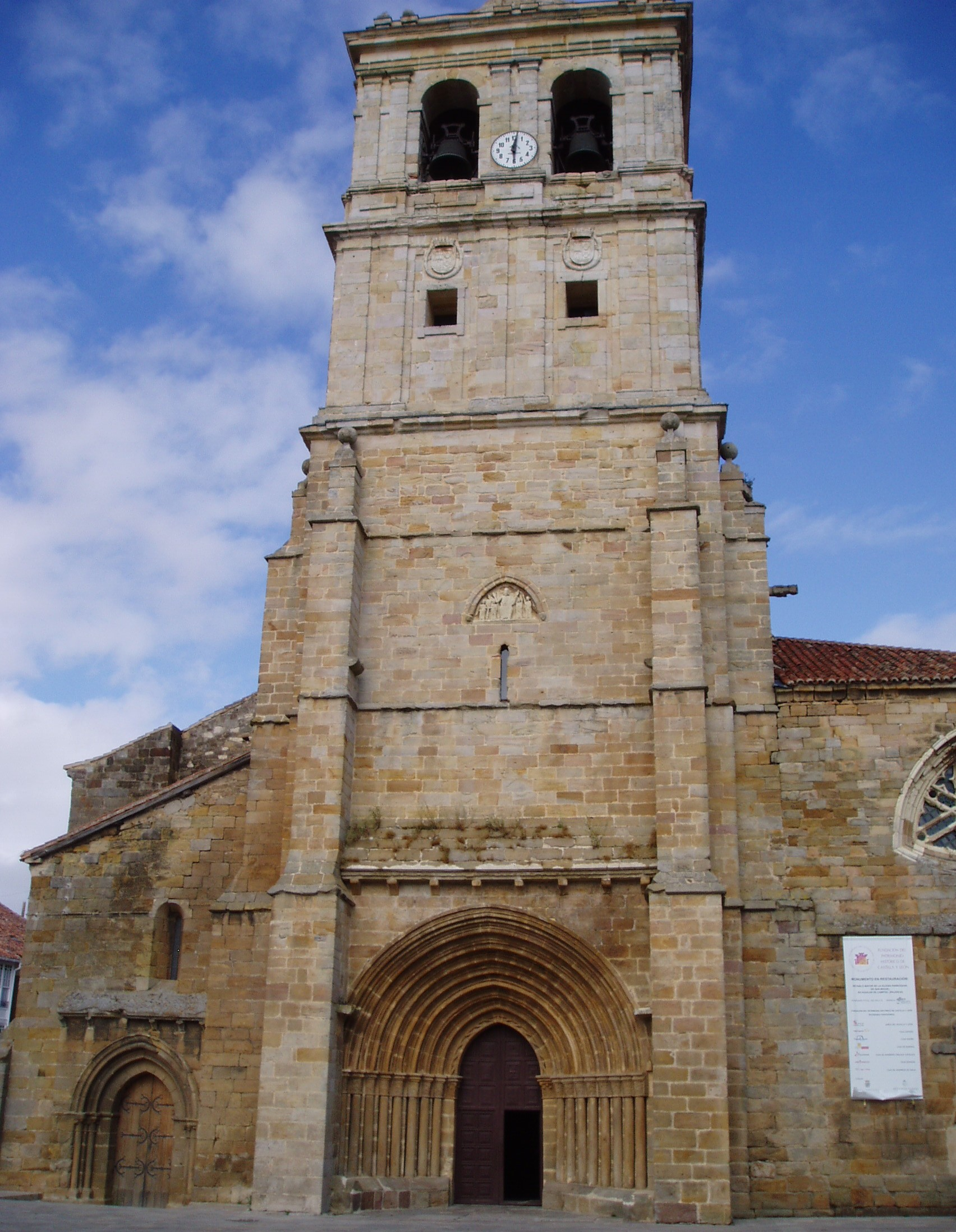
Collegiate Church of San Miguel, in Aguilar de Campoo, a 14th-century Gothic temple.

Geographically located to the north of Palencia (about 100 km from the capital), it is one of the northernmost areas of Castile.

It is bordered to the west by the province of León, to the north by Cantabria, from which it is separated by Sierra de Híjar, Sierra de Albas and Curavacas Massif; to the east by Burgos and to the south by the Palencia region of Saldaña-Los Valles. Two sectors can be distinguished, Alto Pisuerga and Alto Carrión, although other sub-regions can also be mentioned, such as Fuentes Carrionas, La Pernía, La Braña, Campoo and Valdivia.

The highest elevations of the entire Cantabrian mountain range (excluding the Picos de Europa massif) are located here: Peña Prieta (2538 m), Curavacas (2524 m) and Espigüete (2450 m).

The waters collected by these mountains give rise to the source of the two rivers whose valleys run parallel to the south of the province: Pisuerga, to the east, and Carrión, to the west, which let their waters rest in the reservoirs of Requejada, Aguilar and Ruesga, and in those of Camporredondo and Compuerto, respectively, forming between them the tourist route of the Ruta de los Pantanos.

This region forms part of the Cantabrian mountain range, and is located on its southern edge, which makes it a transitional area between two geomorphological units: the Atlantic mountains and the plains of the sedimentary basin of the Douro.

== Municipalities ==
The region is made up of 18 municipalities with 158 population centres.

The municipalities and their population are as follows:

Municipality	Population
Aguilar de Campoo	6842
Barruelo de Santullán	1183
Berzosilla	41
Brañosera	246
Castrejón de la Peña	360
Cervera de Pisuerga	2316
Dehesa de Montejo	136
Guardo	6153
La Pernía	320
Mudá	82
Polentinos	42
Pomar de Valdivia	463
Respenda de la Peña	154
Salinas de Pisuerga	317
San Cebrián de Mudá	162
Santibáñez de la Peña	1044
Triollo	64
Velilla del Río Carrión	1299
Total	21 224

== Fauna and flora ==
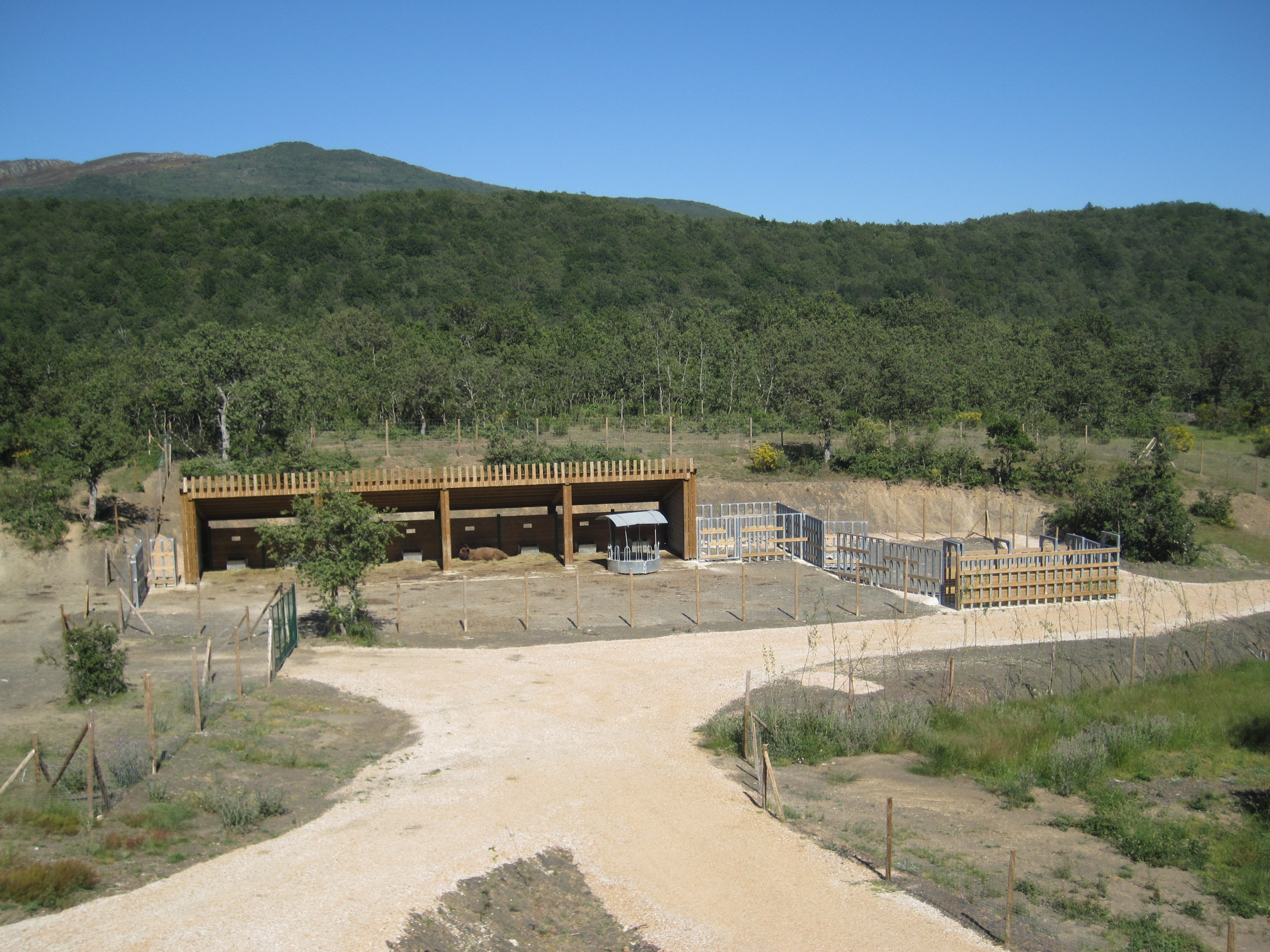
Part of the Nature Reserve of the European Bison in the Palencia town of San Cebrián de Mudá.

The forests are home to a rich array of species, including oak, beech, sessile pine, holly, yew, and more. The area boasts lots of pastureland, ideal for grazing, as well as rich communities of lichens and mosses, which ensure a plentiful supply of hunt. The rivers are known for their cleanliness and the quality of their trout fishing.

Among the notable large mammals in the area are deer, roe deer, wild boar, wolves, and brown bears. In June 2010, the municipality of San Cebrián de Mudá witnessed the introduction of seven European bison, comprising five females and two males, from Poland.

The topography of the region is characterised by the presence of mountain landscapes interspersed with lush valleys, including Castillería, San Quirce, Redondos, Santullán and Covalagua, which create a notable contrast with the strikingly shaped reliefs of Las Tuerces and Cañón de la Horadada.

== Demography ==
The figure of 16 inhabitants/km is very close to the depopulation threshold, to which are added worrying symptoms of ageing and sluggishness in a vegetative balance that is tending to fall.

== Economy ==
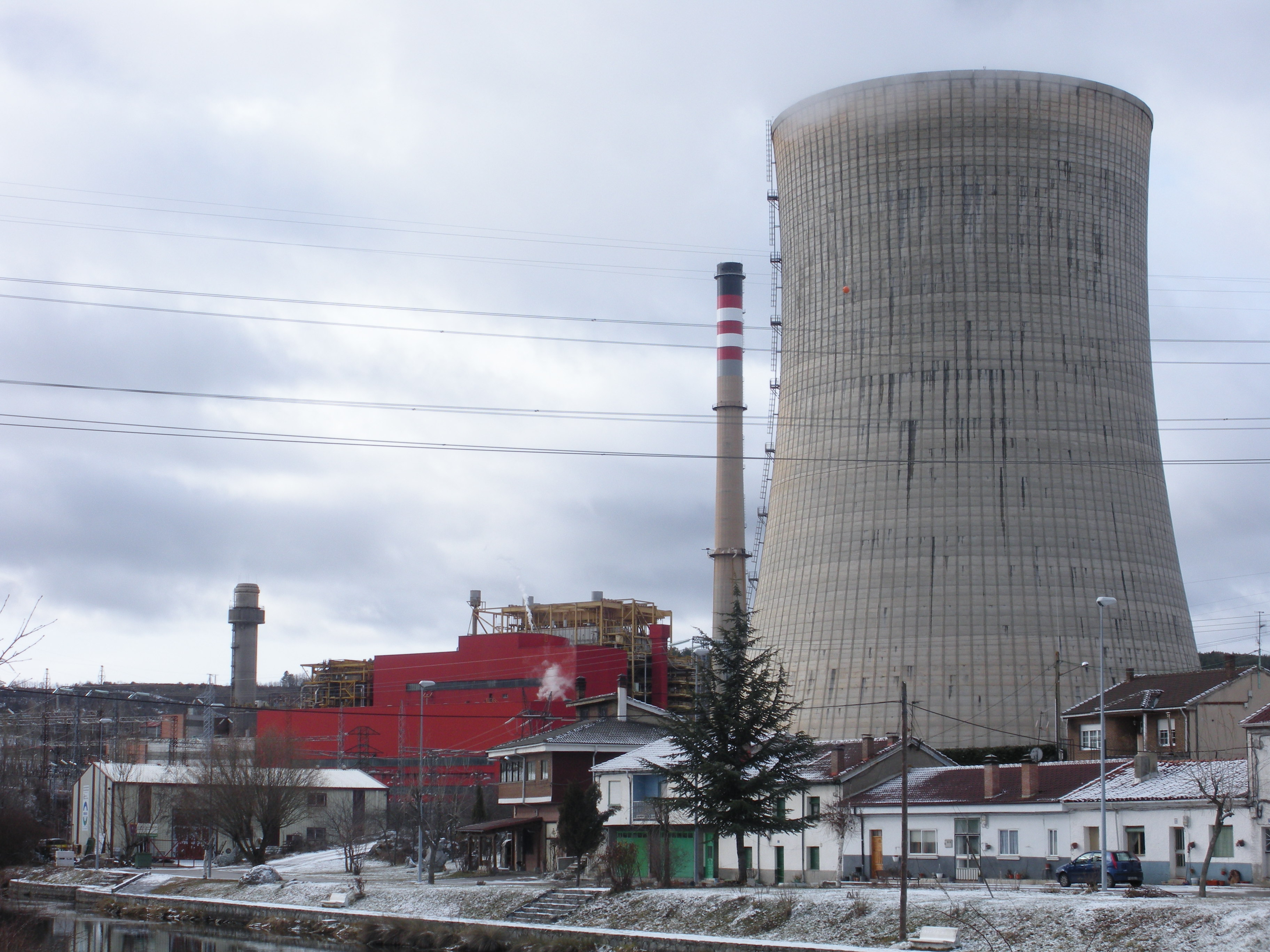
The Velilla Power Plant was one of the last major industries to be lost in the region.

Livestock farming and agriculture (albeit to a lesser extent) have historically been the dominant traditional activities.Towards the close of the 19th century, a period of sudden prosperity emerged in certain localities due to the advent of coal mining (the Palencia mining basin is entirely within the district), although this economic activity has since become virtually obsolete. The chemical and agri-food industries are also worthy of note, with the biscuit factories in Aguilar de Campoo (Galletas Gullón and Grupo Siro) being the most significant industry in the area.

Following the rural exodus and the development of new forms of economic organisation, these activities, with the exception of the aforementioned agri-food industry, have become less and less important, leading to crises in basic activities.

However, in the 1990s, the Montaña Palentina experienced a renaissance as an area of interest for rural tourism, driven by its natural environment and historical and artistic heritage, which was leveraged as a key economic resource.

The region participated in community initiatives supported by the European Union's rural development programmes, promoting tourism in this area.

== Tourism ==
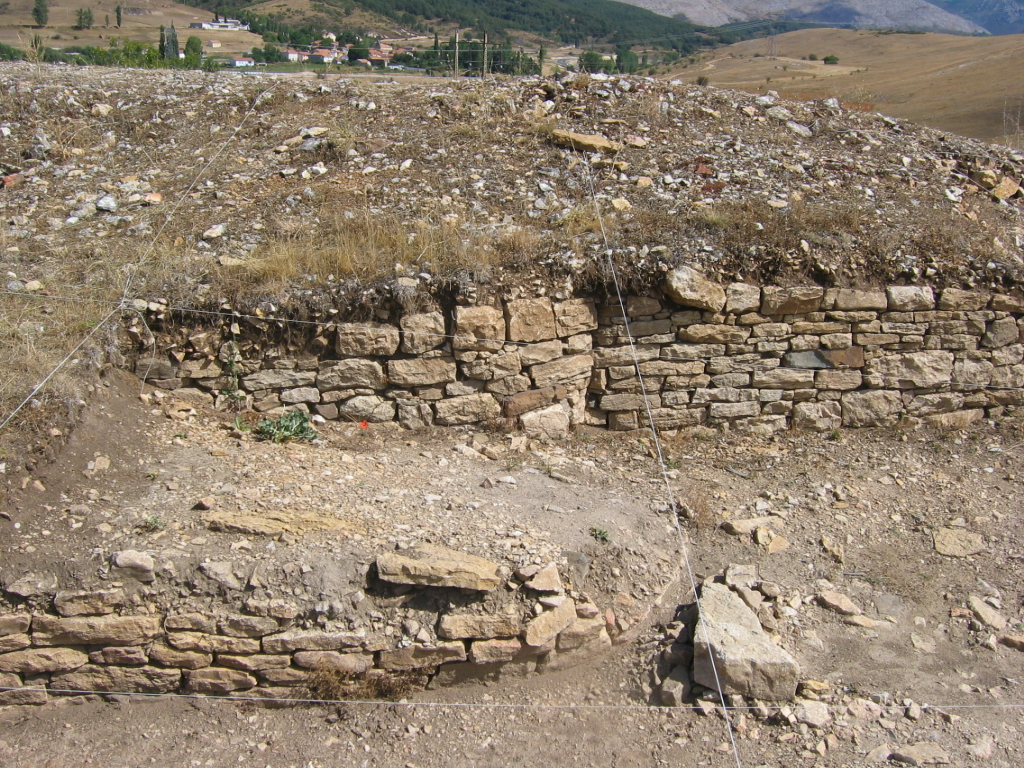
Remains of the Castro de la Loma, in Santibáñez de la Peña, a vestige of the presence of the Cantabri during the Iron Age.

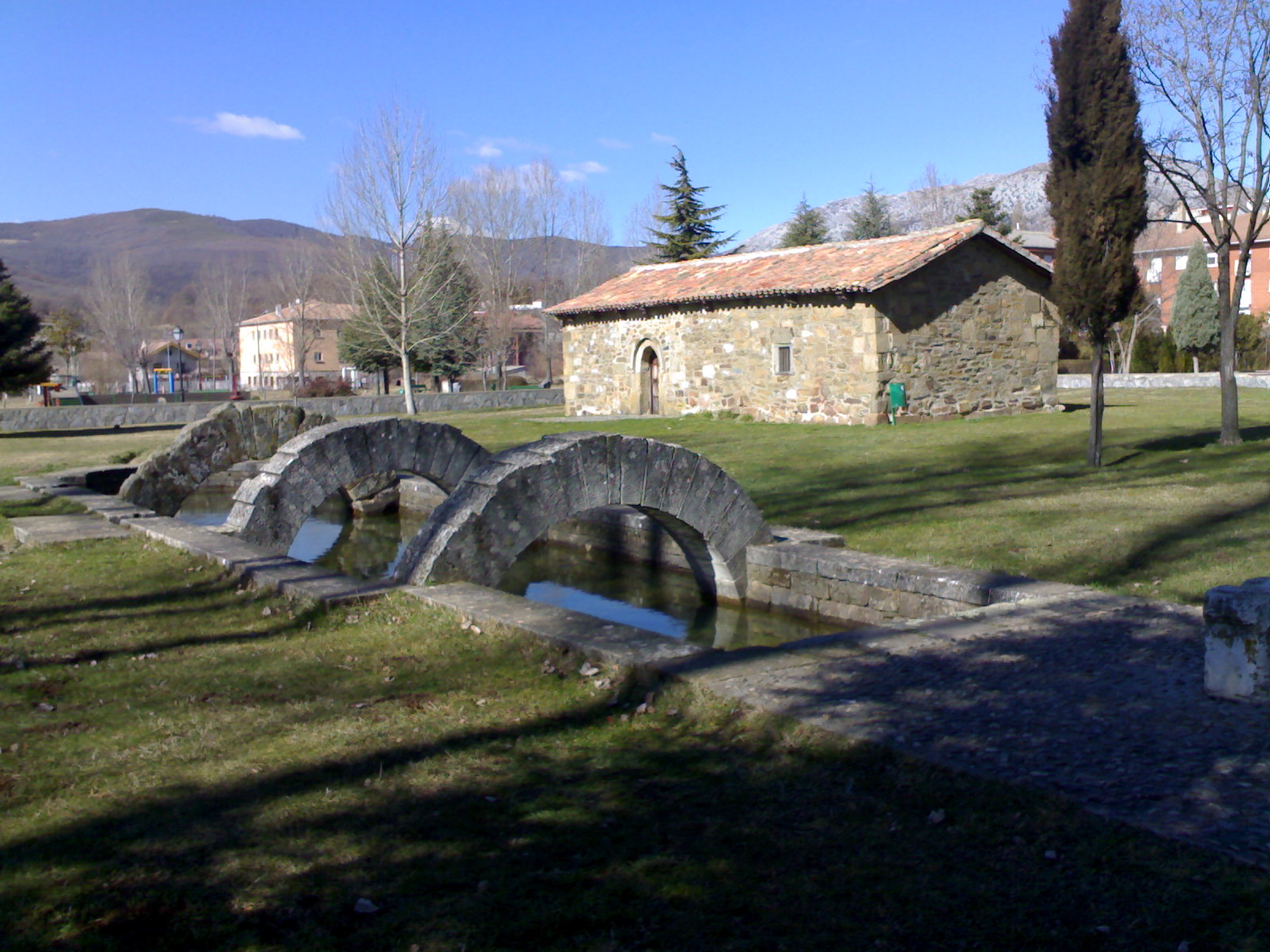
Fontes Tamarici, in Velilla del Río Carrión, one of the oracles cited by Pliny the Elder in his Naturalis Historiae.

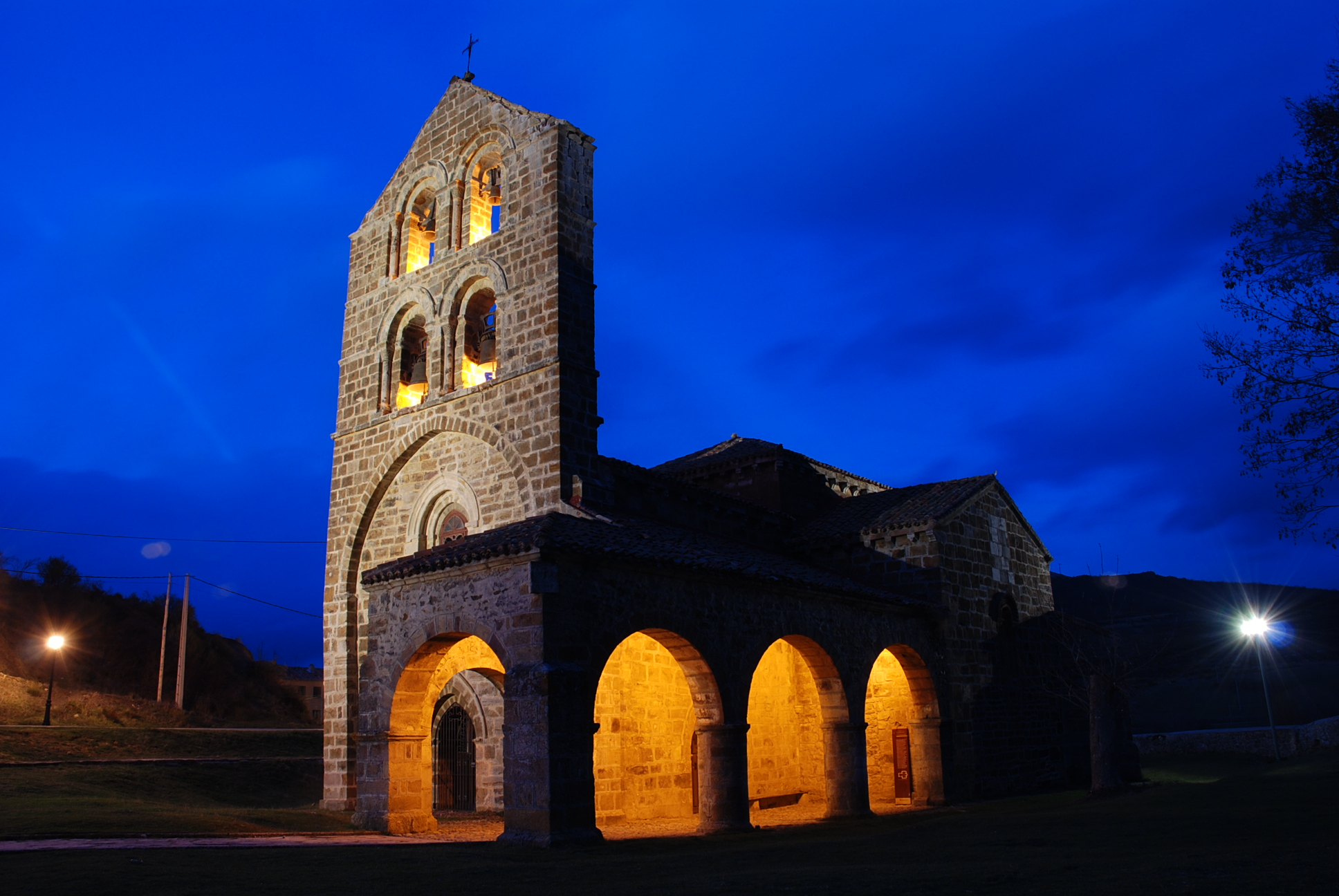
Collegiate Church of San Salvador, in San Salvador de Cantamuda.

Motivation of tourism activity:

- Creation of the Fuentes Carrionas National Hunting Reserve in 1966.
- I Provincial Week of Fuentes Carrionas, study of various aspects of the project of the Reserve, as well as contributing to the dissemination of its natural resources, at the same time as it was intended to promote adequate hunting regulations, control big game and fishing species and improve transport and communication infrastructures, together with accommodation.
- II Provincial Week of Fuentes Carrionas, in which the same proposals continued to be highlighted.
- Within the framework of the III Development Plan, the National Economic and Social Trade Union Council held in 1971 took up and expanded on the tourism proposals of previous years.
- The IV Economic and Social Trade Union Council of Palencia, in 1972, extended the actions in this area to the eastern sector of the region, especially to the valley of Santullán. This valley, once dynamic thanks to mining, was affected at the end of the sixties by the closure of the coal mines, in response to which the public agents proposed the socio-economic reconversion of these municipalities, promoting alternative activities to mining, among which tourism was seen as ‘a catalyst for wealth’.
- III Provincial Tourism Assembly of Palencia, in 1974. Introduction of new proposals for action in the field of tourism, highlighting the tourist potential of the natural areas of Las Tuerces and the Cueva de los Franceses, as well as the historical and artistic heritage, which had been relegated to second place in favour of the use of the natural resources of the region.
- Inauguration of the Parador Nacional de Turismo in Cervera de Pisuerga in 1975. A milestone in the tourist panorama of the Montaña Palentina, through which it was intended to attract a more selected and qualified tourism. In this way, this region became part of the state network of Paradores de Turismo and, consequently, a point of reference within the Spanish tourist panorama.
- The 1980 Provincial Plan for the Development of Tourist Resources, which echoed the same sporting and tourism-related actions proposed throughout this stage.
- The rural development policies of the European Union have been applied in the Montaña Palentina through the community initiative LEADER, whose two programmes, LEADER I (1991–1994) and LEADER II (1995–1999), have been managed and applied in this region through the local action group FEDERACIÓN ADEMPA, under the strategy of promoting regional economic development through one activity, tourism, and through the joint cooperation of the different local agents, both public and private. In this way, a large part of the LEADER programmes' budget has been allocated to tourism promotion, the development of rural tourism and the promotion of complementary activities.

=== Locations ===
- High concentration of Romanesque buildings, the Romanesque of northern Palencia (whose candidacy was presented for World Heritage status, but was not successful, which is why it is on UNESCO's Tentative List).
- Interesting industrial landscape that can be seen in the vestiges resulting from mining activity, including the railway line built in the times of splendour of this activity.
- Traditional buildings and popular architecture.
- The richness of the landscape can be enjoyed on various routes and from different viewpoints.
- Reservoirs used for recreational and scenic purposes.
- Activities such as water sports, hiking, horse riding or cycle-rail routes.
- Mudá town centre with its characteristic oval-shaped rock.

=== Gastronomy ===
- As a first course: pulses in thick broth, garlic soups.
- Second course: Meat (Meat from Cervera and Montaña Palentina) stewed, roasted and, in spring time, trout.
- Delicacies in this area: mushrooms and snails.

== See also ==
- Meat from Cervera and Montaña Palentina
- Palencia mining basin
