= Espigüete =

One of the highest peaks of the Montaña Palentina, Spain

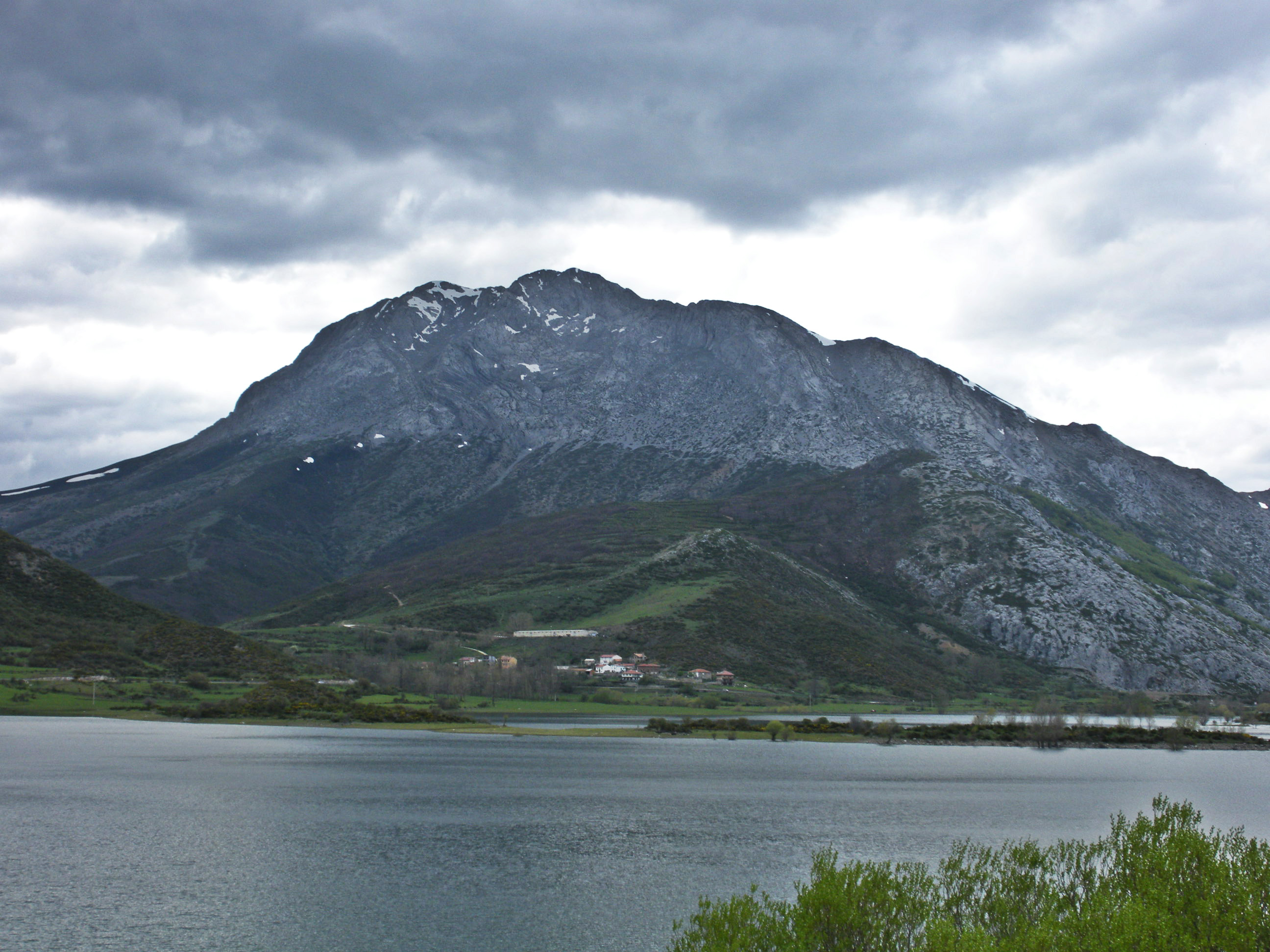

Highest point
- Elevation: 2,450 m (8,040 ft)
- Prominence: 474 m (1,555 ft)
- Coordinates: 42°56′41″N 04°47′46″W

Geography
- Location within Spain
- Country: Spain
- Community: Castile and León
- Provinces: Palencia and León

Geology
- Mountain type: Limestone

Climbing
- First ascent: 1854
- Normal route: South, from Cardaño de Abajo

Pico Espigüete (2450 m) is a mountain in the Montaña Palentina, the mountainous far northern part of the province of Palencia in Castile and León, Spain. Despite not being the highest peak in the area, it is its most emblematic summit, alongside nearby Curavacas. It is located in the municipality of Velilla del Río Carrión.

== Location ==
It is located north of the hamlet of Cardaño de Abajo and south-west of Cardaño de Arriba, in the municipality of Velilla del Río Carrión, within the Montaña Palentina Natural Park, 26 km from the regional centre of Guardo and 126 km from the provincial capital, Palencia. Its western foothills belong to the town of Valverde de la Sierra (León).

== Characteristics ==
=== Main information ===
It is a pyramidal limestone mass, visible from a distance due to its isolation from any other peak. The south face has smooth reliefs while the north face has vertical walls. Due to its composition, it suffers variations in its appearance depending on the season and lighting, being covered with snow most of the winter.

On 27 June 2000, the declaration of the Fuentes Carrionas y Fuente Cobre-Montaña Palentina Natural Park was published in the Boletín Oficial del Estado —revised on 28 May 2010— to which Espigüete belongs. It is one of the highest peaks of the natural park (2450 m), characterized by peaks such as Curavacas (2528) and by the valley bottoms, with a difference in altitude that can reach over 1000 meters.

=== Geomorphology ===
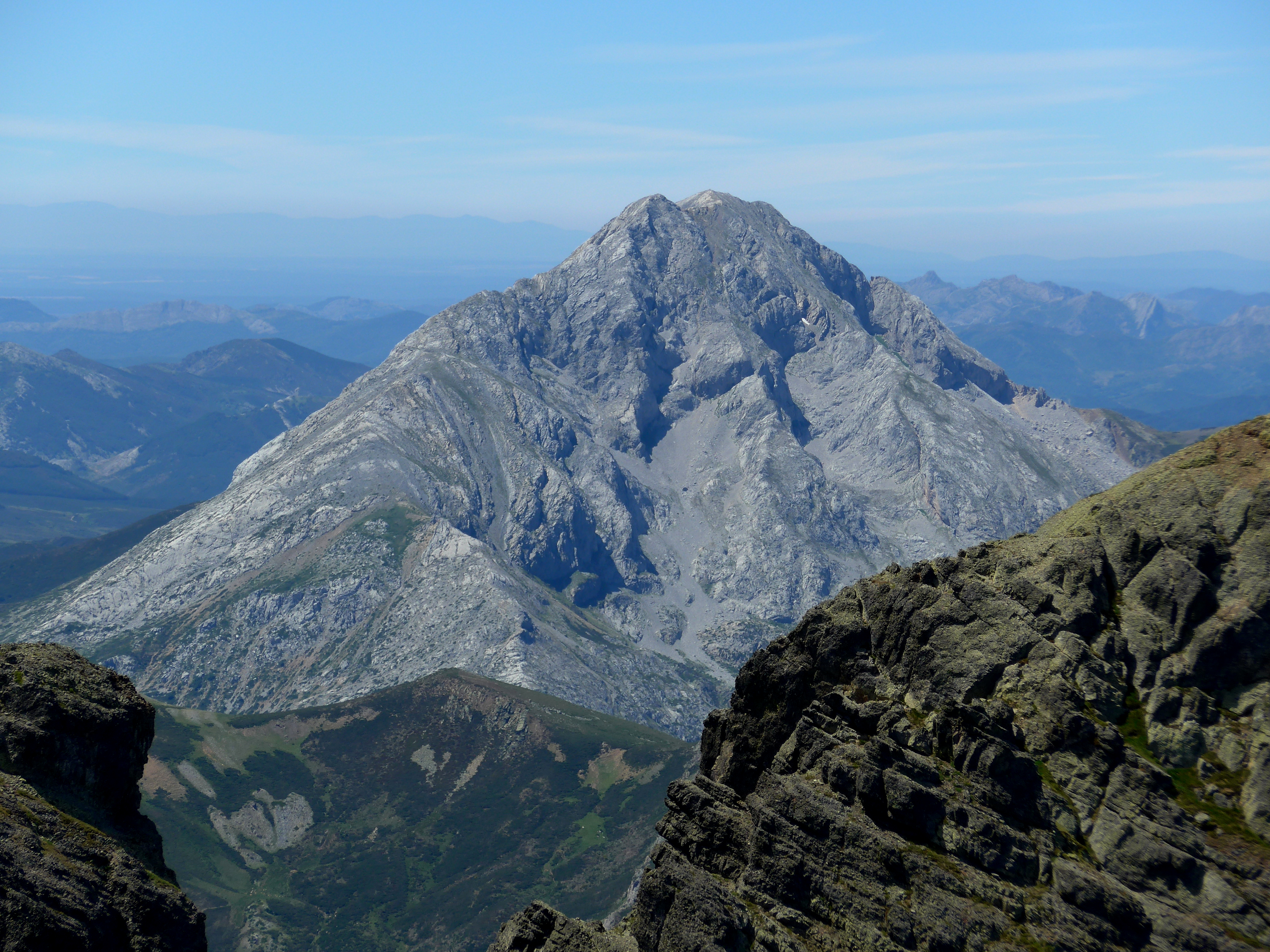
Espigüete contemplated from Curavacas peak

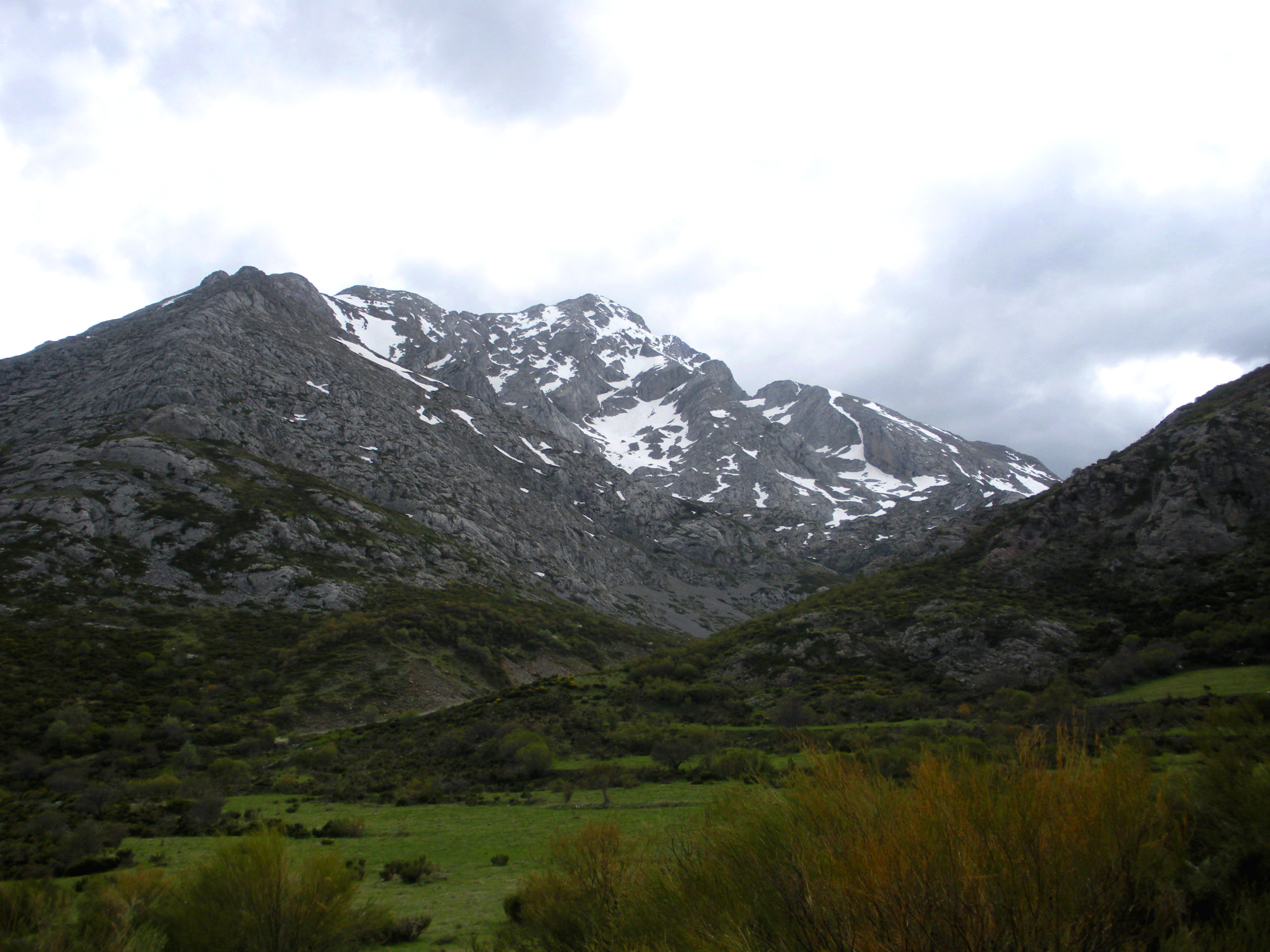
The northeast face of Espigüete, from Cardaño de Arriba.

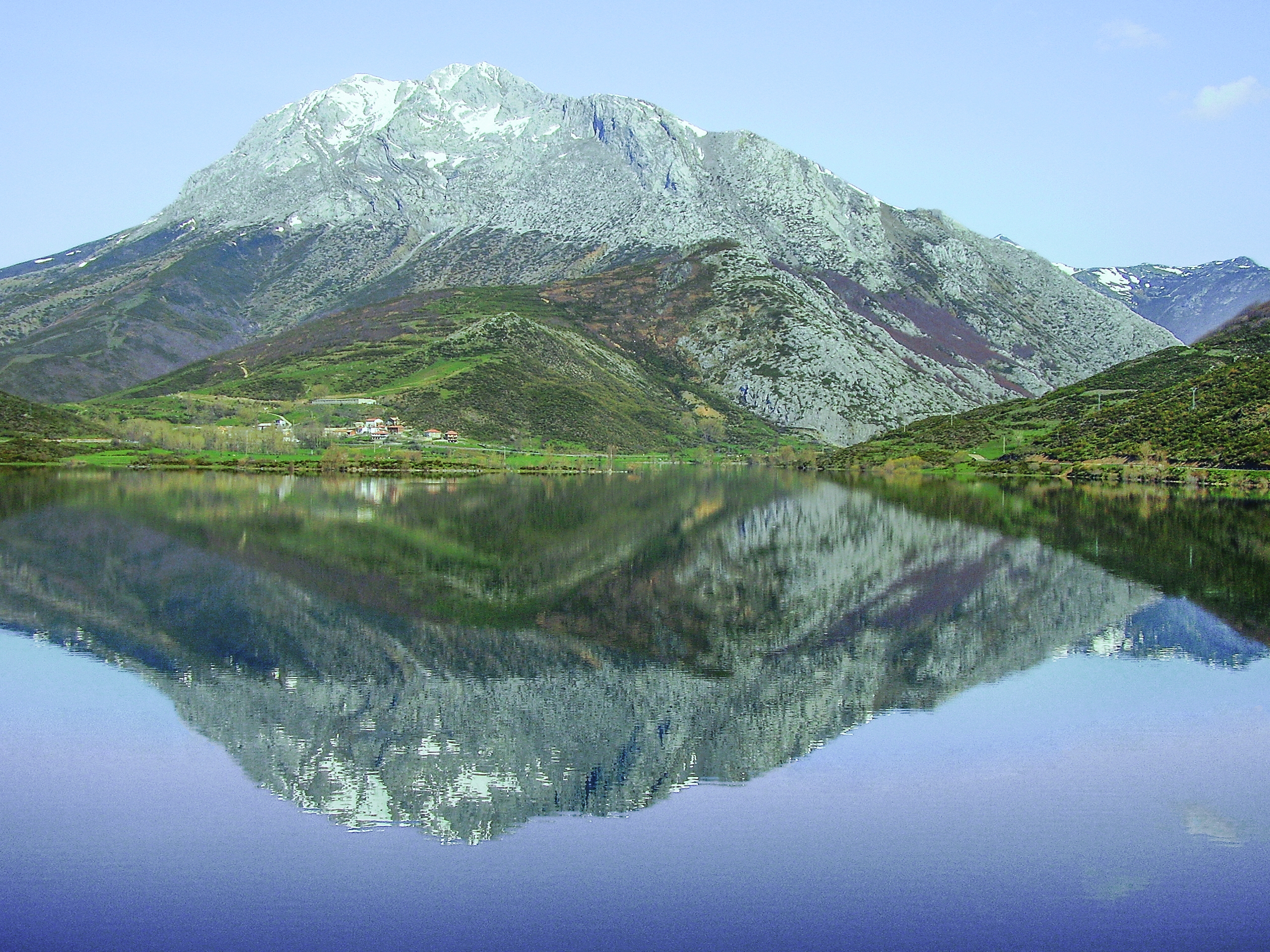
Southeast view of Espigüete reflected in the Camporredondo Reservoir.

Its limits are established by morpho-structural features: to the north, the thrust fault that directs the waters of the Arroyo Mazobres; to the east, the synclinorium complex that sinks its roots in the Arroyo de las Lomas; to the west, it is drawn against the metamorphic slopes of Caladillos and Carrascal; and to the south, its margin is formed by the prolonged slate and sandstone spines of the Cervera Formation. Despite its appearance, the Espigüete has numerous hollows in its interior, where there are huge canyons with subway rivers and lakes, deep pits and caves that make it a real treasure for speleologists.

=== Climatology ===
Espigüete

Climate chart (precipitation, max. and min. temperature)
J	F	M	A	M	J	J	A	S	O	N	D
112 −1 −4	92 5 −3	78 7 −3	97 15 1	79 19 5	59 22 9	31 25 12	6 27 10	45 22 9	105 14 4	106 8 −1	85 3 −4
- █ Average max. and min. temperatures in °C
- █ Precipitation totals in mm
Imperial conversion
J	F	M	A	M	J	J	A	S	O	N	D
4.4 30 25	3.6 41 27	3.1 45 27	3.8 59 34	3.1 66 41	2.3 72 48	1.2 77 54	0.2 81 50	1.8 72 48	4.1 57 39	4.2 46 30	3.3 37 25
- █ Average max. and min. temperatures in °F
- █ Precipitation totals in inches

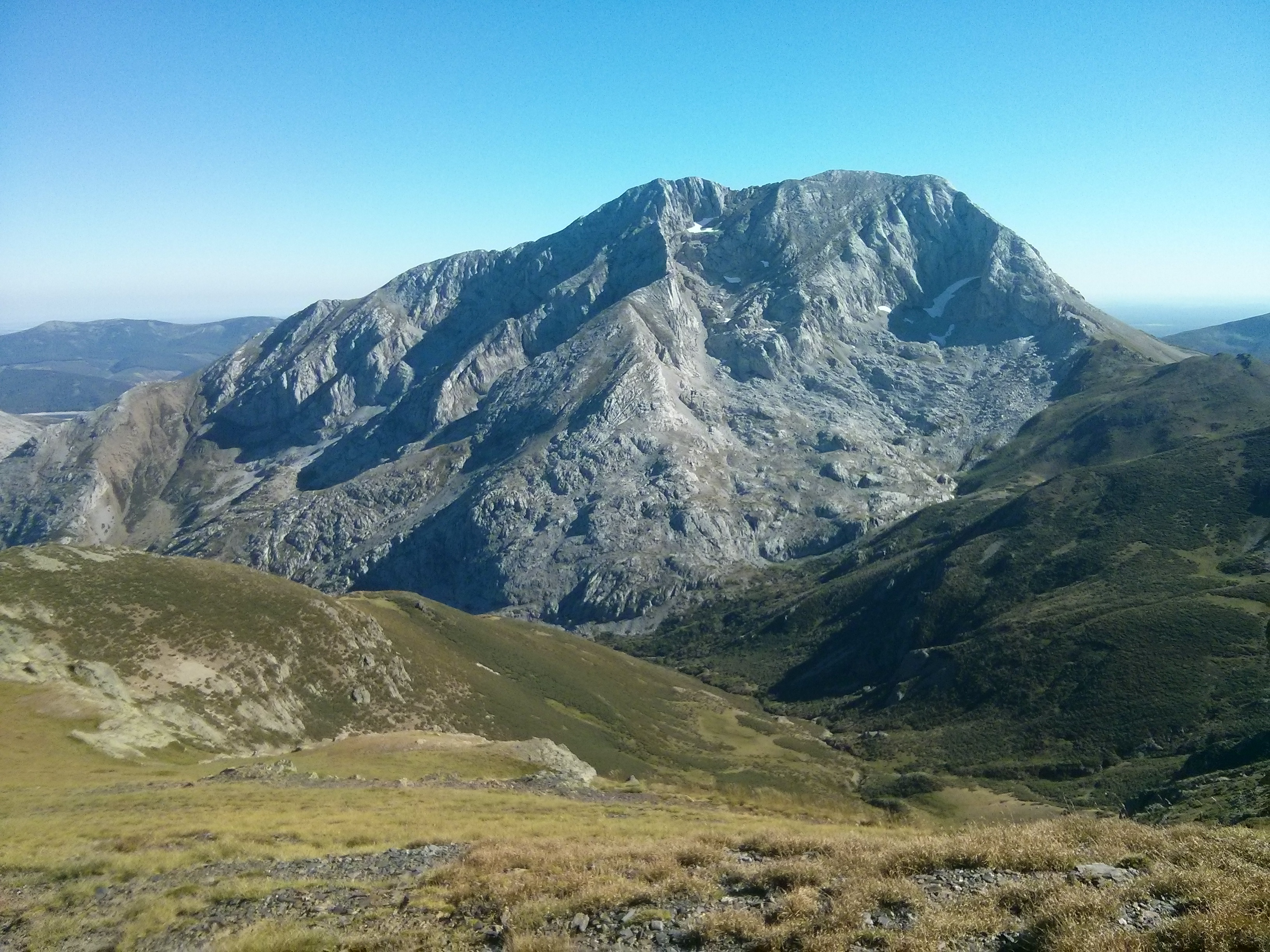
View of Espigüete from La Cerezuela range.

=== Flora ===
It is a transition area in which taxa typical of central and northern Europe are mixed with others characteristic of the Mediterranean world. The climatic conditions make it lack vegetation, developing only some lichen and small plants characteristic of the high mountains. Among the latter it is necessary to highlight a variety of sempervivum that only occurs in this peak, discovered in 1935 by the eminent botanist Paul Leon Giuseppi, and named in his honor Sempervivum Giuseppii.

== History ==
The geologist and naturalist Casiano de Prado is recorded as the first to climb it, in 1854, and so did Aymar de Saint-Saud in 1892, on one of his visits to Picos de Europa.
