= Velilla del Río Carrión =

- Municipality
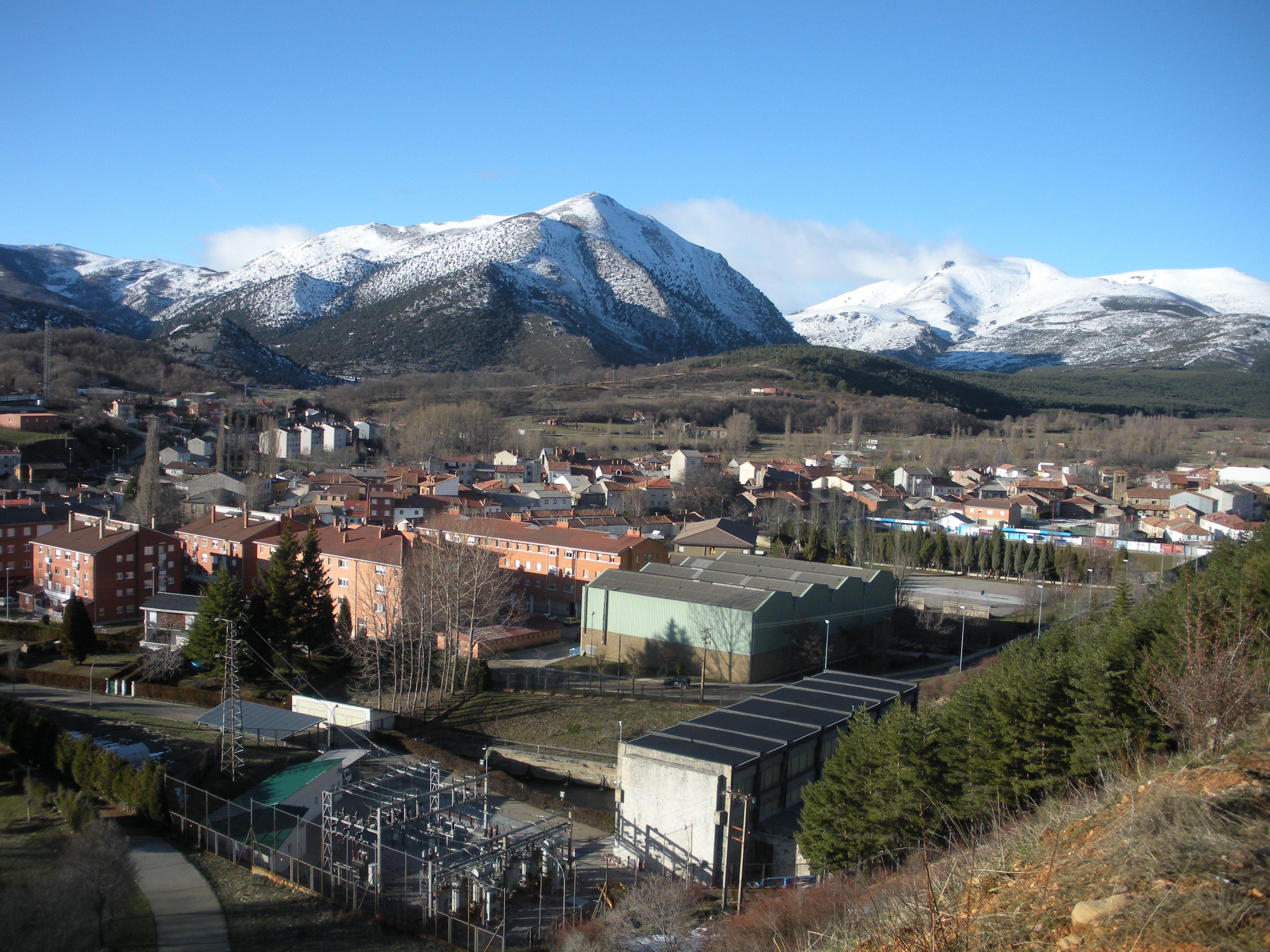
- Velilla with Peña Lampa behind

- Flag Coat of arms
- Interactive map of Velilla del Río Carrión
- Coordinates: 42°49′34″N 4°50′48″W
- Country: Spain
- Autonomous community: Castile and León
- Province: Palencia
- Municipality: Velilla del Río Carrión

Area
  - Total: 199 km^{2} (77 sq mi)

Population (2025-01-01)
  - Total: 1,104
  - Density: 5.55/km^{2} (14.4/sq mi)
- Time zone: UTC+1 (CET)
  - Summer (DST): UTC+2 (CEST)
- Website: Official website

Velilla del Río Carrión (or simply Velilla) is a town and municipality located in Montaña Palentina of the province of Palencia, Castile and León, Spain. According to the 2023 INE census, the municipality has a population of 1,145 inhabitants, the majority of whom live in the town of Velilla itself.

The village straddles either side of the Carrión river, a tributary of the Pisuerga and eventually the Duero. It is only 5 kilometres upstream from Guardo, the largest town in the region. Velilla's town centre is overlooked by two prominent mountains: Peña Lampa (1804m, which forms the provincial border between Palencia and León) and the Peña Mayor de Velilla (1869m) in the adjacent Sierra de Brezo.

The wider municipality comprises a geographically large and mountainous area of the far north of Palencia province, incorporating the isolated villages of Otero de Guardo, Alba de los Cardaños, Camporredondo de Alba, Cardaño de Abajo and Cardaño de Arriba. The main landmarks in the area are Espigüete (2450m), the most emblematic mountain in the area, and Pico Murcia (2431m) a nearby pyramid-shaped peak. The town of Velilla (along with Cervera de Pisuerga) is the starting point of the Ruta de los Pantanos or 'Reservoirs Route', a route which follows the P-210 through the Palentine mountains alongside the Compuerto and Camporredondo reservoirs (inaugurated in 1960 and 1930 respectively).

The Cantabri, a pre-Roman tribal federation who lived in northern Iberia in the second half of the first millennium BCE, were the area's first inhabitants and possibly constructed the town's famous Fontes Tamarici.

Although its original Cantabri name was Tamarica, the town was known as Velilla de Guardo until 1949, when it adopted its present name, which describes its position on the Carrión river.

Although for much of the 20th century its economy was largely dedicated to coal mining, the decline of this industry from the 1980s onwards has resulted in a sharp decline in Velilla's population, a decline characteristic of much of rural Spain. Velilla was home to the Velilla Power Plant owned by Iberdrola until its cooling towers were demolished in June 2020.

Nowadays, Velilla is in the process of reinventing itself as a minor centre of rural tourism, with an adventure sports centre, a visitor centre about the local trout population and most recently a children's attraction centred on Ratoncito Pérez.

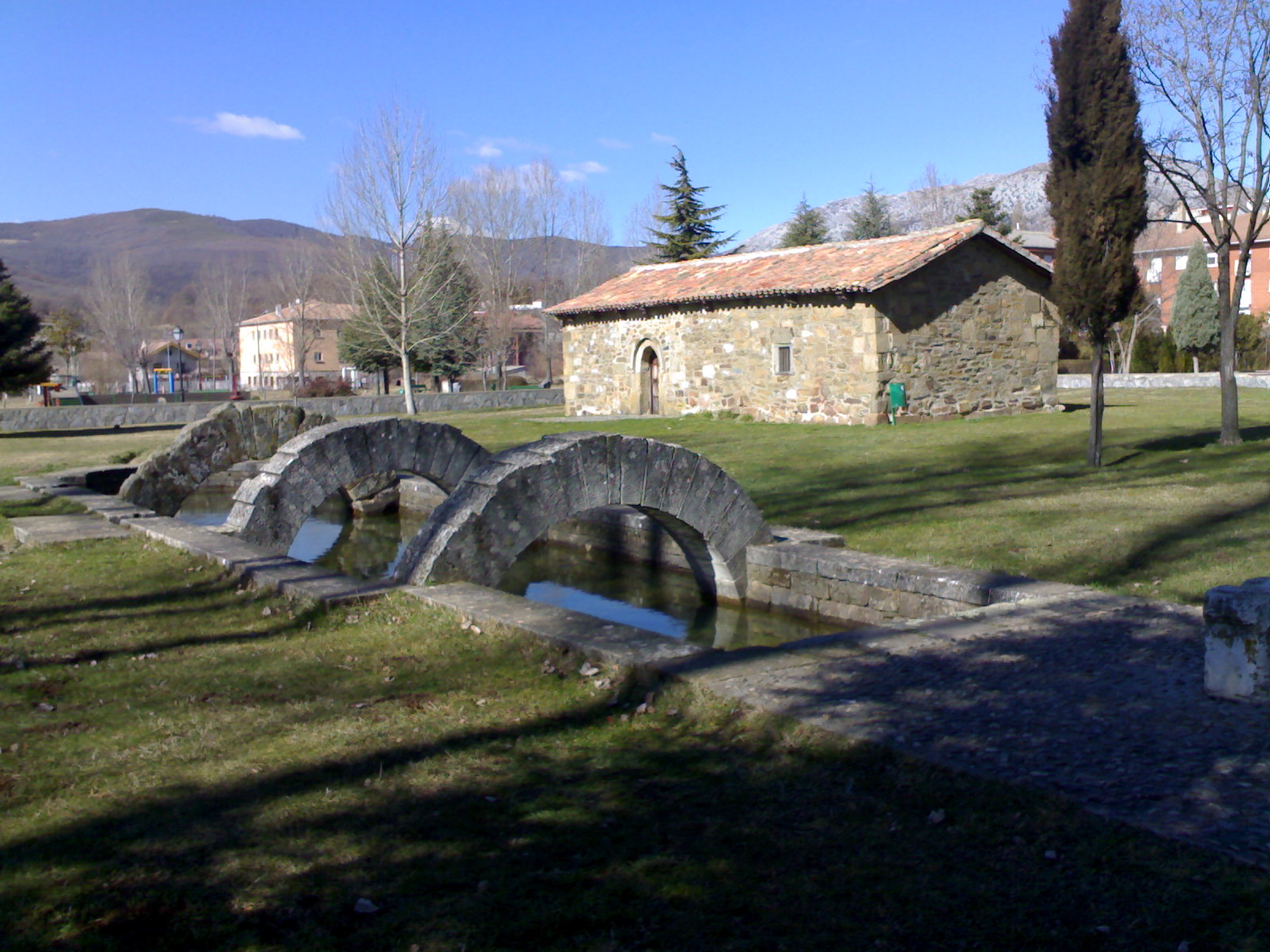
Fontes Tamarici

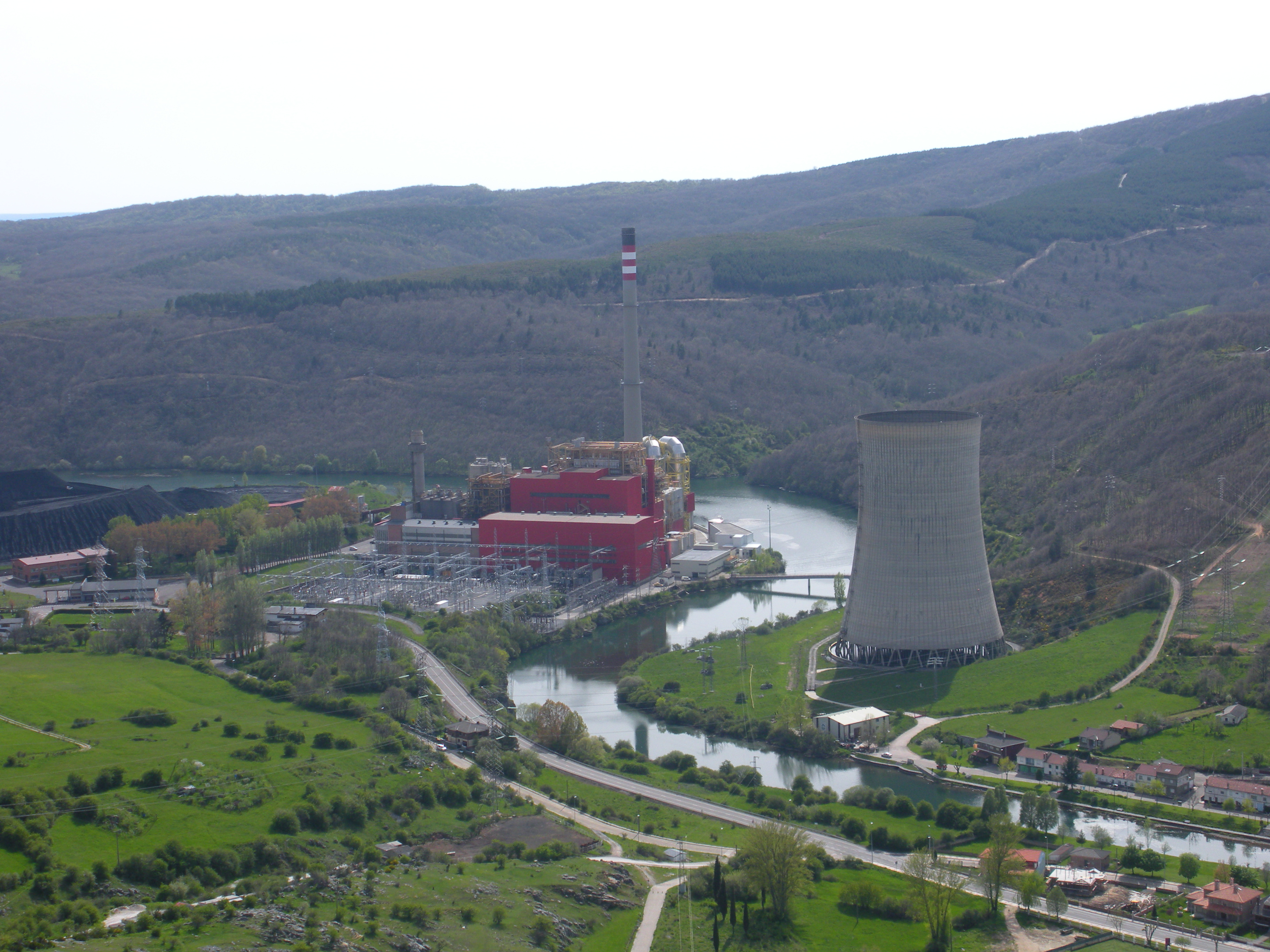
Velilla Power Plant

== Notable people ==
- Mara Santos, world champion in canoe marathon.
