= Curavacas =

Mountain in Spain

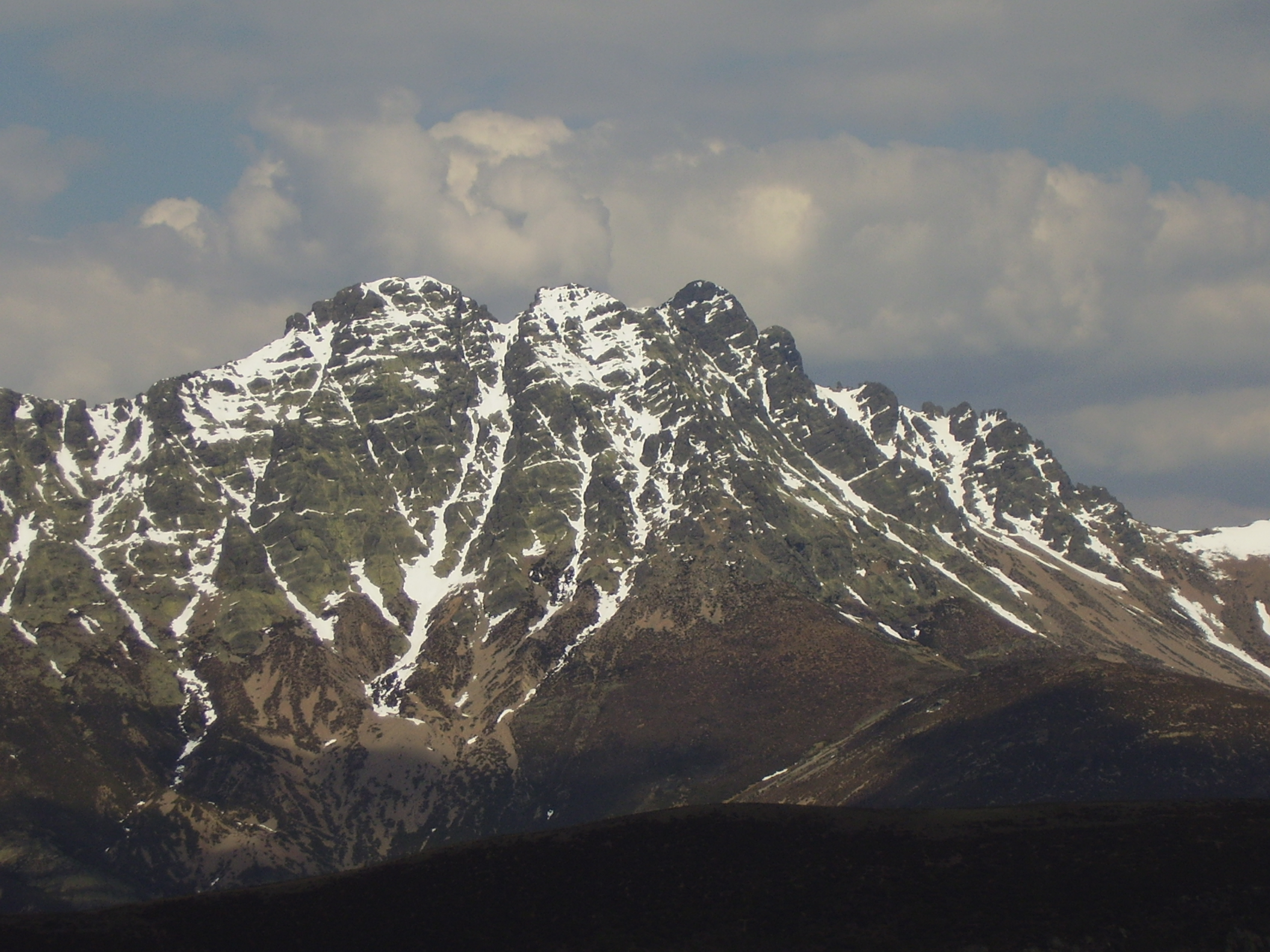
Curavacas

Curavacas is a prominent mountain in the Montaña Palentina, the mountainous northern part of the province of Palencia in Castile and León, Spain. At 2524 metres above sea level, it is one of the most emblematic peaks in the area, alongside nearby Espigüete. It is located in the municipality of Triollo.

== See also ==
- Montaña Palentina
