= Triollo =

Coordinates: 42°56′N 4°41′W

- municipality
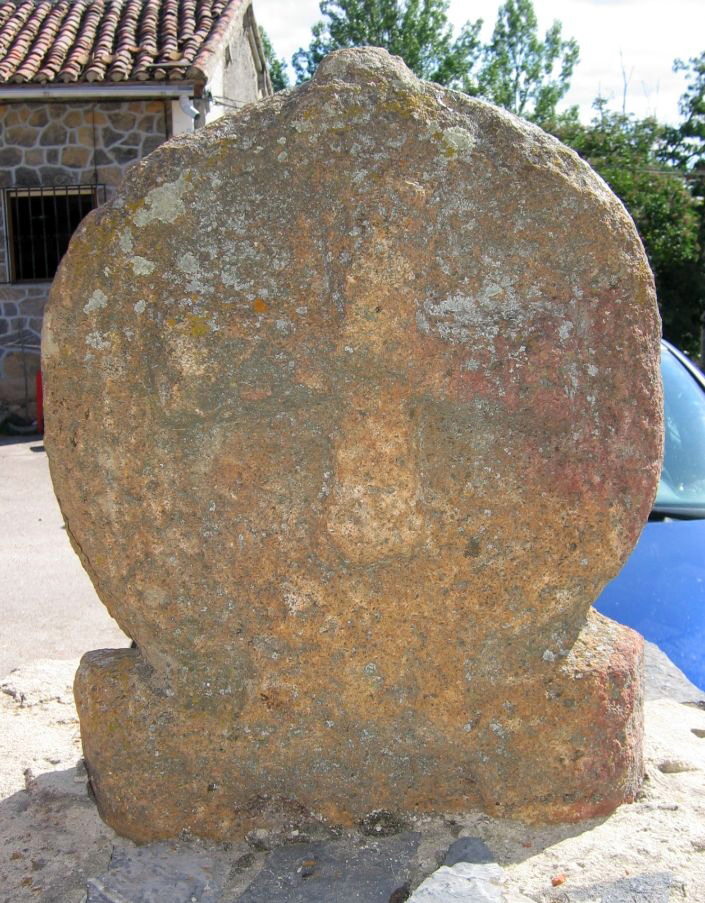
- Interactive map of Triollo
- Country: Spain
- Autonomous community: Castile and León
- Province: Palencia
- Municipality: Triollo

Area
  - Total: 63 km^{2} (24 sq mi)

Population (2025-01-01)
  - Total: 73
  - Density: 1.2/km^{2} (3.0/sq mi)
- Time zone: UTC+1 (CET)
  - Summer (DST): UTC+2 (CEST)
- Website: Official website

Triollo is a municipality located in the Montaña Palentina of province of Palencia, Castile and León, Spain. According to the 2004 census (INE), the municipality has a population of 86 inhabitants. The municipality's most famous landmark is Curavacas (2524 m).
