= Mantinos =

Coordinates: 42°45′N 4°50′W

- municipality
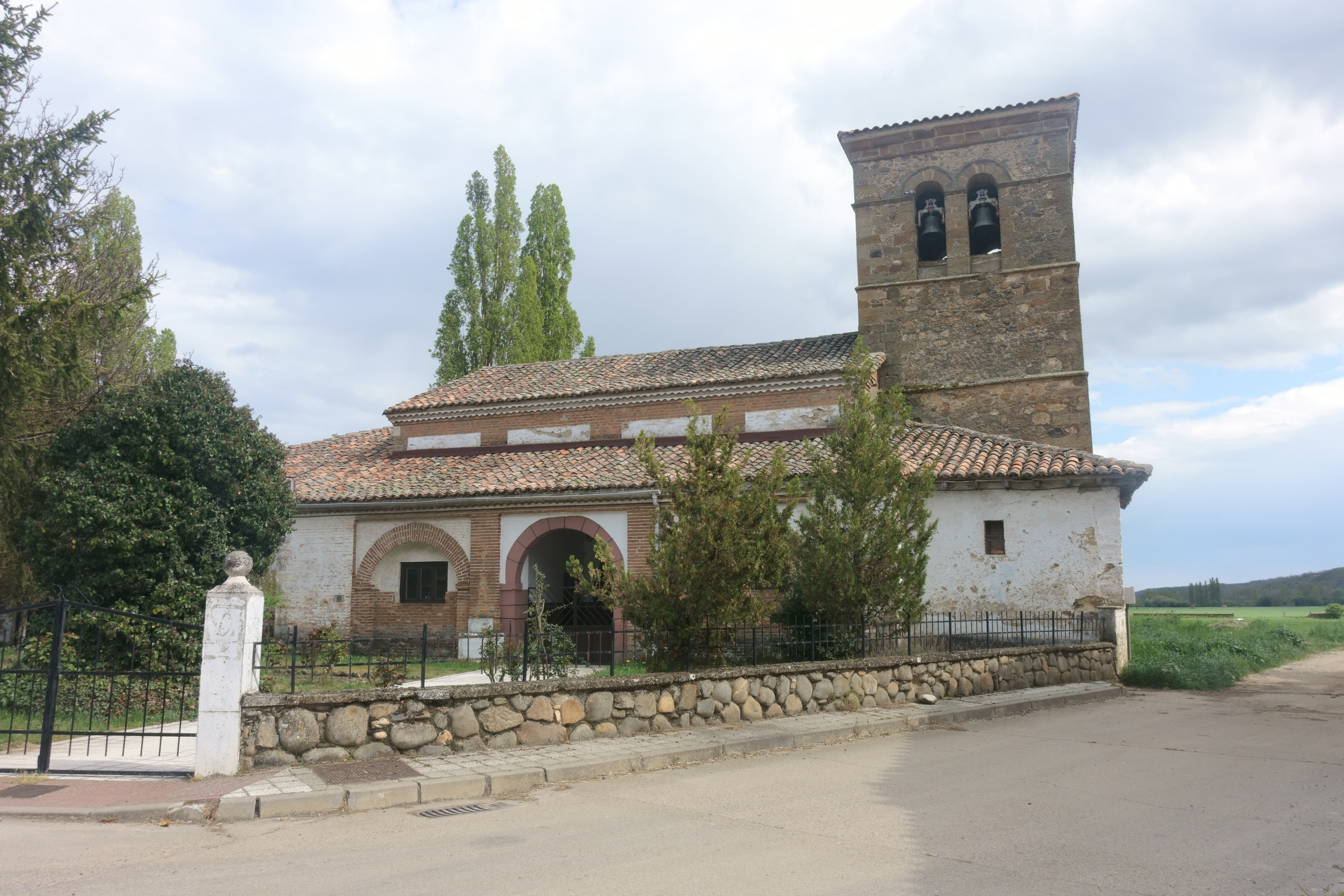

- Flag Coat of arms
- Interactive map of Mantinos
- Country: Spain
- Autonomous community: Castile and León
- Province: Palencia
- Municipality: Mantinos

Area
  - Total: 25 km^{2} (9.7 sq mi)

Population (2025-01-01)
  - Total: 142
  - Density: 5.7/km^{2} (15/sq mi)
- Time zone: UTC+1 (CET)
  - Summer (DST): UTC+2 (CEST)
- Website: Official website

Mantinos is a village and municipality located in the province of Palencia, Castile and León, Spain. According to the 2004 census (INE), the municipality has a population of 170 inhabitants.

The village is located on the left bank of the River Carrión and is immediately downstream from the town of Guardo. Its major landmark is the Church of San Juan, which dates back to 1777.
