= Berzosilla =

Coordinates: 42°47′N 4°02′W

- municipality
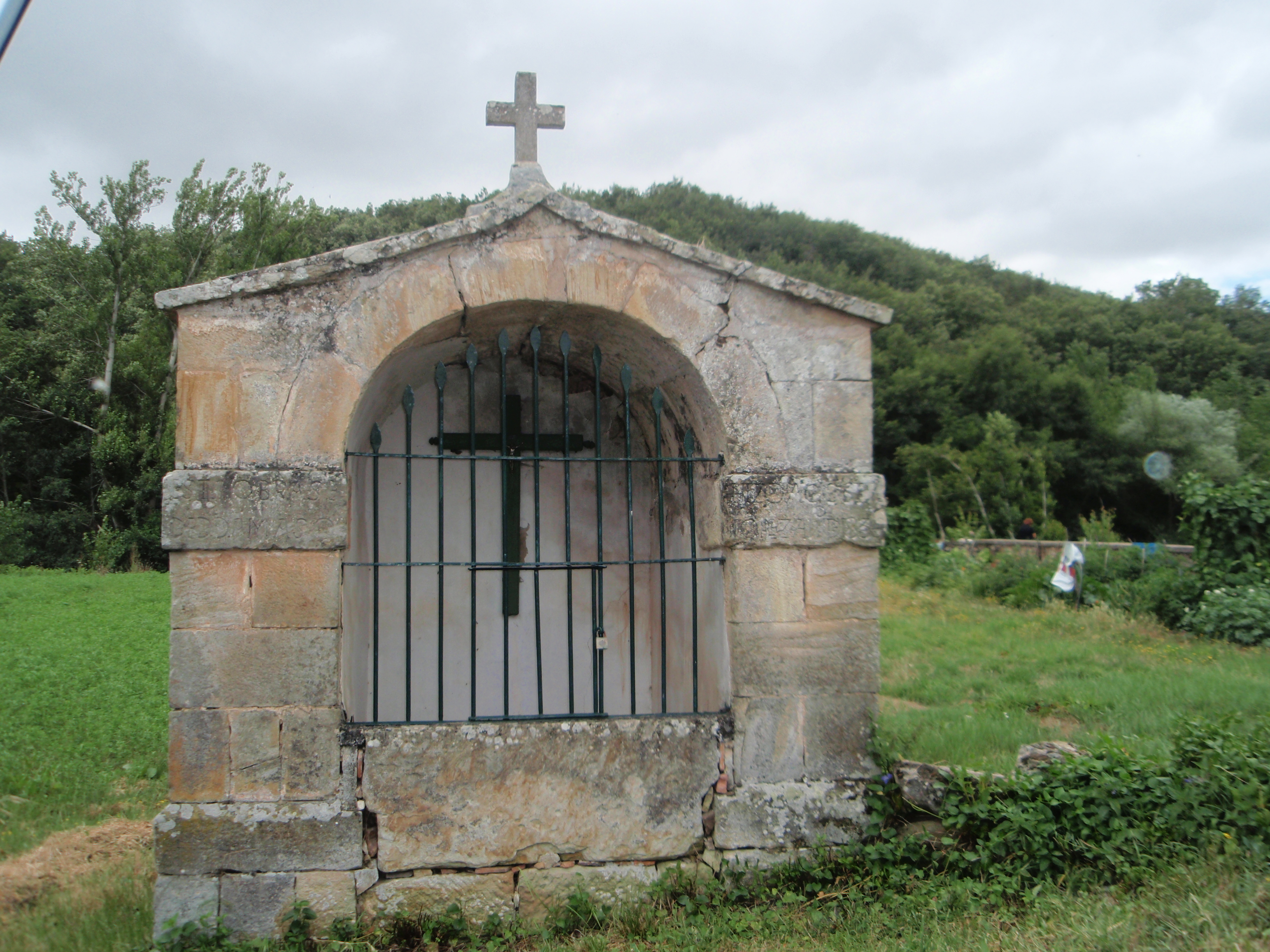
- Interactive map of Berzosilla
- Country: Spain
- Autonomous community: Castile and León
- Province: Palencia
- Municipality: Berzosilla

Area
  - Total: 19 km^{2} (7.3 sq mi)

Population (2025-01-01)
  - Total: 45
  - Density: 2.4/km^{2} (6.1/sq mi)
- Time zone: UTC+1 (CET)
  - Summer (DST): UTC+2 (CEST)
- Website: Official website

Berzosilla is a municipality located in the province of Palencia, Castile and León, Spain. According to the 2025 census (INE), the municipality has a population of 45 inhabitants. The municipality is an exclave of the province of Palencia, Castile and León, surrounded by Cantabria.
