= Mudá =

Coordinates: 42°53′N 4°24′W

- municipality
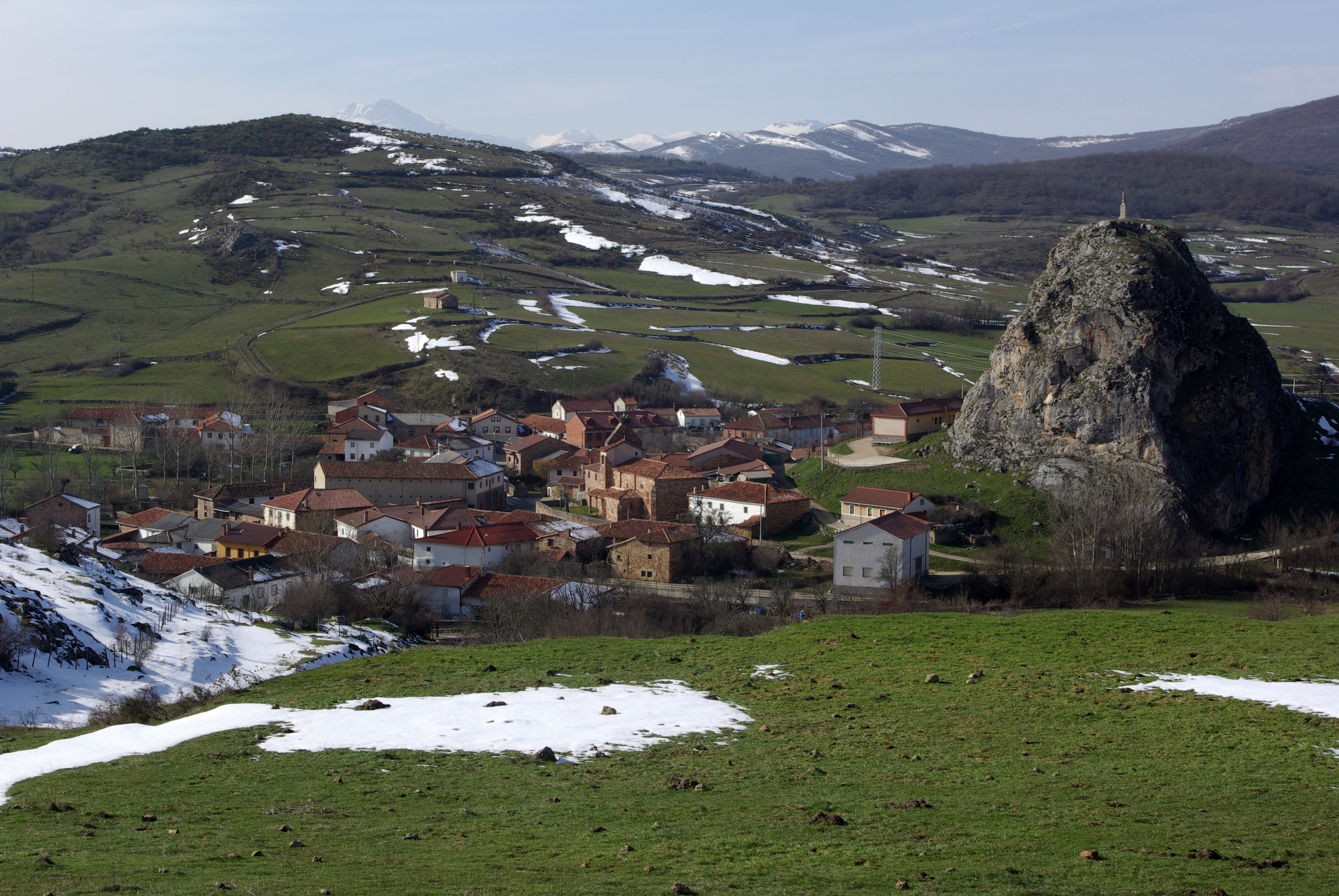
- Interactive map of Mudá
- Country: Spain
- Autonomous community: Castile and León
- Province: Palencia
- Municipality: Mudá

Area
  - Total: 6 km^{2} (2.3 sq mi)

Population (2025-01-01)
  - Total: 81
  - Density: 14/km^{2} (35/sq mi)
- Time zone: UTC+1 (CET)
  - Summer (DST): UTC+2 (CEST)
- Website: Official website

Mudá is a municipality located in the province of Palencia, Castile and León, Spain. According to the 2004 census (INE), the municipality has a population of 105 inhabitants.

Mudá is first recorded in 1059, under the name Mudave.
