= Velilla Power Plant =

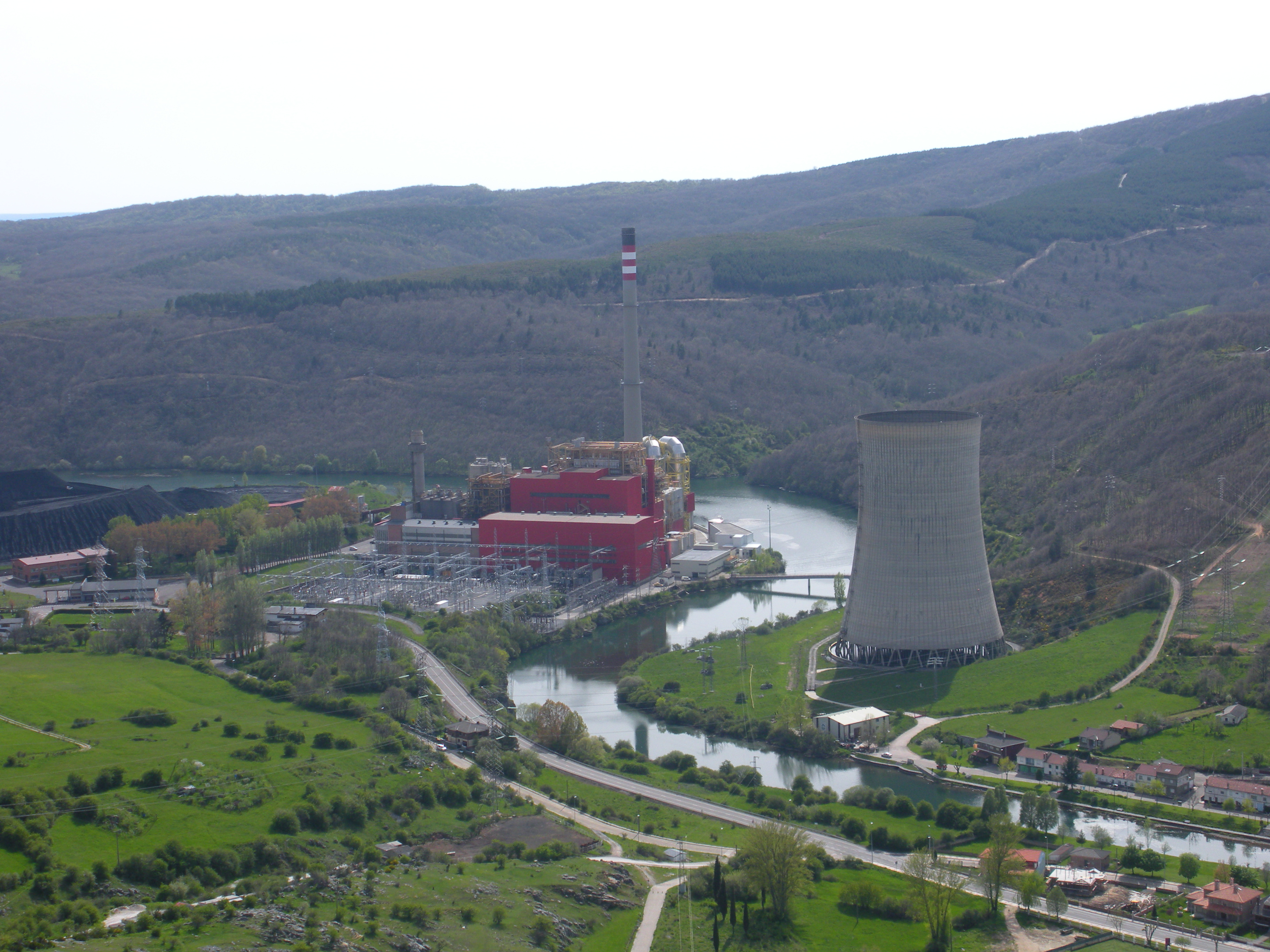
- Official name: Central térmica de Velilla
- Country: Spain
- Location: Velilla del Río Carrión
- Coordinates: 42°49′05″N 4°51′14″W
- Status: Decommissioned
- Commission date: 1964
- Decommission date: June 30, 2020
- Owner: Iberdrola
- Operator: Iberdrola

Thermal power station
- Primary fuel: Coal

Power generation
- Units operational: 1 x 148 MW; 1 x 350 MW
- Nameplate capacity: 498 MW

External links
- Commons: Related media on Commons

Velilla Power Plant was a coal-fired power plant near the village of Velilla del Río Carrión in the province of Palencia, community of Castile and León, Spain. Velilla Power Plant had two generating units with a capacity of 148 MW and 350 MW. The first unit was put into operation in 1964, and the second in 1984.

In 2008, Velilla Power Plant was equipped with filters, so now more than 95% of the detrimental sulfur dioxide are filtered out from smoke. This facility is owned by Iberdrola; it was shut down on June 30, 2020.

== See also ==
Palencia mining basin
