= Guardo =

- Municipality
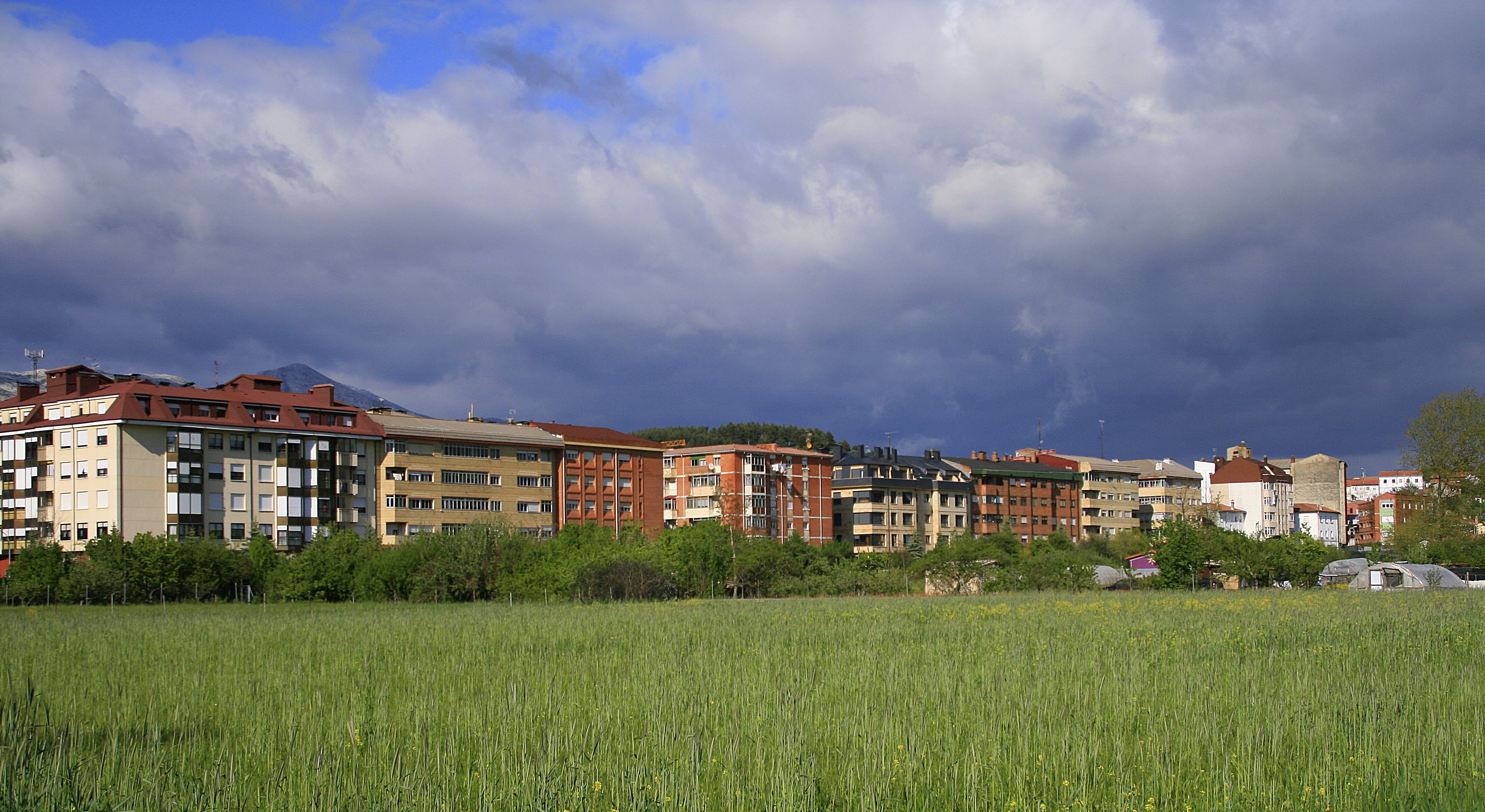

- Coat of arms

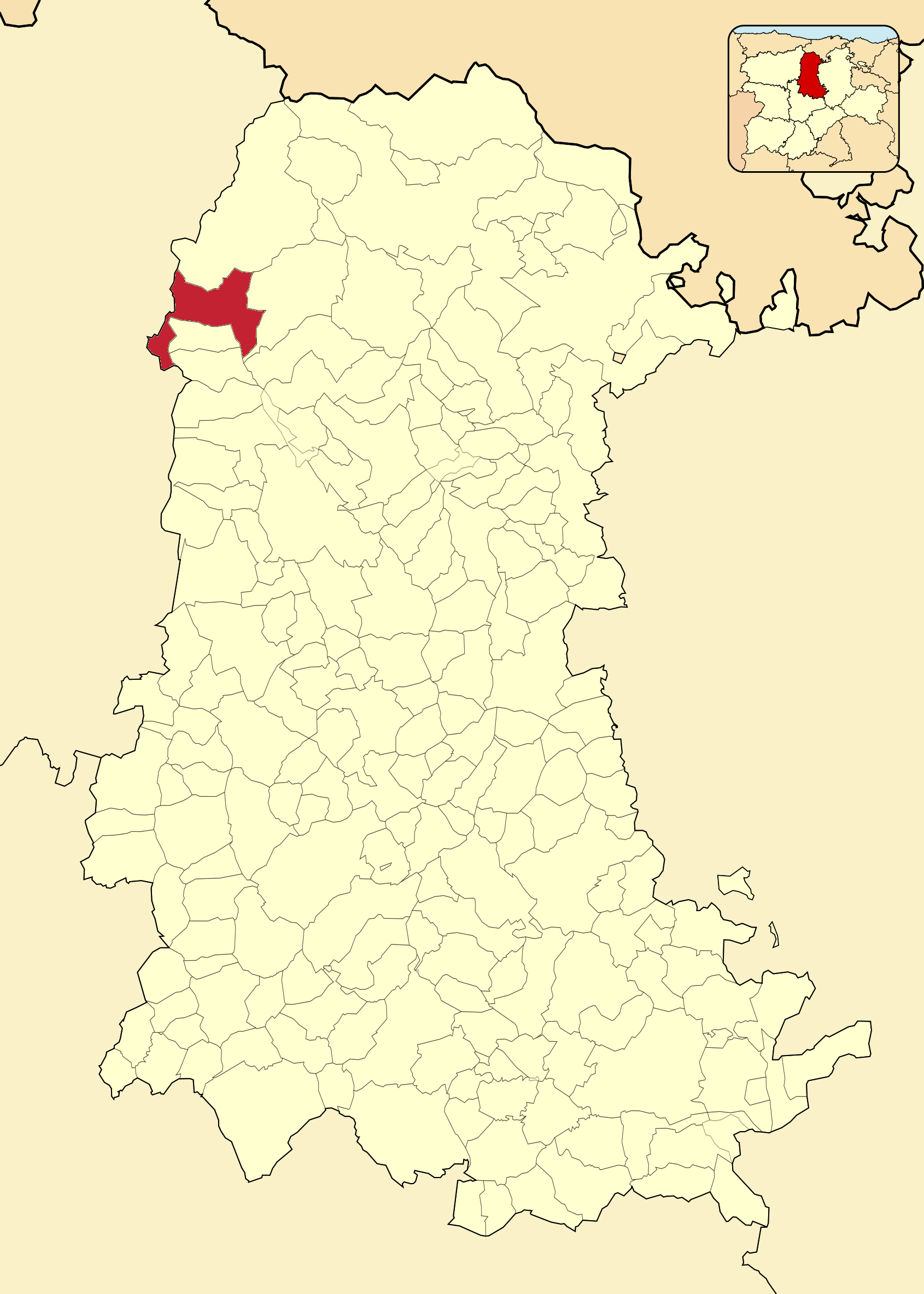

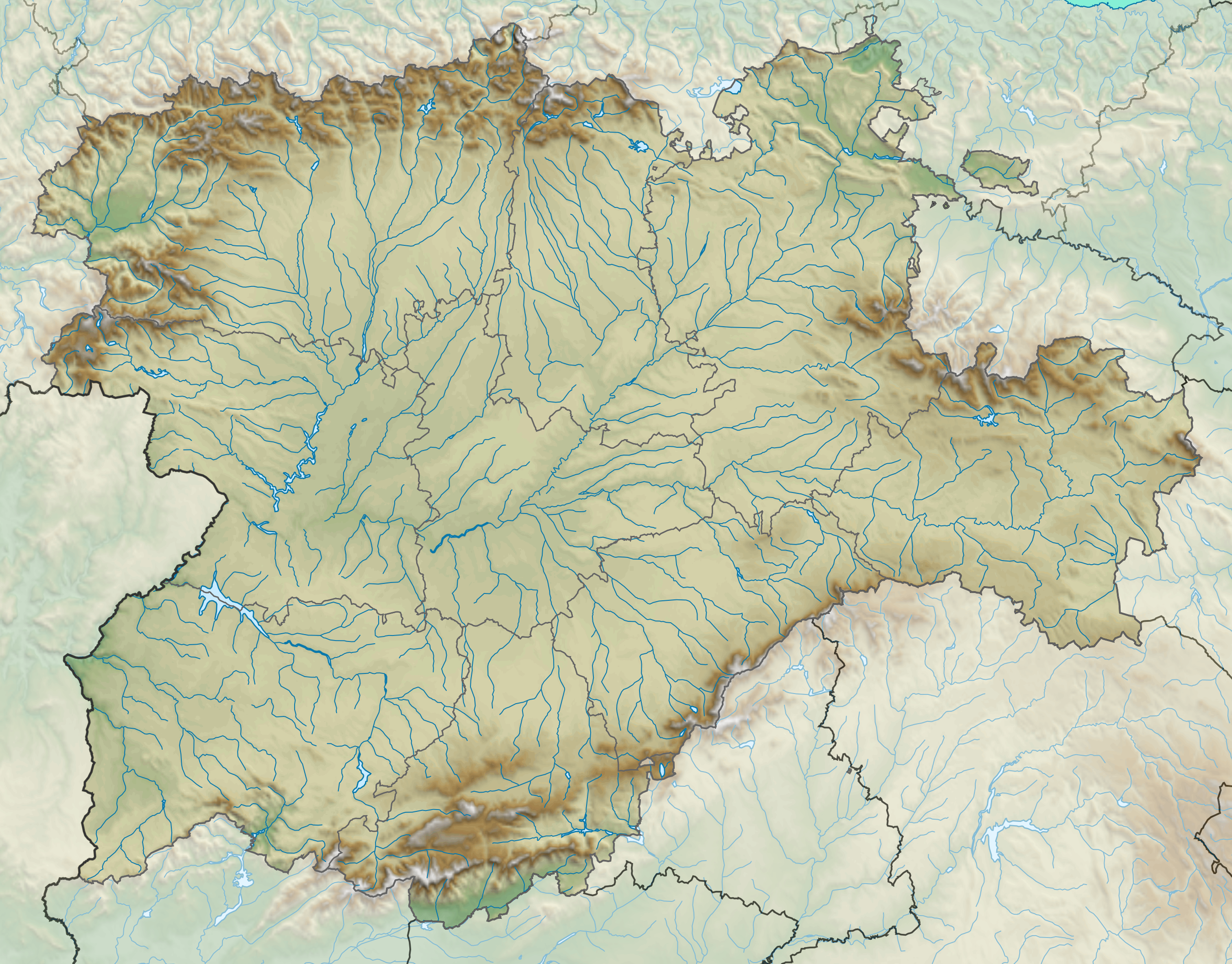
- Location in Spain Guardo (Castile and León)
- Coordinates: 42°47′22″N 4°50′47″W
- Country: Spain
- Autonomous community: Castile and León
- Province: Palencia

Government
  - Mayor: Juan Jesús Blanco Muñiz (PP)

Area
  - Total: 62.83 km^{2} (24.26 sq mi)
- Elevation: 1,123 m (3,684 ft)

Population (2025-01-01)
  - Total: 5,502
  - Density: 87.57/km^{2} (226.8/sq mi)
- Demonym: guardense
- Postal code: 34880
- Website: Official website

Guardo is a town and municipality situated in the Montaña Palentina region in the far north of the province of Palencia, in the autonomous community of Castile and León, Spain. As of 2023, the municipality had 5653 residents, making it the third most populated settlement in the province.

== History ==
=== Origins and early period ===
Little is known about the pre-medieval history of Guardo. The name of one of the town's suburbs, Valdecastro, suggests the existence of some kind of Celtic fort, although no historical sources can confirm this. The origin of the town's name has been extensively discussed. According to Quirino Fernández, it could come from the Latin 'Bucca ad ardum' or 'Mouth of the Heights', which could be translated as a pass of difficult access, whereas Julio Caro Baroja links it to the Celtic word 'ward', or Land of Storms.

Guardo is first mentioned in the 10th century as 'Buardo' or 'Boardo', as a village linked to the nearby San Román de Entrepeñas Monastery in a document about property transfer. Forming part of the Counts of Saldañas' estate, its castle, which was strategically situated on a hill above the banks of the Carrión river, was used to monitor the possible Muslim raids and to control the border with the Kingdom of León and the County of Castile.

In the 13th century, King Alfonso VII ordered for the castle at Guardo to be "maintained and for its occupiers to be perpetually garrisoned". The fortress comprised a tower to monitor local travel, a chapel dedicated to Nuestra Señora del Castillo and a necropolis. The castle had completely disappeared by the 19th century, when its stone was used for the construction of the train line between Bilbao and La Robla.

From 1636 until 1801, Guardo belonged to the province of Toro, before being incorporated into Palencia, to which it still belongs today. For much of its early history, the village relied on rearing cattle and agriculture and remained a small settlement up until the modern era.

=== Industrial development and decline ===
Guardo's industrial development paralleled the discovery of coal in the region towards the end of the 19th century, as well as the construction of the La Robla to Bilbao narrow gauge railway, which transported said coal to the seaports of Santander and Bilbao, as well as to the Altos Hornos de Vizcaya in the Basque Country. With the onset of mining in the area at the start of the 20th century and the influx of people from other regions seeking employment in coal extraction, the character of the town underwent a radical change as the old urban centre was surrounded by new housing. The town's population would increasingly increase until it reached a high point in the 1960s, when it was more than double the present population.

Alongside the town of Barruelo de Santullán to the northeast, Guardo became one of the main areas of conflict in the Montaña Palentina during the failed Revolution of October 1934. The rebels assaulted the Civil Guard's barracks, killing a gendarme and setting fire to the building. The conflict ended with the arrival of the army and the fleeing of the revolutionaries into the nearby hills, before they eventually surrendered. After this event, as well as during the Spanish Civil War, the Nationalist uprising encountered no opposition in the region, which ensured that armed resistance to the Francoist state remained minimal in the decade following the conflict.

By the 1980s, with Spain's accession to the European Economic Community and the decline of coal mining due to both its economic infeasibility and European environmental objectives, the whole region entered a profound economic crisis aggravated by the scarcity of services (such as a hospital and law courts) and a sustained period of alarming depopulation, the latter of which remains an issue in much of rural Spain to the present day.

== Physical geography ==
The town is situated on the banks of the Carrión river on the southern slopes of the Sierra del Brezo, a mountain range that separates the Cantabrian Mountains from the Meseta Central.

Guardo's average elevation is 1123 metres above sea level. The majority of the town is modern, mainly constructed during the first half of the 20th century, although there is a small historic section on a hill to the east. The centre of the town is on the left bank of the river. The right bank contains the railway and industrial facilities, many of which are no longer in operation.

The municipality of Guardo, in addition to the titular town, also comprises the hamlets of Muñeca, Intorcisa and San Pedro de Cansoles.

Guardo itself is 91 km away from Palencia, the provincial capital, 145 km from Valladolid, 137 km from Burgos and 85 km from León.

It is the capital of the comarca of Alto Carrión and is by the far the largest settlement in this mountainous region of northern Castille and Leon.

The elevation of the municipality oscillates between 1836 metres on the summit of Peña Mayor de Guardo and approximately 1100 metres on the banks of the Carrión as it flows towards the village of Mantinos to the south.

Guardo is situated on the Camino Olvidado a Santiago, or the 'Forgotten Way' of St James, a route of the Camino de Santiago that was used by the very first pilgrims travelling to Santiago de Compostela in Galicia.

== Climate ==
Guardo has a fresh Mediterranean climate (type Csb), close to the boundary with a type Cfb oceanic climate. The following table indicates the climatic averages for the locality:

Climate data for Guardo en el periodo 1962-2019
Month	Jan	Feb	Mar	Apr	May	Jun	Jul	Aug	Sep	Oct	Nov	Dec	Year
Mean daily maximum °C (°F)	7 (45)	9 (48)	14 (57)	17 (63)	22 (72)	27 (81)	30 (86)	30 (86)	26 (79)	19 (66)	14 (57)	8 (46)	19 (66)
Daily mean °C (°F)	1.5 (34.7)	4 (39)	7 (45)	12.5 (54.5)	15.5 (59.9)	20.5 (68.9)	24 (75)	23.5 (74.3)	18 (64)	13.5 (56.3)	7 (45)	2.5 (36.5)	9.5 (49.1)
Mean daily minimum °C (°F)	−2 (28)	0 (32)	4 (39)	6 (43)	12 (54)	12 (54)	14 (57)	14 (57)	12 (54)	8 (46)	2 (36)	−2 (28)	7 (44)
Average precipitation cm (inches)	24.5 (9.6)	20.6 (8.1)	13.1 (5.2)	3.6 (1.4)	0.2 (0.1)	0 (0)	0 (0)	0 (0)	0 (0)	0 (0)	4.7 (1.9)	5.6 (2.2)	72.3 (28.5)
Average rainy days	14	12	10	16	9	8	4	3	6	12	15	7	116
Average snowy days	7	8	6	3	1	0	0	0	0	0	2	3	30
Source: Ministerio de Agricultura, Alimentación y Medio Ambiente. Datos de precipitación para el periodo 1961-2003 y de temperatura para el periodo 1971-1992 en Guardo.

== Culture ==
=== Festivals ===
- Week of the 13 June: San Antonio de Padua (the annual village festival)
- 24 June: San Juan
- 10 July: Santa Marta
- 16 July: Procession of El Carmen
- 4 December: Santa Bárbara (the patron saint of miners)

== Landmarks ==
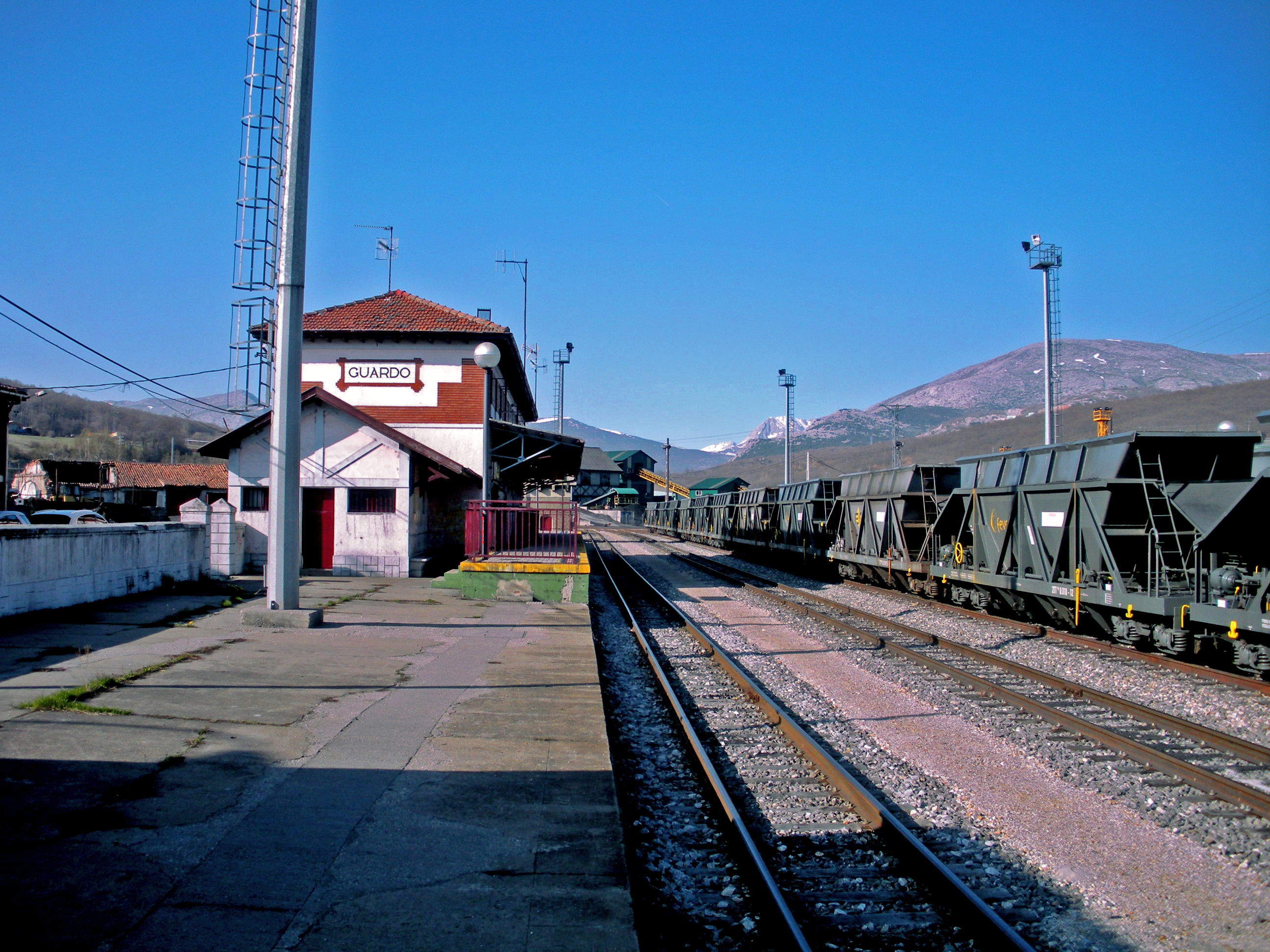
Train Station of La Robla railway in Guardo.

=== Iglesia de San Juan Bautista (St John the Baptist Church) ===
Situated on a hill in the east of town in a neighbourhood known as El Otero (The Hill). It was built in the 14th century in a florid Gothic style. Inside there is a Romanesque font dating back to the 18th century.

Palacio del Arzobispo Bullón (Archbishop Bullón's Palace)

This palace is located in the upper town and is well-known for its splendid Barroque façade dating back to the 18th century. It was declared a Bien de interés cultural and was restored in 2022.

=== Monumento al Minero (Monument to the Miner) ===
The Monument to the Miner is a 4-metre high bronze figure depicting various coal-mining imagery suspended on a concrete plinth above a pool and fountains. The monument was inaugurated in July 1975 and was completed by the sculptor Jacinto Higueras Cátedra. It is a homage to the figure of the miner and is considered the town's most emblematic monument, often serving as a meeting place for many Guardenses.

=== Ayuntamiento de Guardo (Town Hall) ===
In November 2018, 11 years after the demolition of the old town hall, Guardo's new administrative building was inaugurated and is also home to a police station and an auditorium with capacity for 400 people.

Parque Fuentes Carrionas ('Source of the Carrión' Park)

A small park situated west of the town centre on the banks of the Carrión river. It takes its name from Fuentes Carrionas, a glacial lake that constitutes the traditional source of this river.

== Economy ==
The town's main economic activity was coal mining, an industry that commenced several decades after the heavy mining operations in the neighbouring Asturias and León provinces since the coal in Guardo was found deeper into the ground and one had to await for the appropriate technological advances.

In 1942 an important chemical industrial plant owned by Unión Explosivos Río Tinto was constructed in the town and was in operation for over four decades. Initially, the factory comprised numerous buildings, which over time were demolished to the small number still standing today. This factory closed for good in May 2008, with its last owner being the US multinational company Celanese.

== Notable people ==
- Ana José Cancio (1960-), Journalist at TVE and RNE
- Francisco Díaz Santos Bullón (1687-1764), priest and statesman: Archbishop of Burgos, Bishop of both Sigüenza and Barcelona and Governor of the Consejo de Castilla
- Jesús Landáburu (1955-), ex-footballer for Real Valladolid, Rayo Vallecano, FC Barcelona and Atlético Madrid who also briefly played for the Spanish national team
- Claudio Prieto (1934-2015), Classical composer born in Muñeca. The main site of Guardo's secondary school, IES Guardo, was formerly named after him.
