= Sil (river) =

River in León and Galicia, Spain

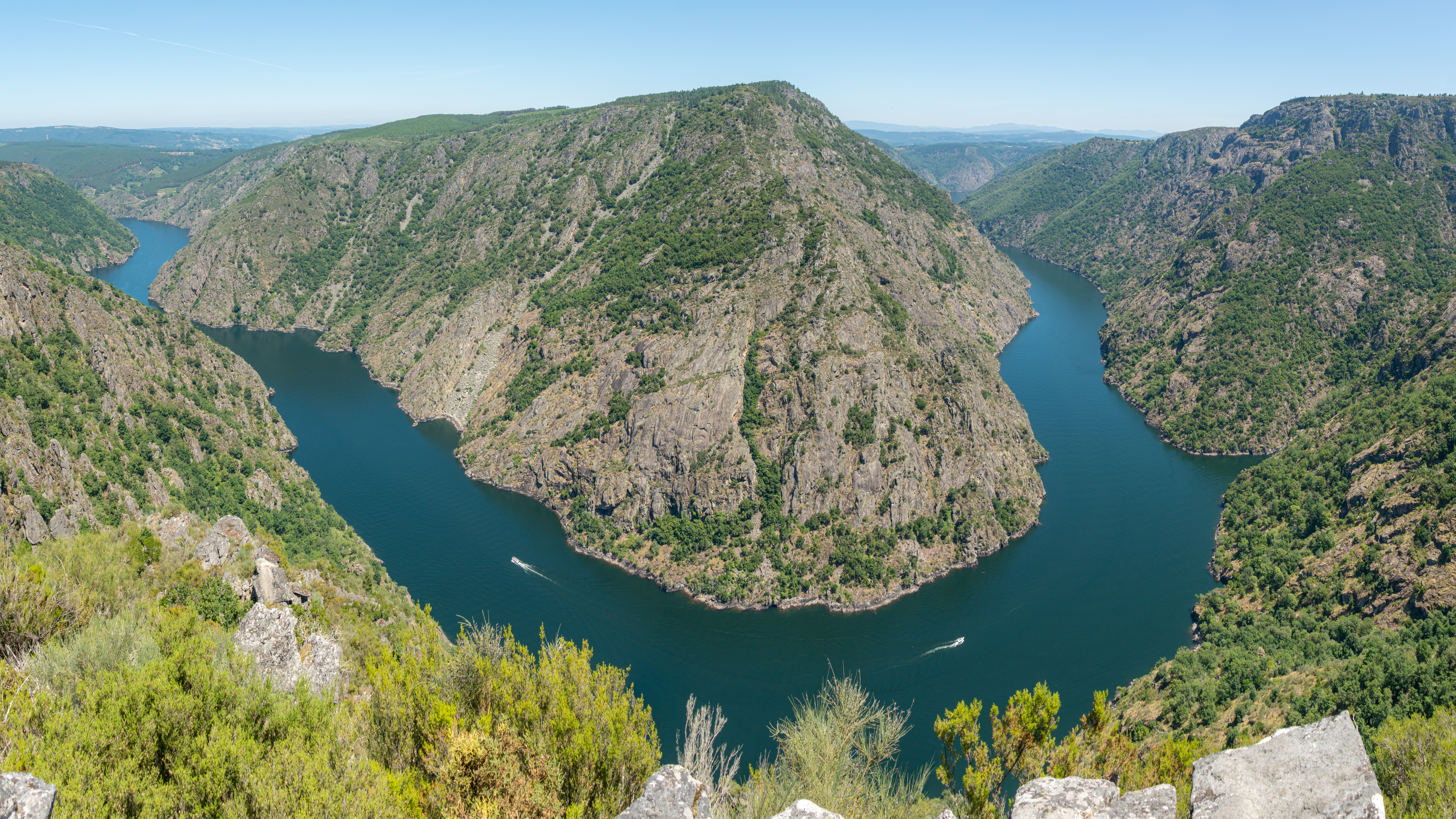
- The Sil Canyon as seen from the Vilouxe lookout.

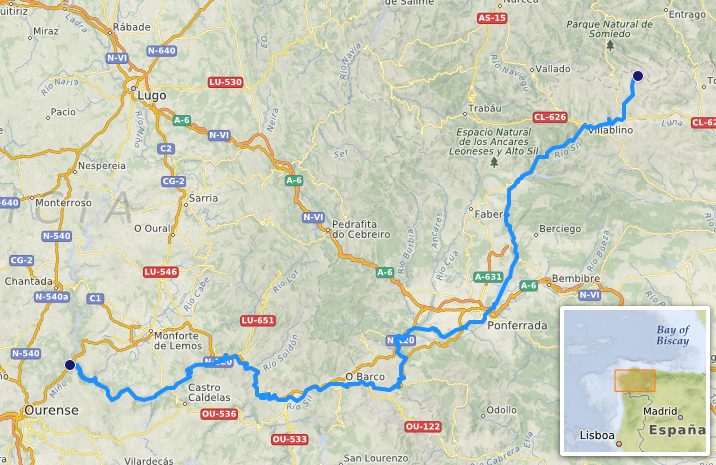
- Path of the Sil
- Native name: Río Sil (Spanish)

Location
- Country: Spain
- Autonomous Community: Castilla y Leon, Galicia
- City: Ponferrada

Physical characteristics
- Source: La Cueta, Cabrillanes
  - location: León, Castilla y León, Spain
  - coordinates: 43.031615°N 6.155348°W
- Source confluence: Os Peares
  - location: Ourense, Galicia, Spain
  - coordinates: 42.453844°N 7.729912°W
- Mouth: Miño Estuary
  - location: Atlantic Ocean, Spain
  - elevation: 0 m (0 ft)
- Length: 228 km (142 mi)

Basin features
- Progression: Minho→ Atlantic Ocean
- Tributaries
  - left: Boeza, Cabrera, Bibei, Navea, Mao
  - right: Caboalles, Cúa, Selmo, Soldón, Lor, Cabe
- Reservoirs: Las Rozas, Bárcena, Peñarrubia, Pumares, Santiago, San Martiño, Sequeiros, Santo Estevo, San Pedro ou Pombeiros

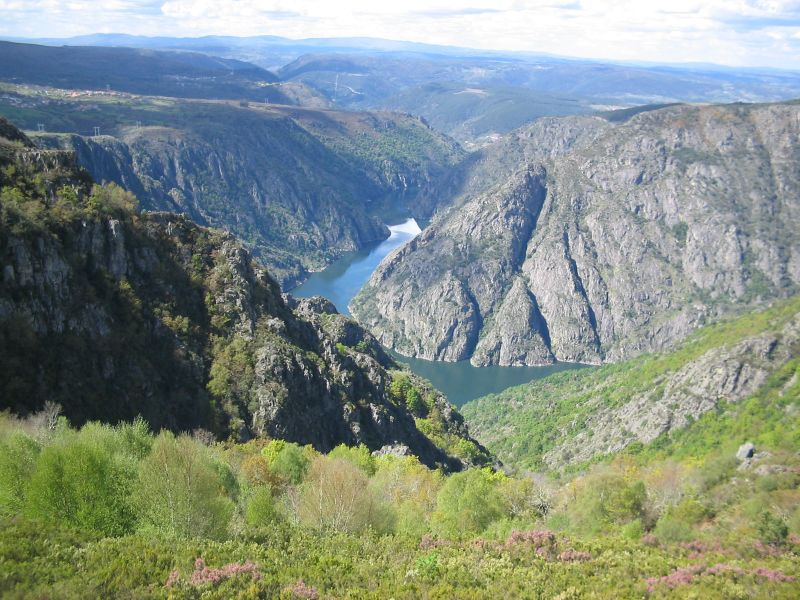
Sil River

The Sil is a river in León (Castile and León) and Galicia, Spain, a tributary of the Miño. Its total length is 225 kilometres (140 mi). The source of the Sil is in the Cantabrian Mountains, in La Cueta part of the Leonese municipality of Cabrillanes. It flows through the provinces of León and Ourense. The largest city on the Sil is Ponferrada (León). The Sil flows into the Miño upstream from Ourense.

== Mouth ==
The river joins the Miño river in Os Peares, in the province of Ourense.

Generally, the hierarchy between rivers is performed by taking into account which junction has more volume and length. In this case, as with the Esla and Pisuerga with the Duero, the Sil has flows larger than the Miño at the junction. There is a saying that goes, "The Miño has the fame, but the Sil gives it water" (in Spanish, El Miño lleva la fama y el Sil le da el agua). The Sil river also surpasses the Miño in length by about 20 kilometres (12 mi).

== Course ==
The Sil runs through the León districts of Babia, Laciana, El Bierzo and La Cabrera, and Ourense Valdeorras, among other locations across Villablino, Ponferrada, O Barco de Valdeorras, A Rúa, Quiroga and Ribas de Sil.

== Tributaries ==
- Left bank: Valseco, Boeza, Oza, Cabrera, Bibei, Navea and Mao.
- Right bank: Caboalles, Valdeprado, Barredos, Cúa, Burbia, Selmo, Soldón, Lor and Cabe.

== Gold deposits ==
The river has been a rich source of alluvial gold, and was most extensively exploited during the Roman period, following the conquest of north-west Spain by Augustus in 25 BC. The upper reaches of the river possessed large placer deposits, and the region around Las Médulas yielded large amounts of gold. It was extracted using hydraulic mining, involving the building of numerous aqueducts to expose and wash the alluvial formations.

== Etymology ==
According to Pokorny and to E. Bascuas, "Sil" would belong to the old European hydronymy, derived from the Indoeuropean root *sei- 'drip, run, humid'.

== See also ==
- List of rivers of Spain
- Rivers of Galicia
