= Unión Minera del Norte =

Spain's leading coal mining company

Unión Minera del Norte, S.A.
- UMINSA
- Predecessor: CARLENOR
- Formation: 1998
- Type: S.A.
- Purpose: Mining
- Headquarters: C/ Don Quijote, 3 Madrid, Spain
- Region served: León, Palencia and Asturias
- Services: 0510 Mining of anthracite and hard coal
- President: Victorino Alonso García
- Production: >2.000.000 t
- Ranking: Among the top 25 companies of the CNAE.
- Budget: >60.000 €
- Staff: 1.500

Unión Minera del Norte, S.A., also known by its acronym UMINSA, is Spain's leading company in the coal mining sector, with operations in the mining basins of León, Palencia and Asturias. It is owned by the controversial businessman from León, Victorino Alonso, and its registered office is in Madrid. It has a production of more than 2,000,000 tons of coal per year and employs nearly 1,500 workers.

In 2018, the company went into liquidation.

== History ==
Victorino Alonso's takeoff in the mining sector began when he acquired Minero Siderúrgica de Ponferrada in 1994, a company that was in technical bankruptcy and owned by Caja España, one of its creditors. Already in 1989, Alonso became a shareholder of Hullas de Barruelo, which exploited the coal mining area of the Rubagón region, in Barruelo de Santullán (Palencia).

In 1994, through its company Lexomosa, it absorbed Carbonia and Minas de Ventana, forming Carbones León Norte, S.A. (CARLENOR). In March 1998, CARLENOR changed its name to Unión Minera del Norte, S.A. (UMINSA) to acquire, three months later, Antracitas de Fabero, Antracitas de Brañuelas, Mina de Fontoria, Explotaciones Mineras de Caboalles, Minas Santa Leocadia and all of Hullas de Barruelo.

In 1999, it purchased almost the entire Palencia mining basin, formed at that time by Antracitas de Velilla, in Velilla del Río Carrión, Antracitas del Norte in Aviñante and Velilla de Tarilonte, Sociedad Minera San Luis de Guardo, Antracitas de San Claudio (which had closed its last subway mine a few months before) in Castrejón de la Peña and Antracitas de Montebismo in La Pernía. Only Carbones San Isidro, with a small operation in Velilla del Río Carrión, remained outside the domain of Victorino Alonso's group. By 2010, Alonso had closed all these exploitations, keeping only "Las Cuevas" pit in Velilla del Río Carrión and two open pit mines in Guardo and Castrejón de la Peña open, and employing only about 150 workers. In 2012 it announced the closure of the "Las Cuevas" pit, and the transfer of its 80 employees to Tinéu.

In the province of León, UMINSA absorbed Antracitas de Fabero in 1997 and Coto Minero del Sil in 2000, as well as the entire basin of the Laciana and Torre del Bierzo region, including operations such as Mina Mora Primera and Sociedad Santa Bárbara, both in the area of Piedrafita de Babia. Thus, in 2003, the company had 1,053 employees in the province of León. In 2010 it closed the San Miguel group in Laciana, significantly reducing the number of mining operations in this region of Leon. In 2011 it closed the Brañuelas mine in Torre del Bierzo, so that in El Bierzo, after the closure of the Santa Cruz group in Páramo del Sil in 2012 it only maintains the open pit of Fabero with 250 workers and the Salgueiro Group in Torre del Bierzo. In 2014 it only kept open in the Bierzo area the Salgueiro Group and the open pit Gran Corta de Fabero.

In 2003, the company acquired Coto Minero del Narcea and Antracitas de Tinéu in Asturias. In 2011, it closed Coto Narcea in Monasterio and Antisa in Tinéu, so in 2012 it only had the Pilotuerto mine in Tinéu. In 2014, only the Pilotuerto mine in Tinéu remains in operation. It also keeps some layers of the Cerredo inland mine owned by Minera AsturLeonesa in operation, although this agreement is in the process of being dissolved.

In 2010, UMINSA was the main private company in the mining sector in Spain, ahead of Coto Minero Cantábrico, which is also owned by Victorino Alonso and which arose in 2008 as a result of the merger of Minero Siderúrgica de Ponferrada and Hullas del Coto Cortés, with activity in the Asturian basin.

UMINSA has received from different sectors accusations of capturing its profits thanks to state aid to coal mining. In 2010, the company received 81.6 million euros in aid to the sector from the state.

In July 2013, the company entered voluntary insolvency proceedings, due to its high debt, and in 2018 into liquidation as a step prior to its dissolution.

== Properties ==
UMINSA's annexes by province and year of acquisition are as follows:

=== Province of León ===
- 1998: Antracitas de Fabero, Antracitas de Brañuelas, Minera de Fontoria, Minas Santa Leocadia, Explotaciones Mineras Caboalles and Minas de Lumajo.
- 1999: Antracitas La Silva.
- 2000: Minera de Torre.
- 2002: Coto Minero del Sil, Mina Mora and Sociedad Santa Bárbara.
- 2003: Minas y Expl. Industriales, Carbones El Túnel, Industrias Carfema and Minas del Bierzo.
- 2004: Antracitas de La Granja, Antracitas de Arlanza, Adelina Mine and Los Compadres Mine.
- 2009: Campomanes Hermanos and Virgilio Riesco.

=== Province of Palencia ===
- 1998: Hullas de Barruelo
- 1999: Antracitas de Velilla, Sociedad Minera San Luis, Antracitas del Norte, Antracitas San Claudio and Antracitas de Montebismo.

=== Asturias ===
- 2004: Coto Minero del Narcea and Antracitas de Tinéu.
- 2008: González y Díez S.A. (Tinéu).

== Controversy ==
UMINSA's methods have been criticized by both trade unions and environmental groups, due to the non-payment of the miners' salaries as a means of pressure to receive public funds on the one hand, and the exploitation of open-pit mines in protected areas in the provinces of León and Palencia on the other. In addition, Victorino Alonso's business network has aroused the suspicions of various groups, who maintain that his sole objective in leading the sector is to obtain state subsidies and to close the mines. Thus, in 1996 he was the subject of an investigation by the judicial police unit of the Guardia Civil which revealed possible fraud and an unjustified increase in assets, although the Ministry of Industry subsequently informed that it would not initiate investigations into his alleged irregularities.
