= Tebaida leonesa =

Tebaida leonesa or Tebaida berciana is a historical site located in El Bierzo, Spanish municipality of Ponferrada, province of León, Spain.

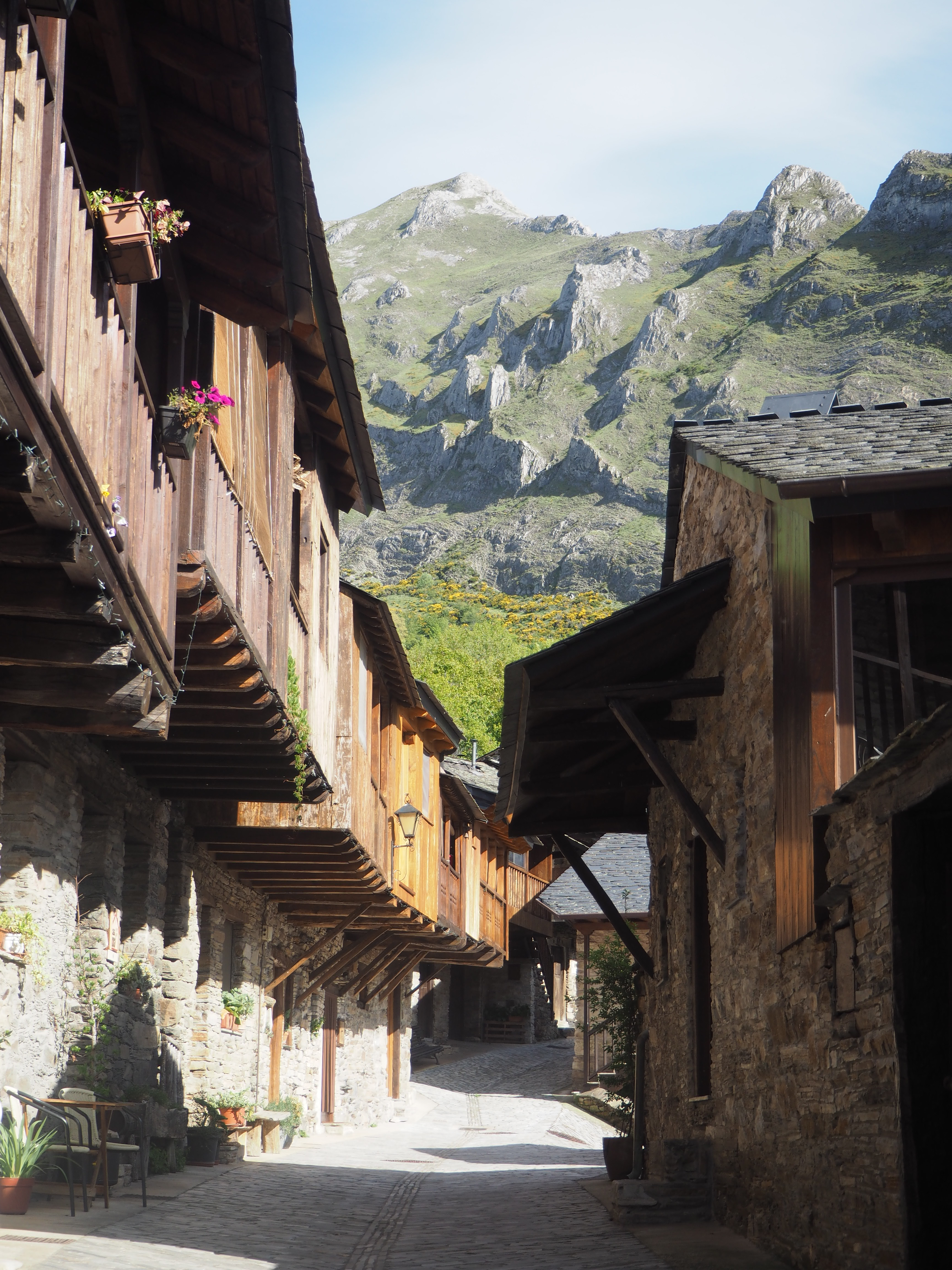

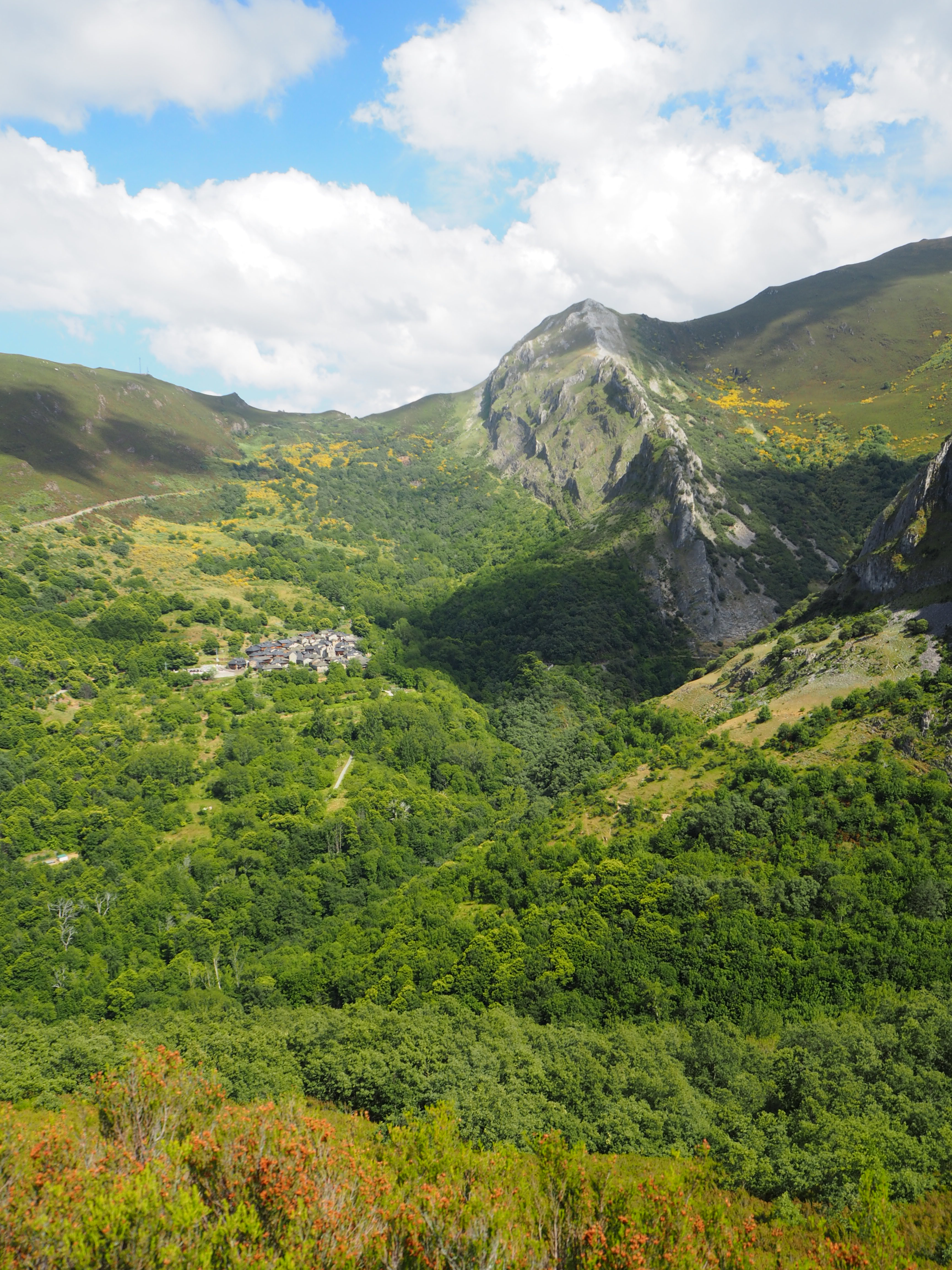
Valle del Silencio

This area includes the villages of San Pedro de Montes and Peñalba de Santiago. From the 4th century onward, early Christian hermits settled here devoted to prayer and meditation. The name "Tebaida" comes from a comparison with Upper Egypt, where the Eastern cenobitic monastic tradition first developed. This comparison was described by Enrique Flórez in his work "España Sagrada".
