= Riera de Babia =

La Riera de Babia
- Locality
- Location within Province of León Location within Castile and León Location within Spain
- Coordinates: 42°58′1″N 6°7′39″W
- Country: Spain
- Autonomous community: Castile and León
- Province: Province of León
- Municipality: Cabrillanes
- Elevation: 1,316 m (4,318 ft)

Population
  - Total: 26

La Riera de Babia (Astur-Leonese: La Riera) is a locality located in the municipality of Cabrillanes, in the province of León, Castile and León, Spain. As of 2020, it has a population of 26.

== Geography ==
La Riera de Babia is located 85km northwest of León, Spain.
