= Torre de Babia =

- Locality
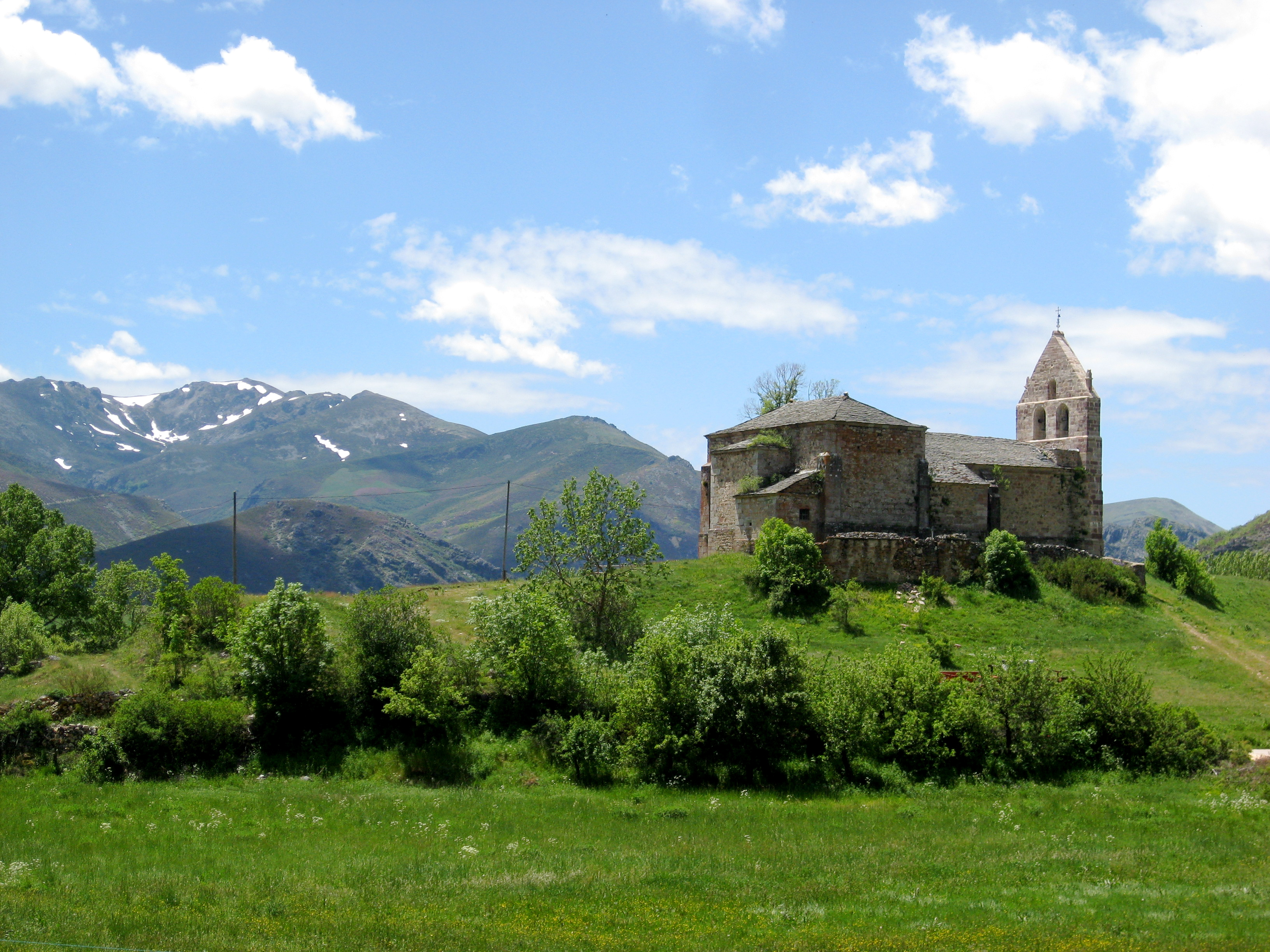

- Location within Province of León Location within Castile and León Location within Spain
- Coordinates: 42°58′55″N 6°6′34″W
- Country: Spain
- Autonomous community: Castile and León
- Province: Province of León
- Municipality: Cabrillanes
- Elevation: 1,307 m (4,288 ft)

Population
  - Total: 31

Torre de Babia (Astur-Leonese: Torre) is a locality located in the municipality of Cabrillanes, in the province of León, Castile and León, Spain. As of 2020, it has a population of 31.

== Geography ==
Torre de Babia is located 87km northwest of León, Spain.
