= Quintanilla de Babia =

- Locality
- Location within Province of León Location within Castile and León Location within Spain
- Coordinates: 42°56′26″N 6°10′37″W
- Country: Spain
- Autonomous community: Castile and León
- Province: Province of León
- Municipality: Cabrillanes
- Elevation: 1,288 m (4,226 ft)

Population
  - Total: 151

Quintanilla de Babia (Astur-Leonese: Quintanieḷḷa) is a locality located in the municipality of Cabrillanes, in the province of León, Castile and León, Spain. As of 2020, it has a population of 151.

== Geography ==
Quintanilla de Babia is located 91km northwest of León, Spain.
