= Las Murias de Babia =

- Locality
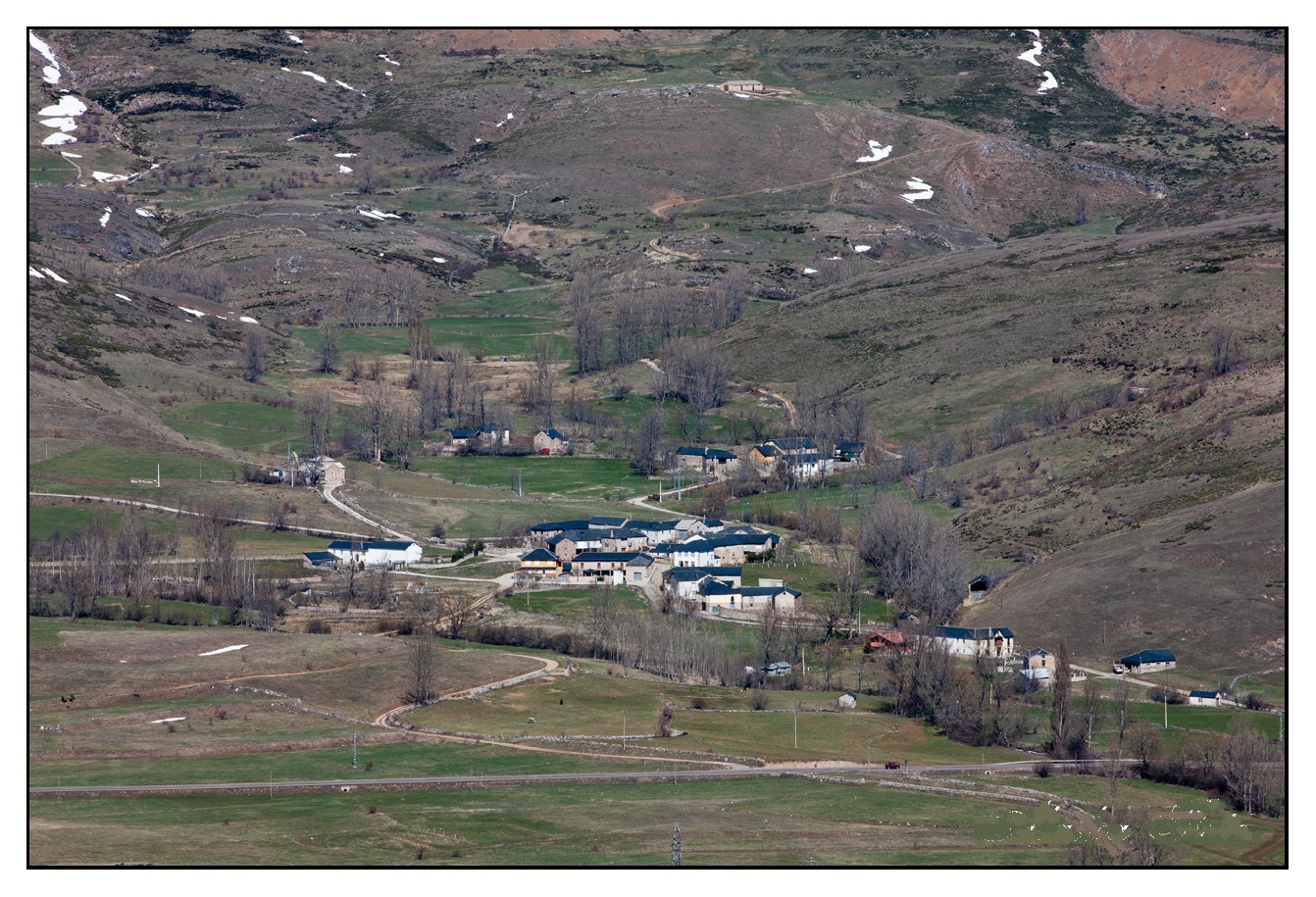

- Location within Province of León Location within Castile and León Location within Spain
- Coordinates: 42°57′25″N 6°9′44″W
- Country: Spain
- Autonomous community: Castile and León
- Province: Province of León
- Municipality: Cabrillanes
- Elevation: 1,278 m (4,193 ft)

Population
  - Total: 23

Las Murias de Babia (Astur-Leonese: Las Murias) is a locality located in the municipality of Cabrillanes, in the province of León, Castile and León, Spain. As of 2020, it has a population of 23.

== Geography ==
Las Murias is located 87km northwest of León, Spain.
