= Santa Marina del Sil =

Coordinates: 42°40′N 6°30′W

Santa Marina del Sil is a village situated by the river Sil, 7 km from the town of Congosto in Spain, and 15 km from the town of Ponferrada, in the province of León, in Spain. Its name refers to Saint Marina.

The village has 85 inhabitants and is located near the Sil River, a tributary of the Miño River.

It is best known for the summer event La Carpa, held in July. This popular fishing contest takes place on the river near the village and attracts participants from the surrounding region. The event is organized by the Centro de Iniciativas Turísticas (CIT), or Tourist Initiative Center, which was founded by a local resident, Ángel González.

Historically, the village’s economy was based on coal mining and chestnut harvesting. Today, most residents are either retired or work in nearby towns such as Ponferrada and Toreno.

There is a Catholic church in the village.
