= Mena de Babia =

- Locality
- Location within Province of León Location within Castile and León Location within Spain
- Coordinates: 42°56′47″N 6°8′19″W
- Country: Spain
- Autonomous community: Castile and León
- Province: Province of León
- Municipality: Cabrillanes
- Elevation: 1,260 m (4,130 ft)

Population
  - Total: 36

Mena de Babia (Astur-Leonese: Mena) is a hamlet located in the municipality of Cabrillanes, in the province of León, Castile and León, Spain. As of 2020, it has a population of 36.

== Geography ==
Mena de Babia is located 86km northwest of León, Spain.
