= Huergas de Babia =

- Locality
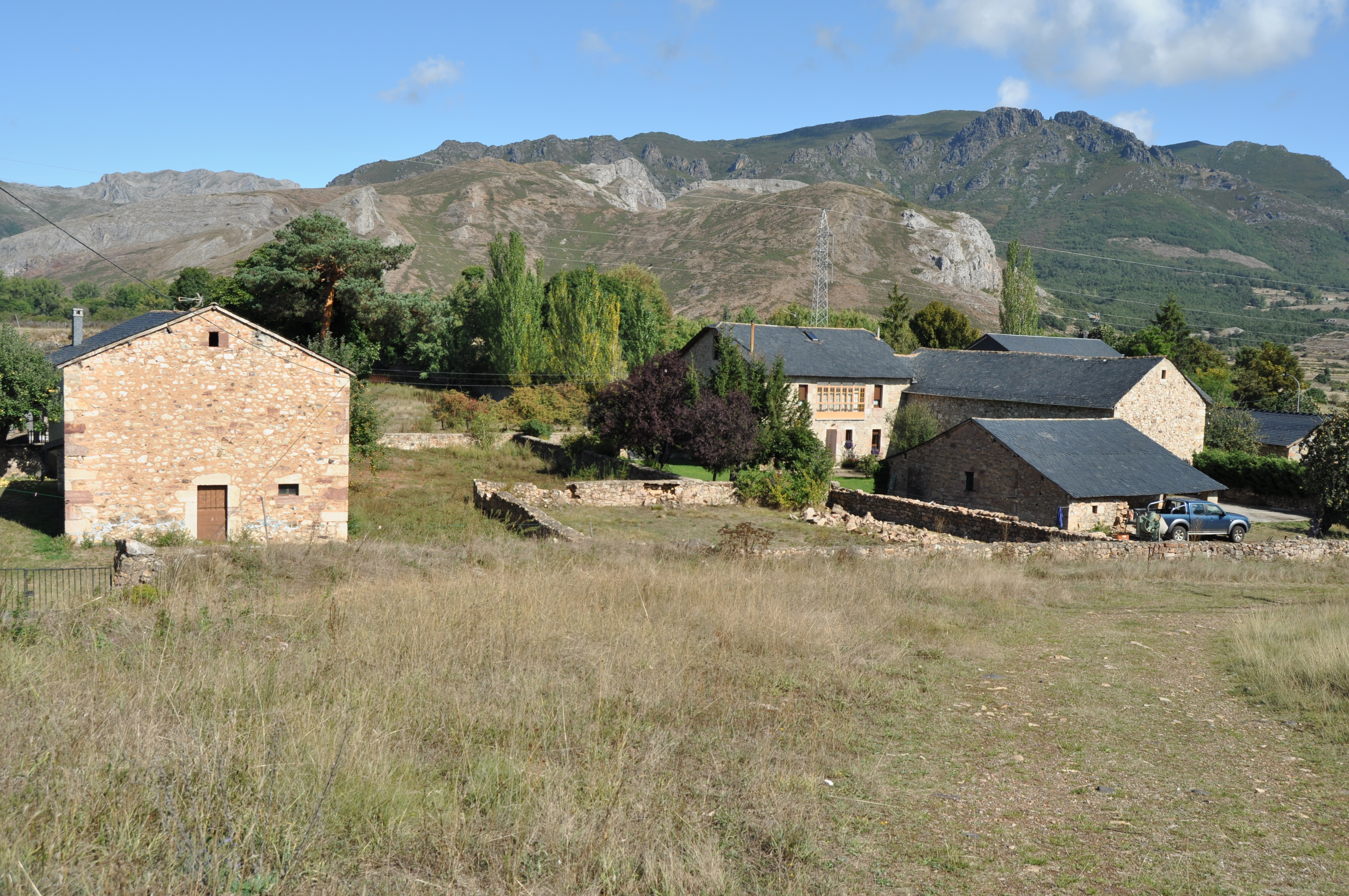

- Location within Province of León Location within Castile and León Location within Spain
- Coordinates: 42°57′21″N 6°5′33″W
- Country: Spain
- Autonomous community: Castile and León
- Province: Province of León
- Municipality: Cabrillanes
- Elevation: 1,221 m (4,006 ft)

Population
  - Total: 65

Huergas de Babia (Astur-Leonese: Güergas) is a locality located in the municipality of Cabrillanes, in the province of León, Castile and León, Spain. As of 2020, it has a population of 65.

== Geography ==
Huergas de Babia is located 81km northwest of León, Spain.
