= San Félix de Arce =

- Locality
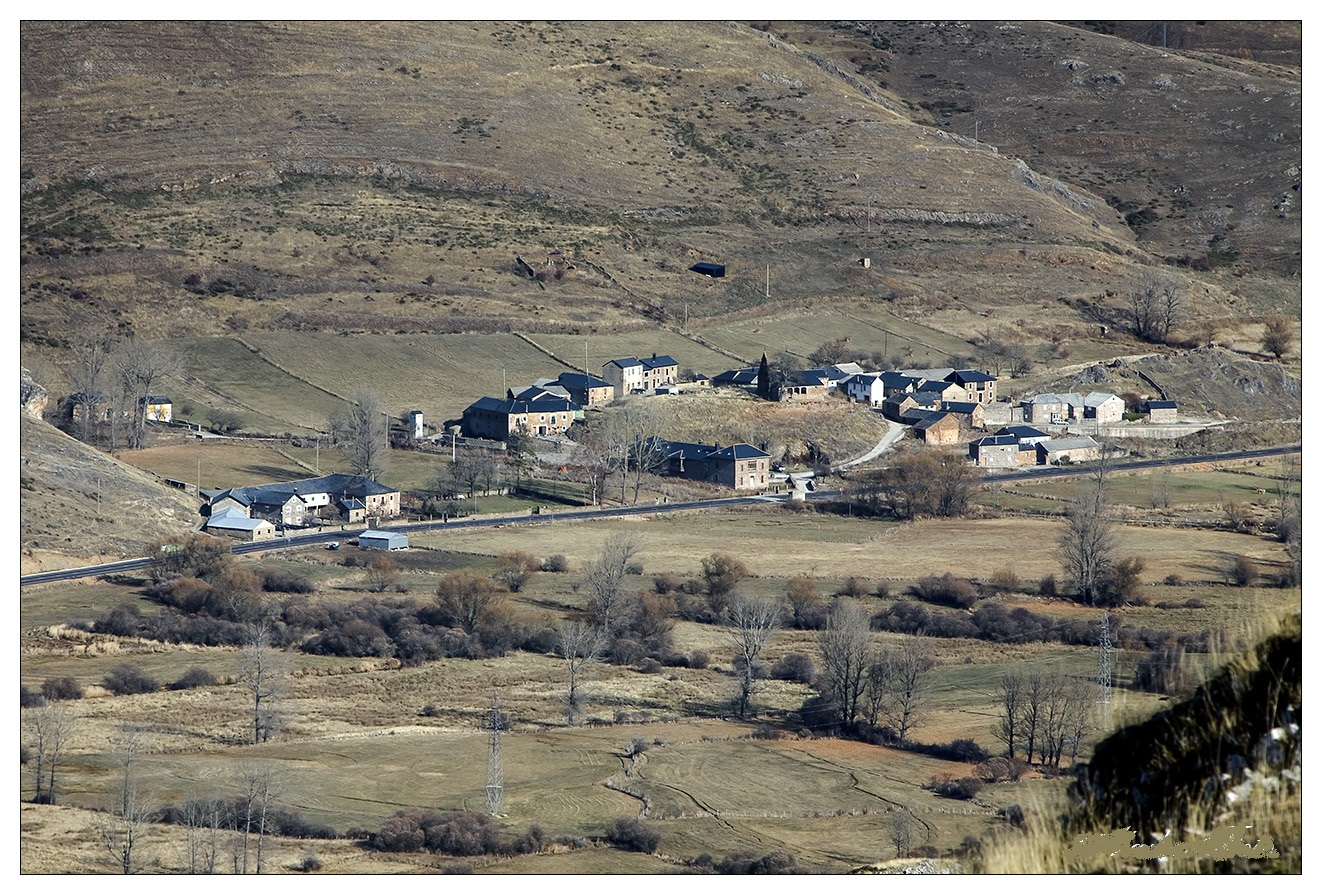

- Location within Province of León Location within Castile and León Location within Spain
- Coordinates: 42°57′27″N 6°7′51″W
- Country: Spain
- Autonomous community: Castile and León
- Province: Province of León
- Municipality: Cabrillanes
- Elevation: 1,244 m (4,081 ft)

Population
  - Total: 22

San Félix de Arce (Astur-Leonese: San Feles) is a locality located in the municipality of Cabrillanes, in the province of León, Castile and León, Spain. As of 2020, it has a population of 22.

== Geography ==
San Félix de Arce is located 84km northwest of León, Spain.
