= El Bierzo =

Coordinates: 42°40′N 6°45′W

- Comarca
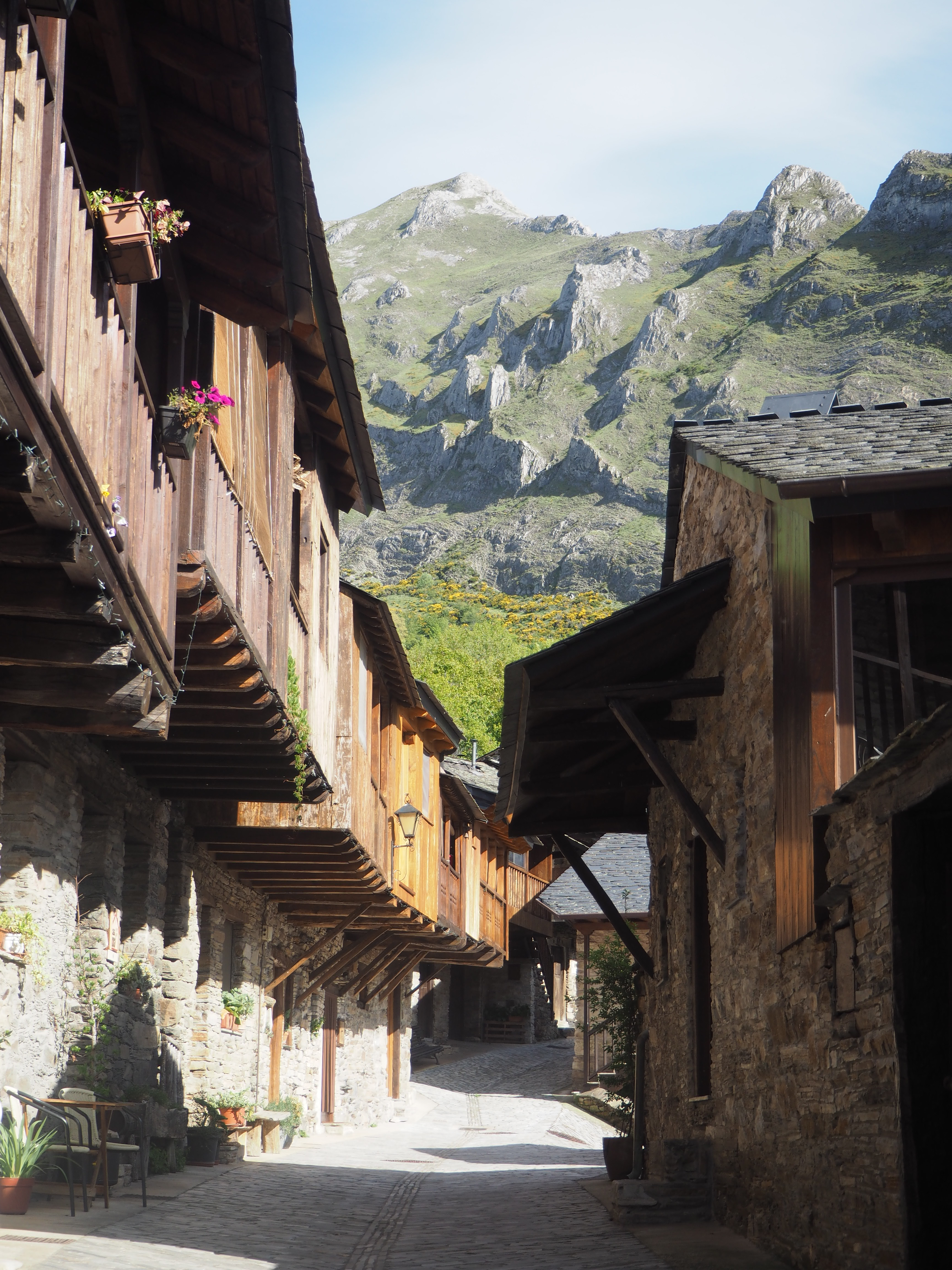

- Flag Coat of arms

- Location of El Bierzo within León and within the Autonomous community of Castile and León
- Country: Spain
- Autonomous community: Castile and León
- Province: León
- Capital: Ponferrada

Area
  - Total: 2,828 km^{2} (1,092 sq mi)

Population
  - Total: 134,729
  - Density: 47.64/km^{2} (123.4/sq mi)
- Time zone: UTC+1 (CET)
  - Summer (DST): UTC+2 (CEST)
- Largest municipality: Ponferrada

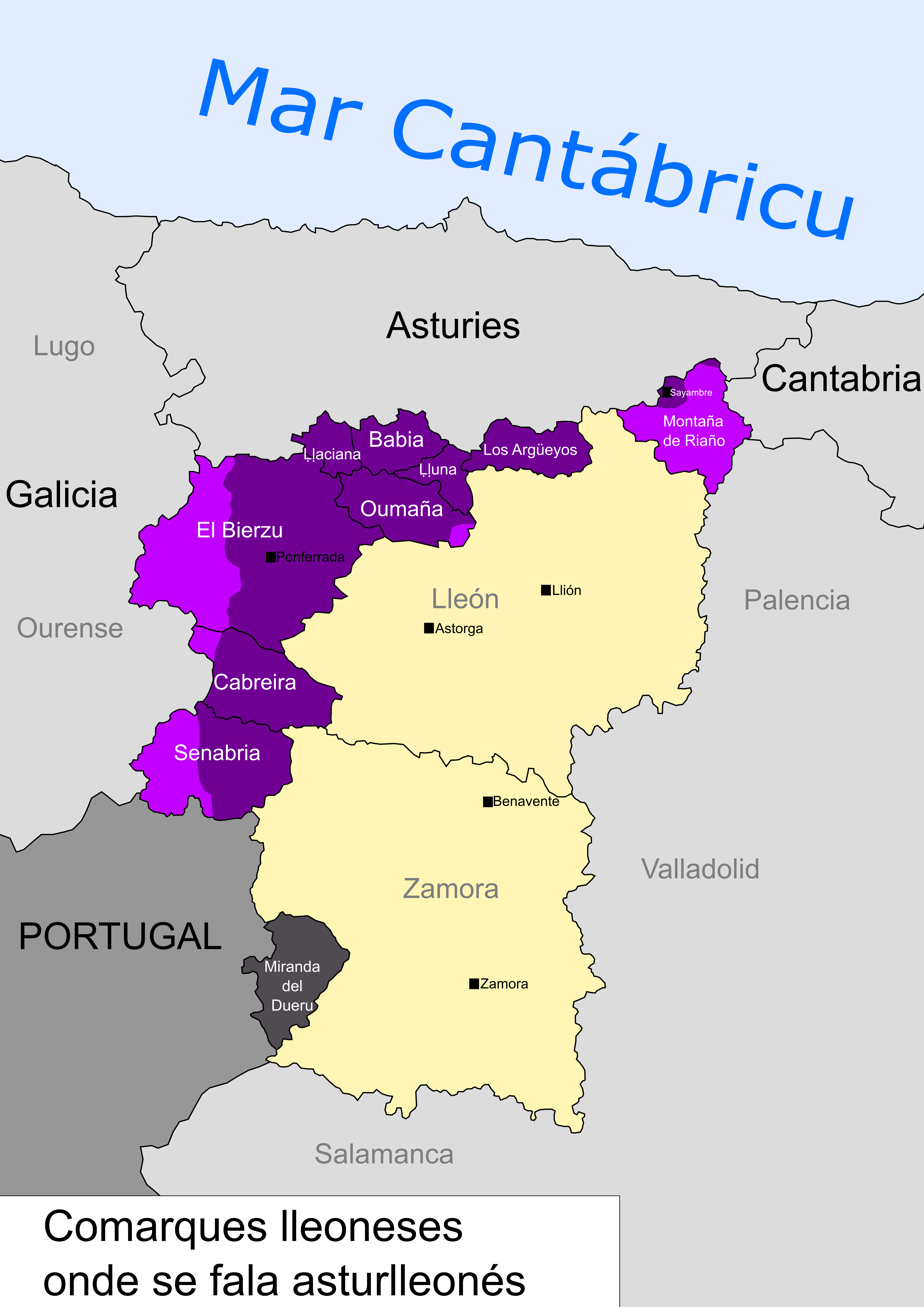
Leonese comarcas where Asturleonese or Galician are spoken.

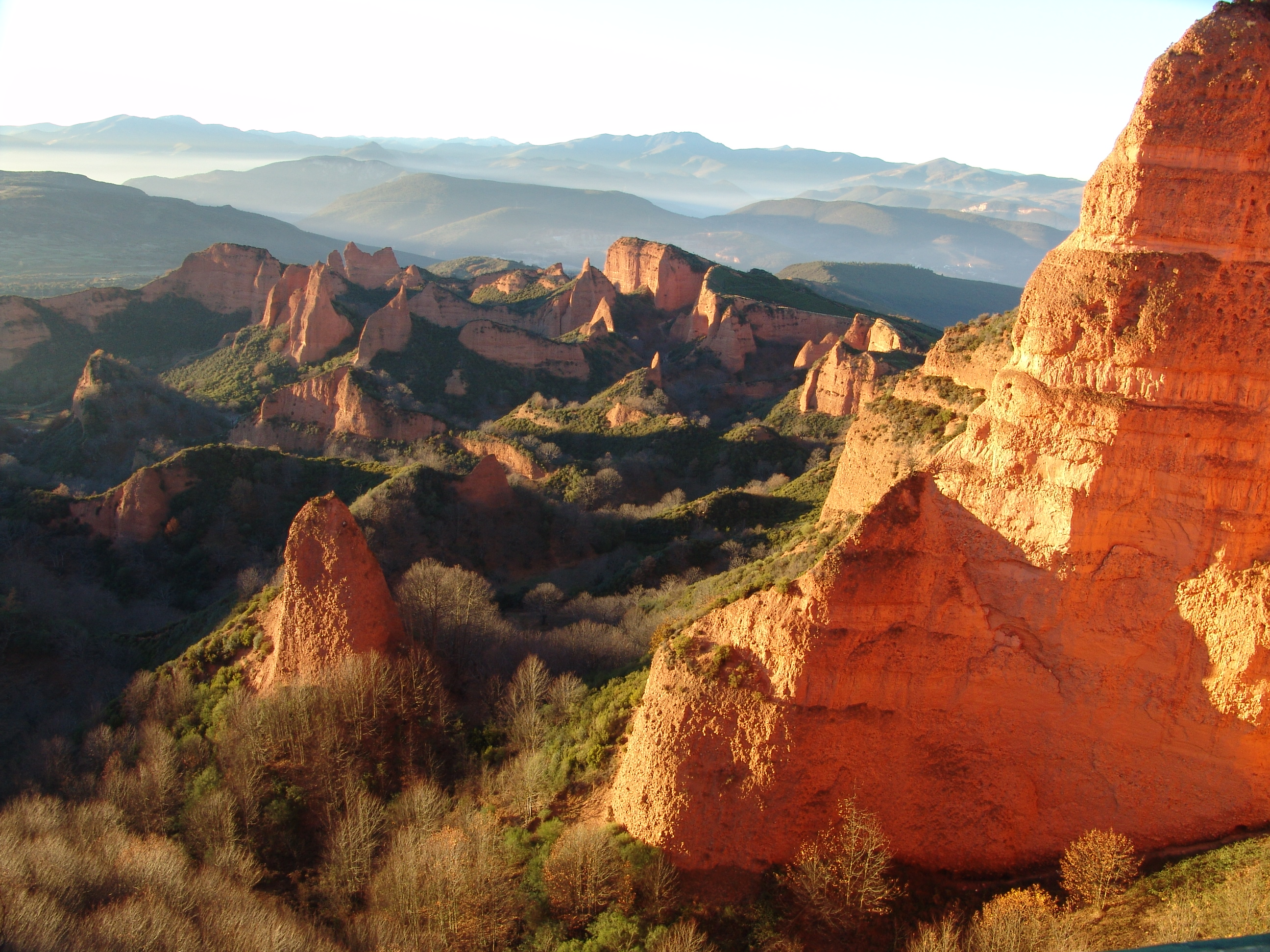
Panoramic view of Las Médulas World Heritage Site

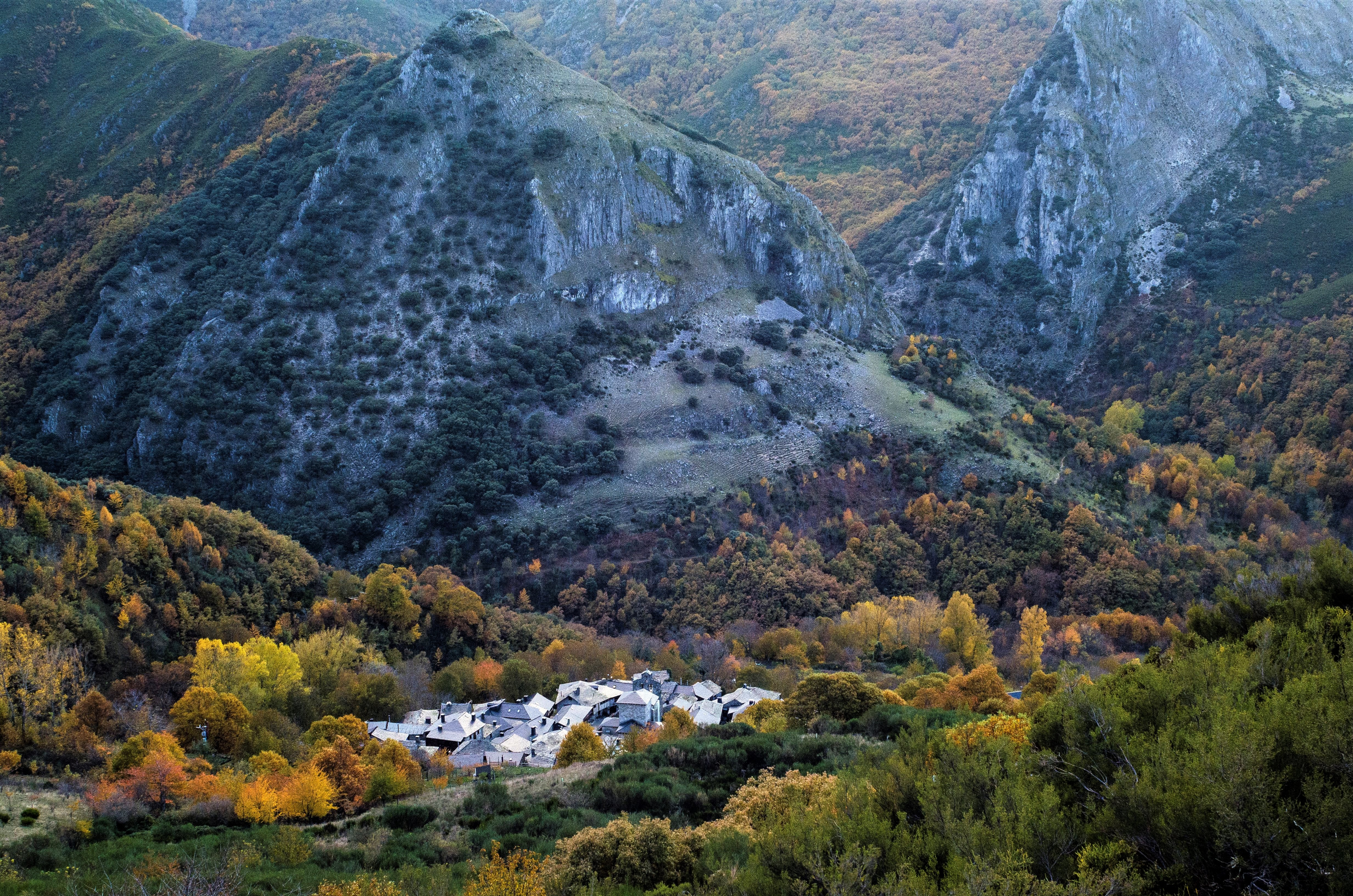
Peñalba de Santiago, a medieval village in Montes Aquilanos.

El Bierzo (Spanish pronunciation: [el ˈβjeɾ.θo]; Leonese: El Bierciu or El Bierzu; Galician: O Bierzo) is a comarca in the province of León, Spain. Its capital is the town of Ponferrada. Other major towns are Bembibre and Villafranca del Bierzo, the historical capital.

The territory of El Bierzo includes most of the upper basin of the Sil river. It is surrounded by mountains on all sides, which makes this area remarkably isolated from all neighbouring lands.

== History ==
In pre-Roman times the region was populated by the Astures, a Hispano-Celtic Gallaecian people. They were conquered by Emperor Augustus in the Astur-Cantabrian Wars (29–19 BC), and the area quickly became the largest mining center of the Empire during the Roman period, where gold and other metals and minerals were extracted. Numerous Roman mining sites are still visible in the area, one of the most spectacular being Las Médulas, a UNESCO World Heritage Site since 1997. Romans also imported grapevines, and wine production thrived in the region until the propagation of Phylloxera at the end of the 19th century, which destroyed the majority of the vineyards.

In the early Middle Ages, El Bierzo became part of the Kingdom of León. The region saw the establishment of several monasteries, including Santa María de Carracedo and San Pedro de Montes, which played a role in its religious and cultural development. Mozarabic art also flourished in the area, with Santiago de Peñalba standing as a notable example. This church, constructed in the 10th century, is an important representation of Mozarabic architecture and reflects the artistic influences of the time. Fortifications such as the Templar Castle of Ponferrada were also constructed during the Middle Ages, reflecting its strategic importance.

The Camino de Santiago passes through El Bierzo, significantly shaping its historical and cultural landscape. This medieval pilgrimage route brought travelers and religious influence to the region, fostering the development of Romanesque architecture. Notable examples include the Church of Santiago in Villafranca del Bierzo and other ecclesiastical structures that served the needs of pilgrims.

In the 19th century, El Bierzo was briefly a province of its own within the larger Leonese region from 1821 to 1823, with the new administrative division of Spain in 1833 the majority of the region was integrated in the province of León, with the Valdeorras municipalities becoming part of Galicia. The 19th and 20th centuries were marked by industrial developments, with mining and energy production becoming central to the local economy.

El Bierzo developed its own peculiarities as Galician and Leonese traditions mixed under Castilian influence, and thus was granted the administrative status of comarca. Spanish is the official language, but local dialects of Galician and Leonese are also spoken in the westernmost areas and are present in some village toponyms. In the 12th century there was a colony of immigrants from Poitou in the Bierzo.

The status of El Bierzo as a shire is recognized by law, and it is the only one officially recognized in the autonomous community of Castile and León.

== Languages ==
The predominant language nowadays is Spanish but the local vernaculars can be classified as either Galician or Leonese; the Galician traits increase as one moves from east to west. The use of Galician and Leonese in everyday speech has mixed usages. Although both have enjoyed a recent revival through the work of different associations that promote their use and study, Galician has been more favored, extending its area of influence. Leonese continues to have a very limited use.

The Galician language, in addition to Galicia, is also spoken in western El Bierzo and a small area called As Portelas in the westernmost part of the province of Zamora, both areas in the community of Castile and Leon; the teaching of Galician in public education is allowed in those areas under an agreement between the Education Departments of Galicia and Castile and Leon. In 2005–2006 there were 844 students studying in 9 municipalities of El Bierzo, with 47 teachers, and in 2008–2009 more than 1000 students enrolled in Galician courses in El Bierzo and As Portelas, although many of them are children of immigrants from Galicia. In addition to that, the Statute of Autonomy of Castile and Leon, in its article No. 5, states: "[We] Shall respect and protect the Galician language and language patterns in places where the language is habitually used.". The number of Galician speakers in El Bierzo is estimated to be about 35,000 people concentrated in the westernmost municipalities of the region. In the last year the Bercianos have made many campaigns to improve Galicians' use in their Comarca, even with the collaboration of members from the Royal Galician Academy, professors and students from Villafranca del Bierzo. Politically, usually the Galeguist parties defend the use of Galician language in the western Bierzo, parties as Galician Nationalist Bloc or PSdeG, but recently, even right-wing parties like People's Party defend the Galician language in the area.

Pachuezu or patsuezu is the western Asturleonese variant most entrenched in the north of El Bierzo, where there are estimated to be about 4,000 speakers of Leonese.

== Economy ==
The railroad arrived in the region in 1881, and during World War I local tungsten deposits were exploited to supply the arms industry. In 1918 the Ponferrada Mining, Iron and Steel Company (Spanish: Minero Siderúrgica de Ponferrada (MSP)) was founded to exploit coal deposits in the region, and it grew to become Spain's largest coal mining corporation. The Spanish National Energy Corporation (Endesa) was founded in 1944 and in 1949 it opened Spain's first coal-fueled power plant in Ponferrada, Compostilla I. In 1960 the Bárcena Dam (Spanish: Pantano de Bárcena) opened and by the second half of the 20th century the economy of the region was mainly based on mining and electricity generation, both hydroelectric and coal-fueled.

Starting in the late 1980s most mines were closed, and after the collapse of the mining industry the region was for a while in a crisis. However, in the late 1990s the region underwent a major transformation with the establishment of several industrial and services firms, the reintroduction of commercial wine production, the opening of a local branch of the University of León in Ponferrada offering several undergraduate degrees, and in general a radical improvement of the region's infrastructure. The economy is now based mainly on tourism, agriculture (fruit and wine), wind power generation and slate mining.

Important factors contributing to the recent boom of the tourism industry in the region are the increasing popularity of the Way of St. James (Spanish: Camino de Santiago; a pilgrimage route that goes from France to Santiago de Compostela, Galicia), the designation in 1997 of Las Médulas as a UNESCO World Heritage Site and the development of rural tourism lodging and wineries in the area. The Energy City Foundation Spanish: Fundación Ciudad de la Energía was established in Ponferrada in 2006 and is currently overseeing the construction of the National Energy Museum (Spanish: Museo Nacional de la Energía) in the city, as well as sponsoring several other initiatives that should further boost tourism and the economy of the region.

== See also ==
- Tebaida leonesa
- Montes Aquilanos
- Bercian dialect
- Bierzo Edict
- Santa Marina del Sil
- Galicia irredenta
