= Sil Canyon =

Coordinates: 42°24′05″N 7°24′58″W

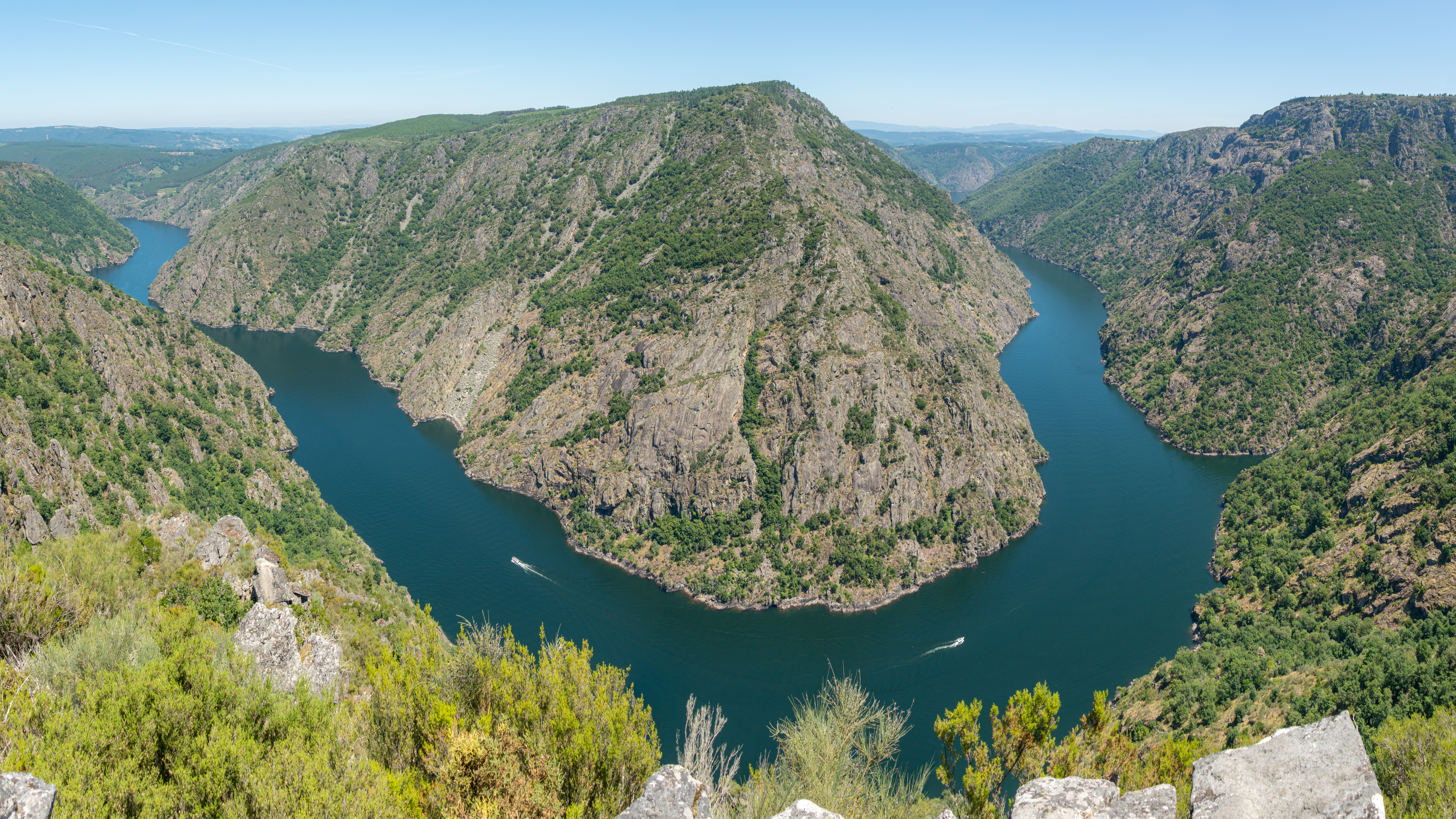
The canyon as seen from the Vilouxe lookout.

The Sil Canyon (Galician: Canón do Sil) is a canyon in Galicia, Spain along the Sil. It covers the last 50 km before the Sil enters the Minho. The scenery is considered to be the most spectacular in Galicia.

The walls rise almost vertically to a height of 500 meters above the water level. Due to the extraordinary terrain, the local climate differs from surrounding areas and allows the growth of Mediterranean vegetation, such as olive trees. The river cliffs have been terraced to allow production of grape vines. Wine production started in this area already in Roman times. The area is called the Ribeira Sacra wine region, and it is the only place in Galicia that produces more red than white wine.

The gorge is classified in Natura 2000 as a site of community importance. It is a home to several rare bird species, and some mammals such as otters and bats.
