= Torre de la Rosaleda =

Building in Ponferrada, Spain

Coordinates: 42.5591°N 6.6097°W

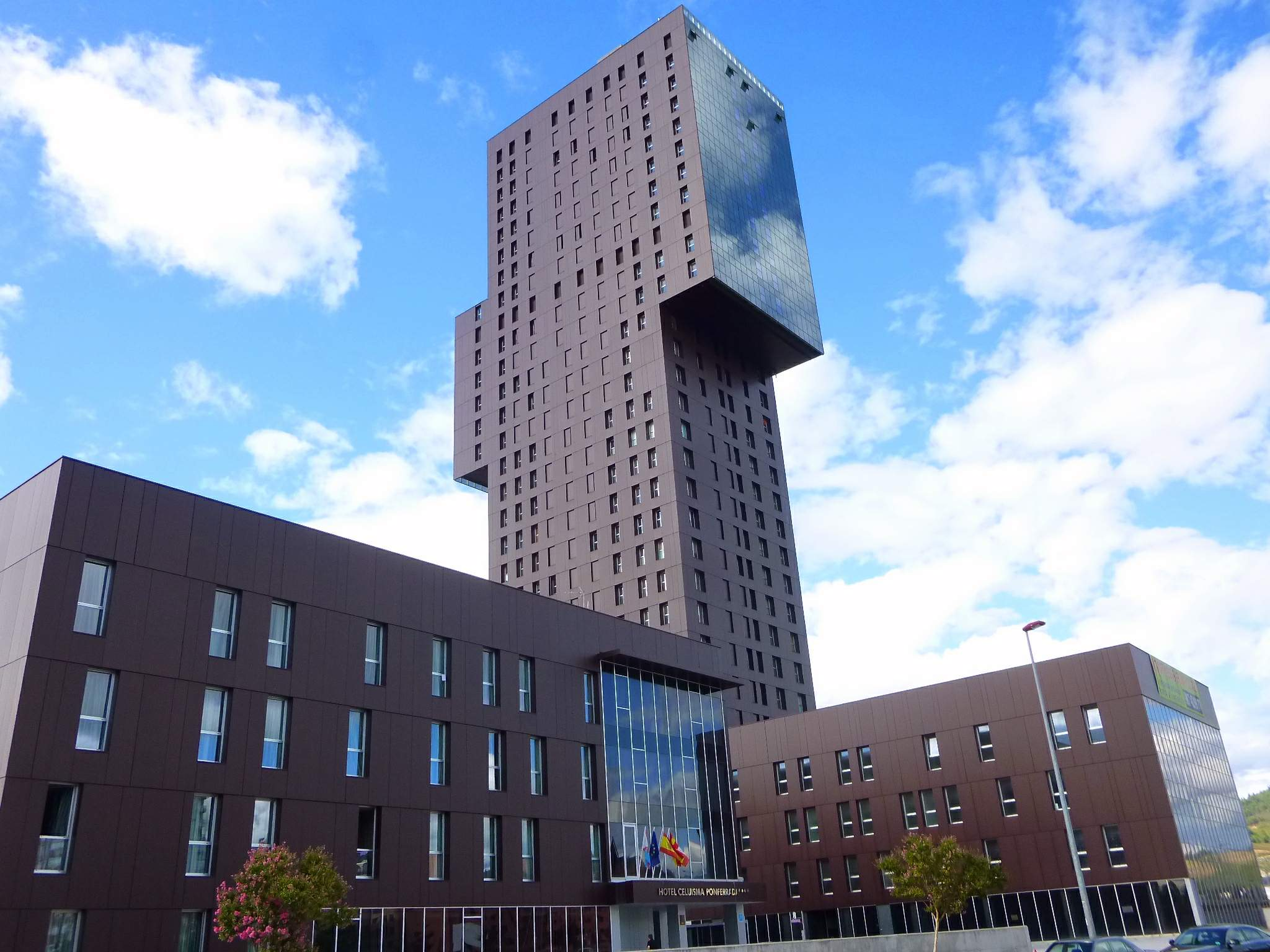
Torre de la Rosaleda

The Torre de la Rosaleda (Tower of the Rose Garden) is a 107-meter (351 ft) tall building in La Rosa District of the city of Ponferrada, Spain. It is the tallest building in the city of Ponferrada and all of Castile and León.

Construction began in 2006 and finished in 2009 by Grupo Begar León group. It is 30 floors and 107 meters tall and has a distinctive shape with projections both east and west on several upper floors. It is the tallest building in the province. The Tower (building's official website) surmounts a 12-story building 80 meters wide and 700 meters long.
