= Lago de Babia =

- Locality
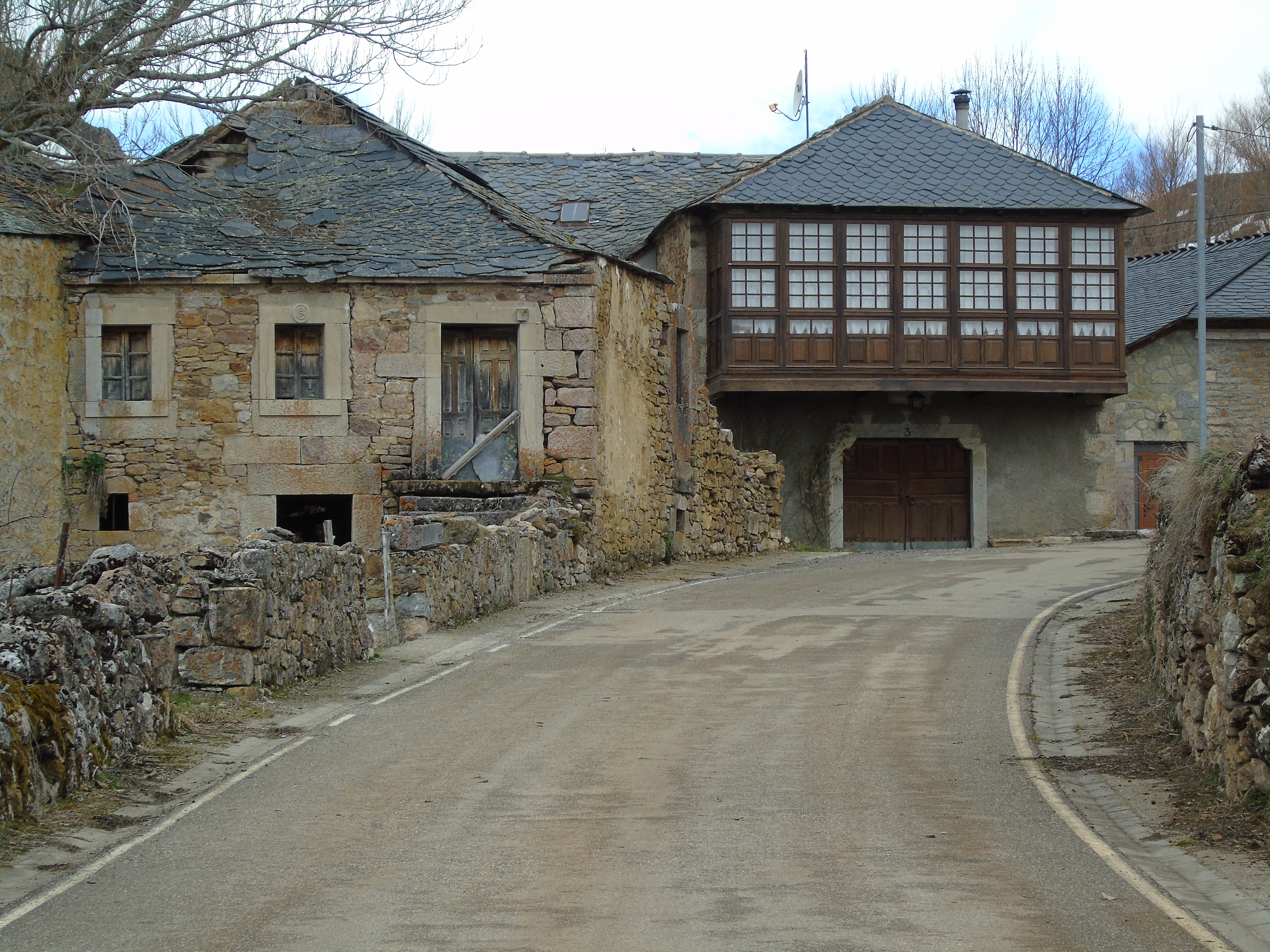

- Location within Province of León Location within Castile and León Location within Spain
- Coordinates: 42°58′10″N 6°10′48″W
- Country: Spain
- Autonomous community: Castile and León
- Province: Province of León
- Municipality: Cabrillanes
- Elevation: 1,345 m (4,413 ft)

Population
  - Total: 24

Lago de Babia (Astur-Leonese: Ḷḷau) is a locality located in the municipality of Cabrillanes, in the province of León, Castile and León, Spain. As of 2020, it has a population of 24.

== Geography ==
Lago de Babia is located 89km northwest of León, Spain.
