= Peñalba de Cilleros =

Peñalba de los Cilleros
- Locality
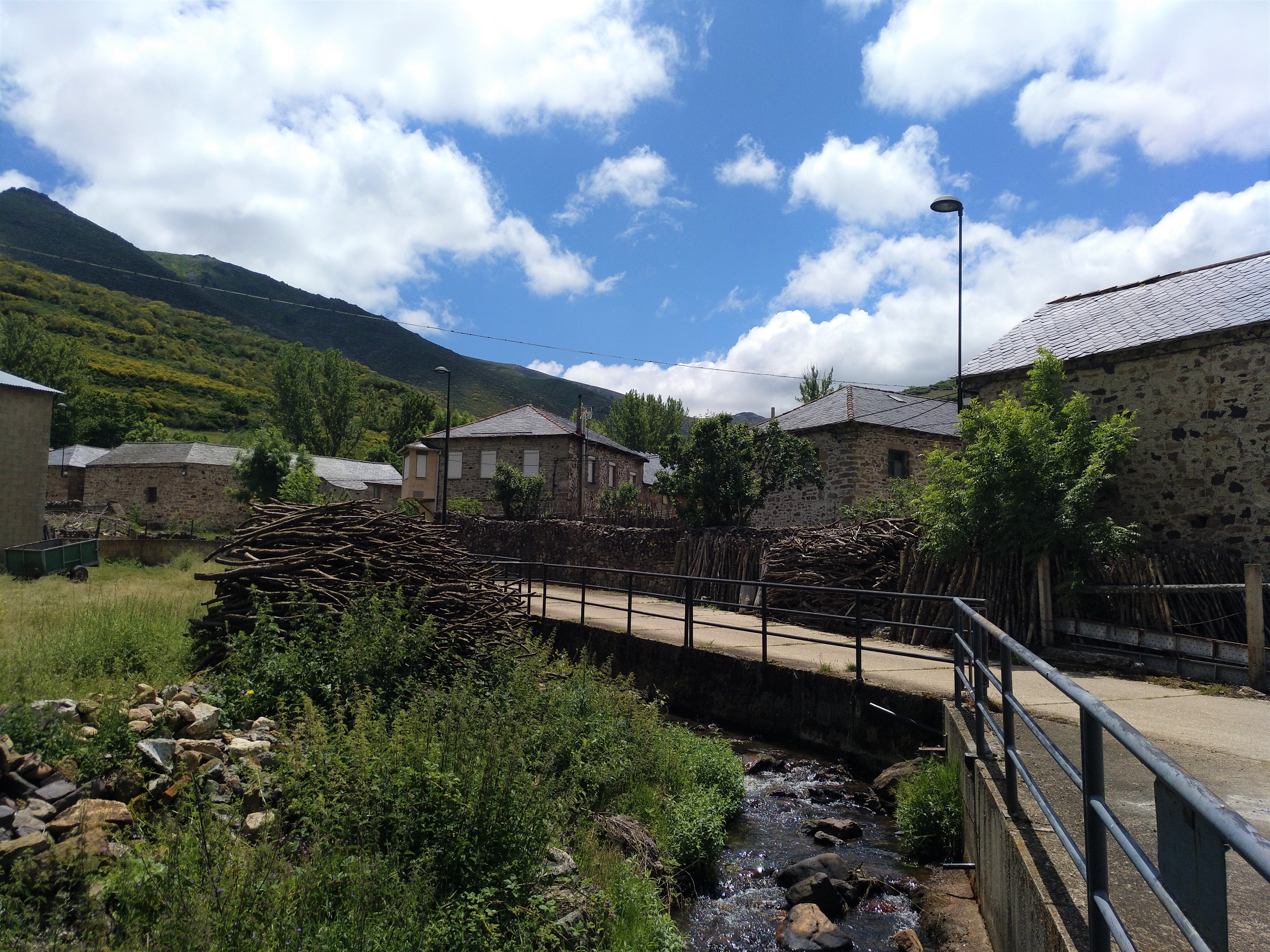

- Location within Province of León Location within Castile and León Location within Spain
- Coordinates: 42°56′3″N 6°8′54″W
- Country: Spain
- Autonomous community: Castile and León
- Province: Province of León
- Municipality: Cabrillanes
- Elevation: 1,310 m (4,300 ft)

Population
  - Total: 50

Peñalba de los Cilleros (Astur-Leonese: Penalba) is a locality located in the municipality of Cabrillanes, in the province of León, Castile and León, Spain. As of 2020, it has a population of 50.

== Geography ==
Peñalba de los Cilleros is located 88km northwest of León, Spain.
