= Vega de Viejos =

- Locality
- La Vega de los Viejos
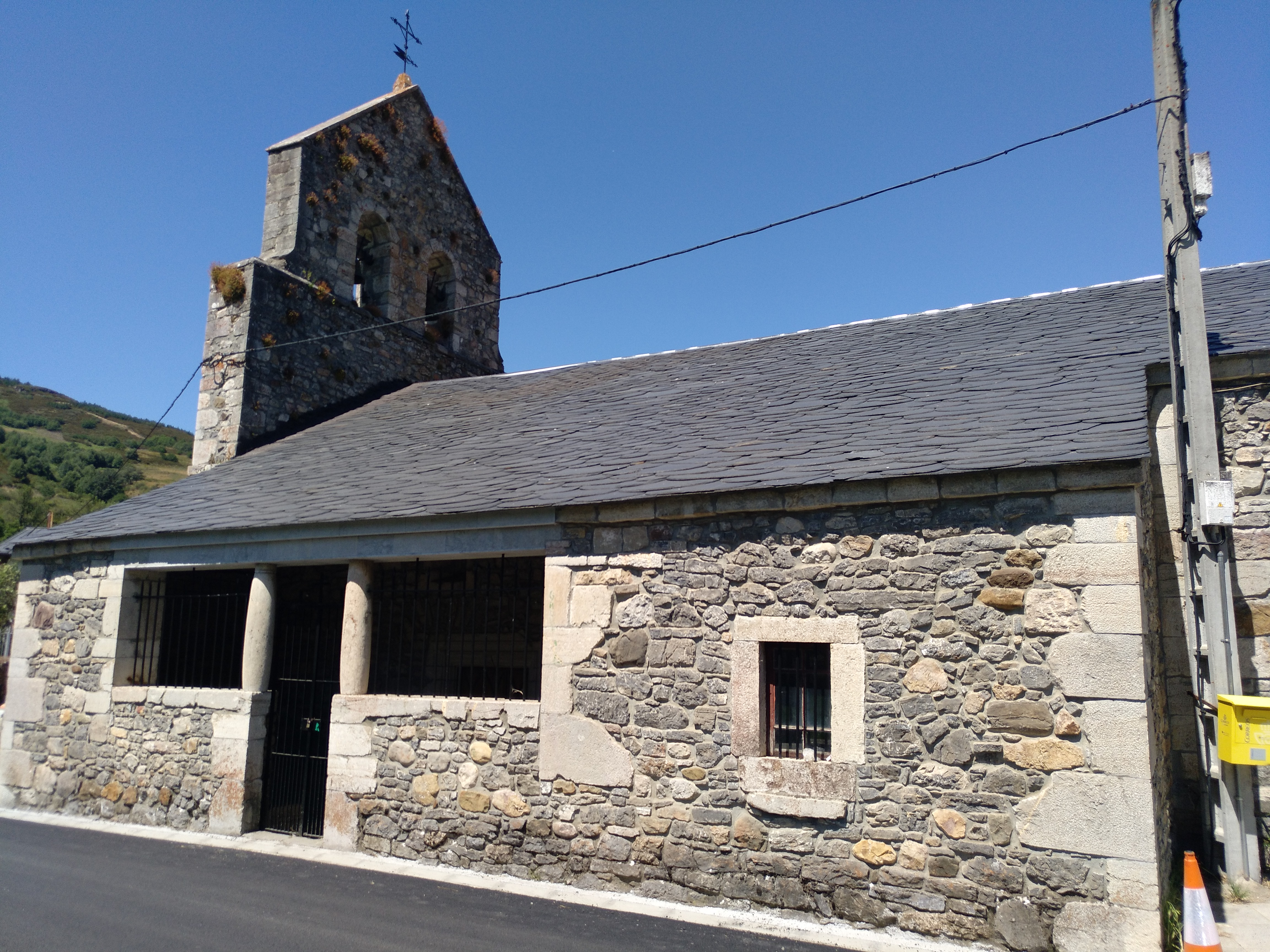

- Location within Province of León Location within Castile and León Location within Spain
- Coordinates: 42°58′7″N 6°12′52″W
- Country: Spain
- Autonomous community: Castile and León
- Province: Province of León
- Municipality: Cabrillanes
- Elevation: 1,238 m (4,062 ft)

Population
  - Total: 42

Vega de Viejos or La Vega de los Viejos (Leonese: La Veiga de Vieḷḷus) is a locality located in the municipality of Cabrillanes, in the province of León, Castile and León, Spain. As of 2020, it has a population of 42.

== Geography ==
Vega de Viejos is located 92km northwest of León, Spain.
