= Meroy =

- Locality
- Location within Province of León Location within Castile and León Location within Spain
- Coordinates: 42°58′35″N 6°13′6″W
- Country: Spain
- Autonomous community: Castile and León
- Province: Province of León
- Municipality: Cabrillanes
- Elevation: 1,283 m (4,209 ft)

Population
  - Total: 20

Meroy (Astur-Leonese: Meirói) is a locality located in the municipality of Cabrillanes, in the province of León, Castile and León, Spain. As of 2020, it has a population of 20.

== Geography ==
Meroy is located 93km northwest of León, Spain.
