= Piedrafita de Babia =

- Locality
- Location within Province of León Location within Castile and León Location within Spain
- Coordinates: 42°57′6″N 6°11′35″W
- Country: Spain
- Autonomous community: Castile and León
- Province: Province of León
- Municipality: Cabrillanes
- Elevation: 1,267 m (4,157 ft)

Population
  - Total: 164

Piedrafita de Babia (Astur-Leonese: Piedrafita) is a locality located in the municipality of Cabrillanes, in the province of León, Castile and León, Spain. As of 2020, it has a population of 164.

== Geography ==
Piedrafita de Babia is located 89km northwest of León, Spain.
