= La Cueta =

- Locality
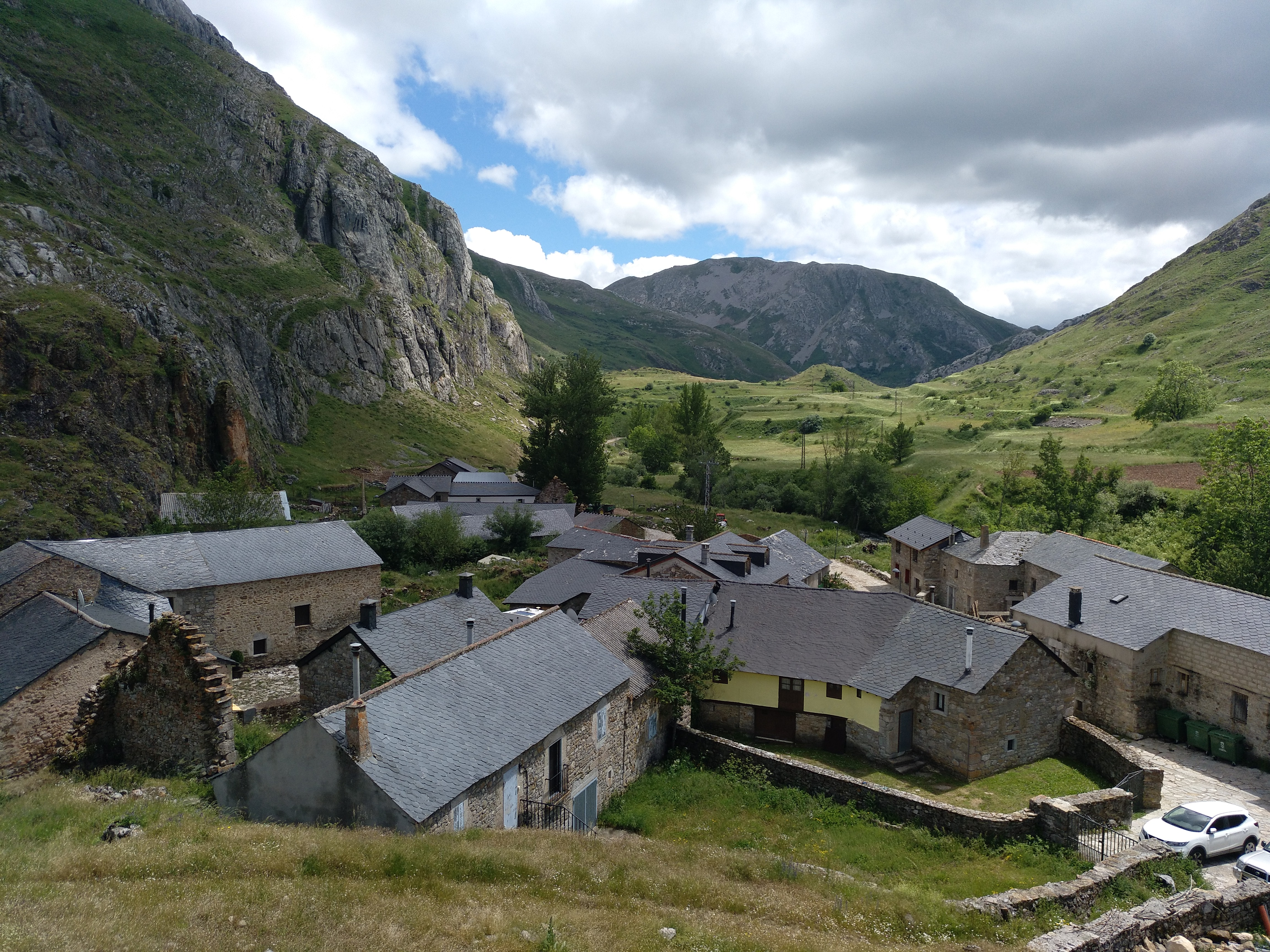

- Location within Province of León Location within Castile and León Location within Spain
- Coordinates: 43°0′50″N 6°11′14″W
- Country: Spain
- Autonomous community: Castile and León
- Province: Province of León
- Municipality: Cabrillanes
- Elevation: 1,447 m (4,747 ft)

Population
  - Total: 57

La Cueta is a locality located in the municipality of Cabrillanes, in the province of León province, Castile and León, Spain. As of 2020, it has a population of 57.

== Geography ==
La Cueta is located 98km northwest of León, Spain.
