= Cabrillanes =

Cabrillanes (municipality) Vabia d'Arriba, (town) Cabrichanes (Asturian)
- municipality
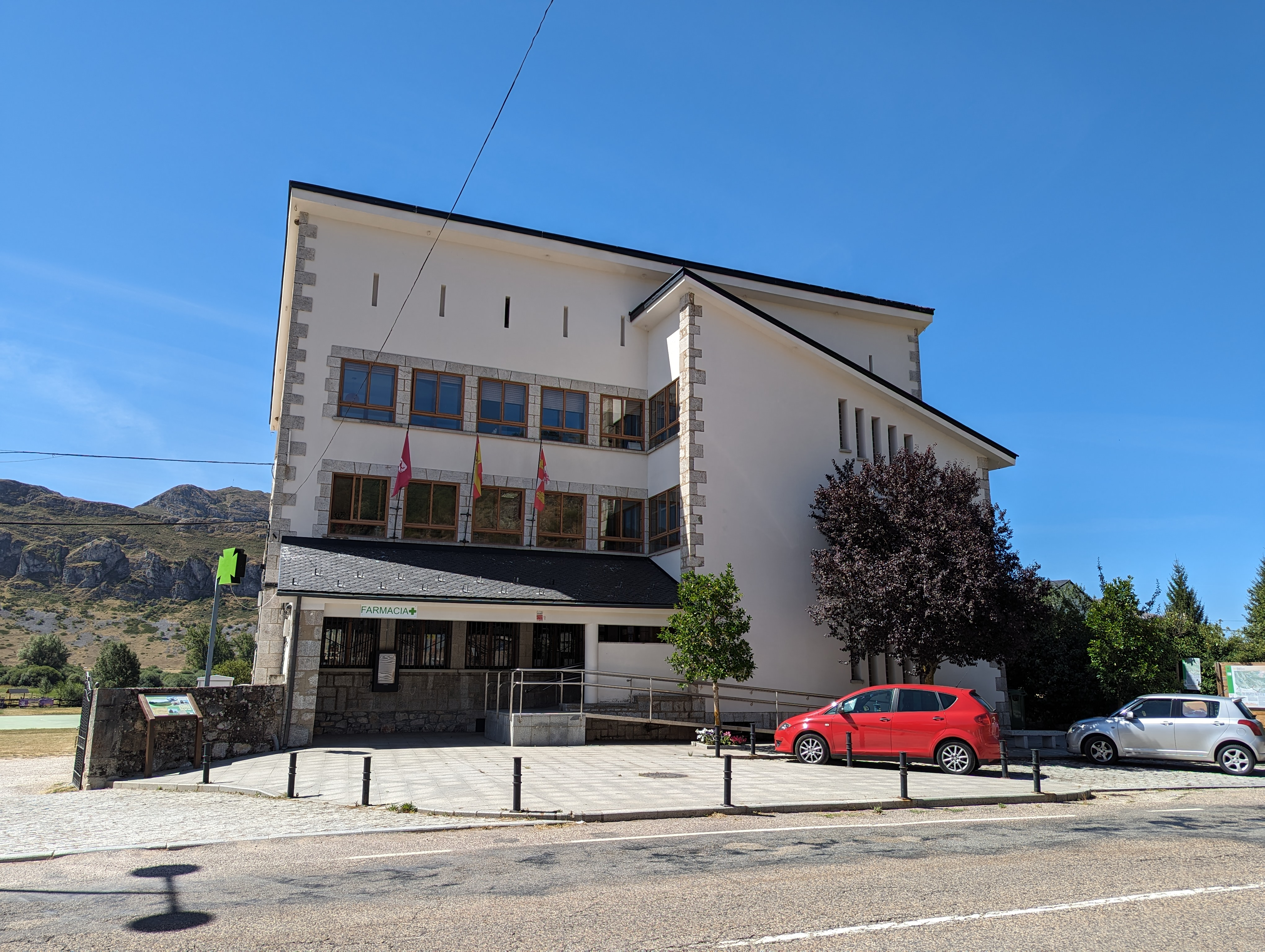
- Town hall

- Coat of arms

- Location within Spain
- Coordinates: 42°57′10″N 6°8′55″W
- Country: Spain
- Autonomous community: Castile and León
- Province: León
- Municipality: Cabrillanes

Government
  - Mayor: Lina Freire Suárez (PSOE)

Area
  - Total: 169.16 km^{2} (65.31 sq mi)
- Elevation: 1,249 m (4,098 ft)

Population (2025-01-01)
  - Total: 687
  - Density: 4.06/km^{2} (10.5/sq mi)
- Time zone: UTC+1 (CET)
  - Summer (DST): UTC+2 (CEST)
- Postal Code: 24142
- Telephone prefix: 987
- Website: Ayto. de Cabrillanes

Cabrillanes (Astur-Leonese: Vabia d'Arriba) is a municipality located in the province of León, Castile and León, Spain.

== Population ==
According to the 2010 census (INE), Cabrillanes' municipality has a population of 964 inhabitants.

== Villages ==
Cabrillanes' municipality has fourteen villages (Astur-Leonese / Spanish):

- Cabrichanes / Cabrillanes (Asturian pronunciation: [kaβɾiˈtʃanes; -nɪs] / Spanish pronunciation: [kaβɾiˈʎanes])
- La Cueta
- Güergas / Huergas de Babia
- Ḷḷau / Lago de Babia
- Meirói / Meroy
- Mena / Mena de Babia
- Las Murias / Las Murias de Babia
- Penalba / Peñalba de Cilleros
- Piedrafita / Piedrafita de Babia
- Quintanieḷḷa / Quintanilla de Babia
- La Riera / Riera de Babia
- San Feles / San Félix de Arce
- Torre / Torre de Babia
- Veiga Viechos / Vega de Viejos
