= Ponferrada =

- Municipality
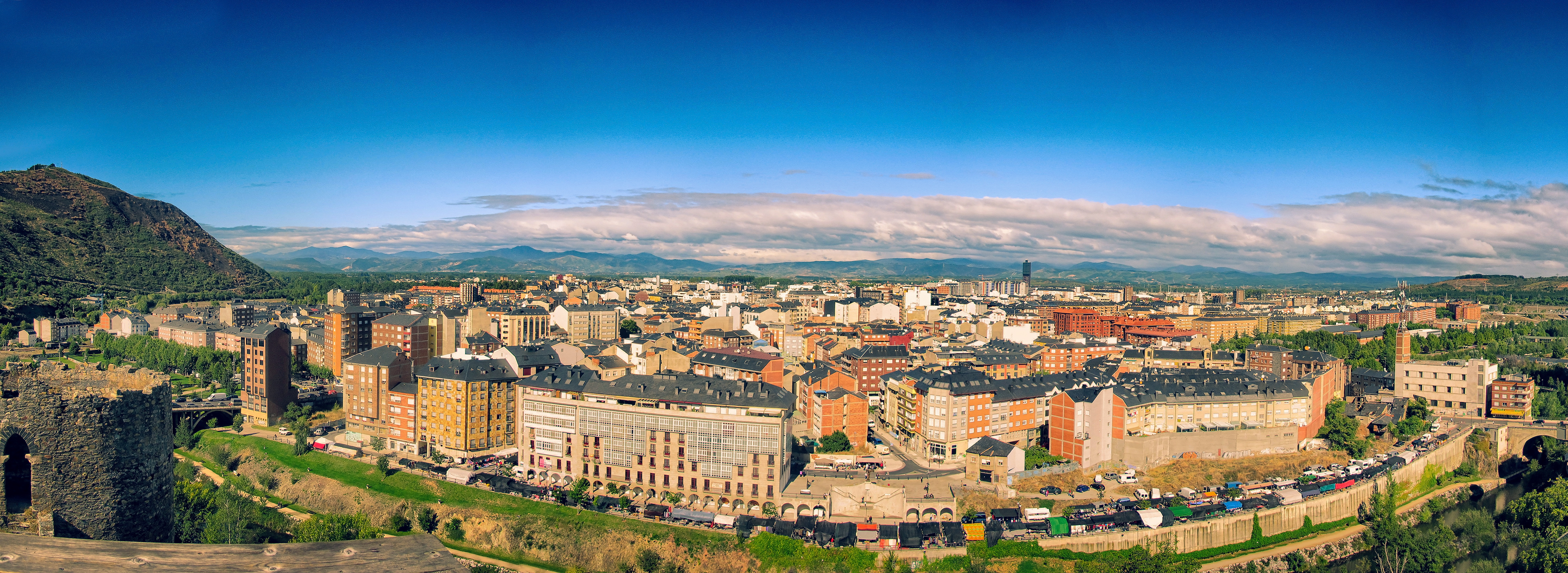

- Coat of arms
- Interactive map of Ponferrada
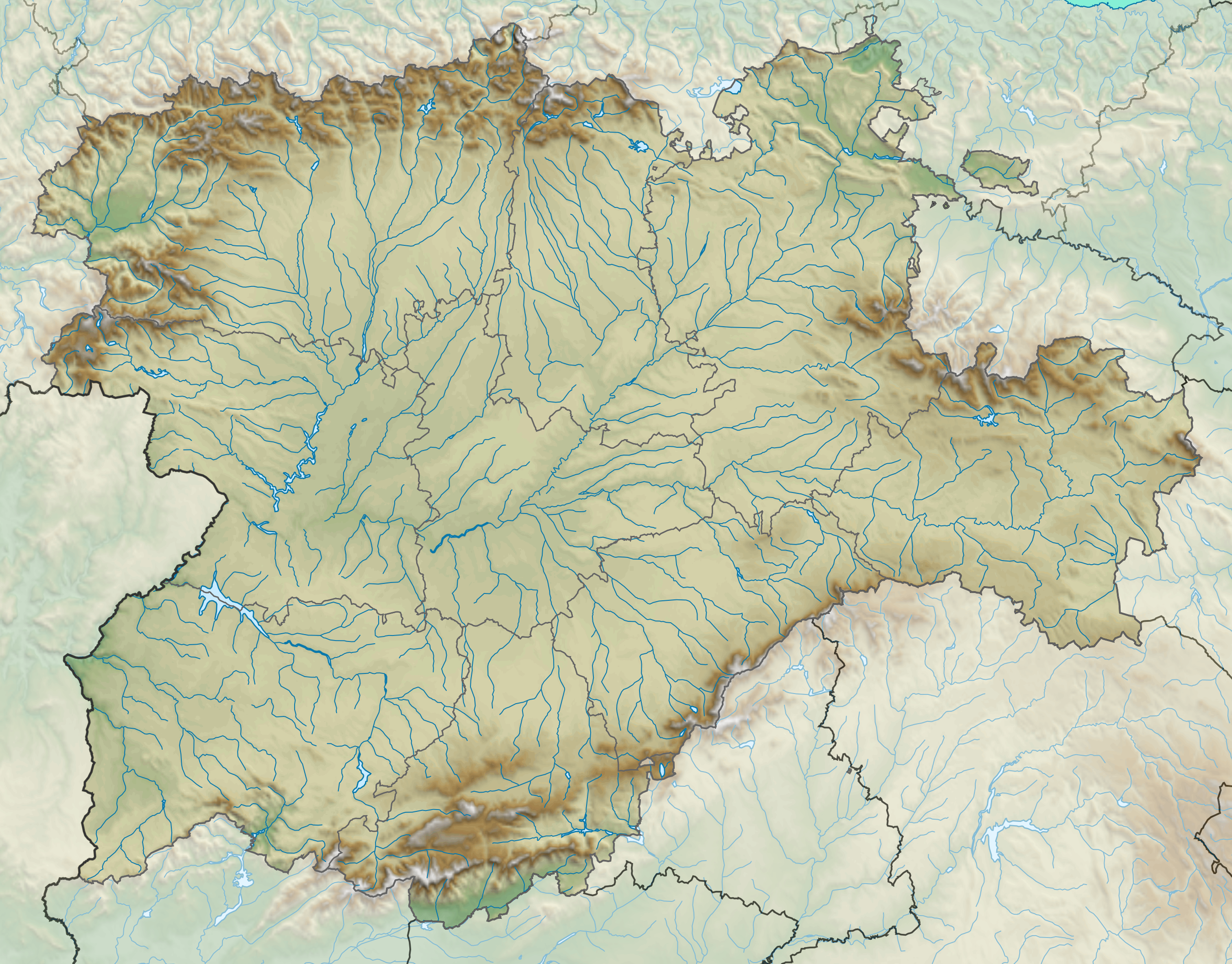
- Location in Castile and León Location in Spain
- Coordinates: 42°33′N 6°35′W
- Country: Spain
- Autonomous community: Castile and León
- Province: León
- Comarca: El Bierzo

Government
  - Mayor: Marco Antonio Morala (PP)

Area
  - Total: 283.17 km^{2} (109.33 sq mi)
- Elevation: 544 m (1,785 ft)

Population (2025-01-01)
  - Total: 63,186
  - Density: 223.14/km^{2} (577.92/sq mi)
- Time zone: UTC+1 (CET)
  - Summer (DST): UTC+2 (CEST)
- Postal code: 244xx
- Website: www.ponferrada.org

Ponferrada (Spanish pronunciation: [poɱfeˈraða]) is a city of Spain, located in the autonomous community of Castile and León. Ponferrada, the second most populated municipality of the Province of León, is also the capital city of El Bierzo, the only comarca recognized as an administrative entity by law in the region.

Surrounded by mountains, the city straddles the course of the Sil River. It is the last major town on the French route of the Camino de Santiago before it reaches Santiago de Compostela. In 2021, it had a population of 63,747.

== Etymology ==
Ponferrada comes from the Latin Pons Ferrata, which it translates to Iron Bridge.

== History ==
The place traces its origin back to 928 gifting to the Monastery of San Pedro de Montes of a villa between the Sil and the Boeza by Lupo and his wife, which possessed ferrum (iron) and was located at the feet of an abandoned castrum.

The name of the city derives from the iron reinforcements added to the ancient bridge over the river Sil (Latin pons for "bridge" and ferrata for "iron"), commissioned in 1082 by Bishop Osmundo of Astorga to facilitate the crossing of the Sil to pilgrims in their way to Santiago de Compostela.

From 1211 to 1312, Ponferrada was a holding of the Order of the Temple.

The railroad arrived in Ponferrada in 1881, and during World War I local tungsten deposits were exploited to supply the arms industry. In 1918, the Ponferrada Mining, Iron and Steel Company (Spanish: Minero Siderúrgica de Ponferrada (MSP)) was founded to exploit coal deposits in the region, and it grew to become Spain's largest coal mining corporation. The Spanish National Energy Corporation (Endesa) was founded in 1944, and in 1949, it opened Spain's first coal-fueled power plant in Ponferrada, Compostilla I. In 1960, the Bárcena Dam (Spanish: Pantano de Bárcena) opened and by the second half of the 20th century the economy of the city was mainly based on mining and electricity generation, both hydroelectric and coal-fueled.

Starting in the late 1980s, most mines were closed, and after the collapse of the mining industry Ponferrada was in a crisis for a while. However, in the late 1990s, the city underwent a major transformation with the establishment of several industrial and service firms, the reintroduction of commercial wine production, the opening of a local branch of the University of León offering several undergraduate degrees, and in general, an improvement of the town's infrastructure. The economy is now based mainly on tourism, agriculture (fruit and wine), wind power generation and slate mining, with a constant small population increase.

Important factors contributing to the recent boom of the tourism industry are the increasing popularity of the Way of St. James (Spanish: Camino de Santiago; a pilgrimage route that goes from France to Santiago de Compostela, Galicia), the designation in 1997 of Las Médulas as a UNESCO World Heritage Site and the development of rural tourism lodging and wineries in the area. The Energy City Foundation Spanish: Fundación Ciudad de la Energía was established in Ponferrada in 2006 and is currently overseeing the construction of the National Energy Museum (Spanish: Museo Nacional de la Energía) in the city, as well as sponsoring several other initiatives that should further boost tourism and the economy of the city and its region.

== Climate ==
The climate in Ponferrada is warm-summer Mediterranean (Csb) under the Köppen classification and subtropical with dry summer (Mediterranean) with warm summer and cool winter (Csbk) under the Trewartha classification. The winters are cool and wet, the summers are warm and dry.

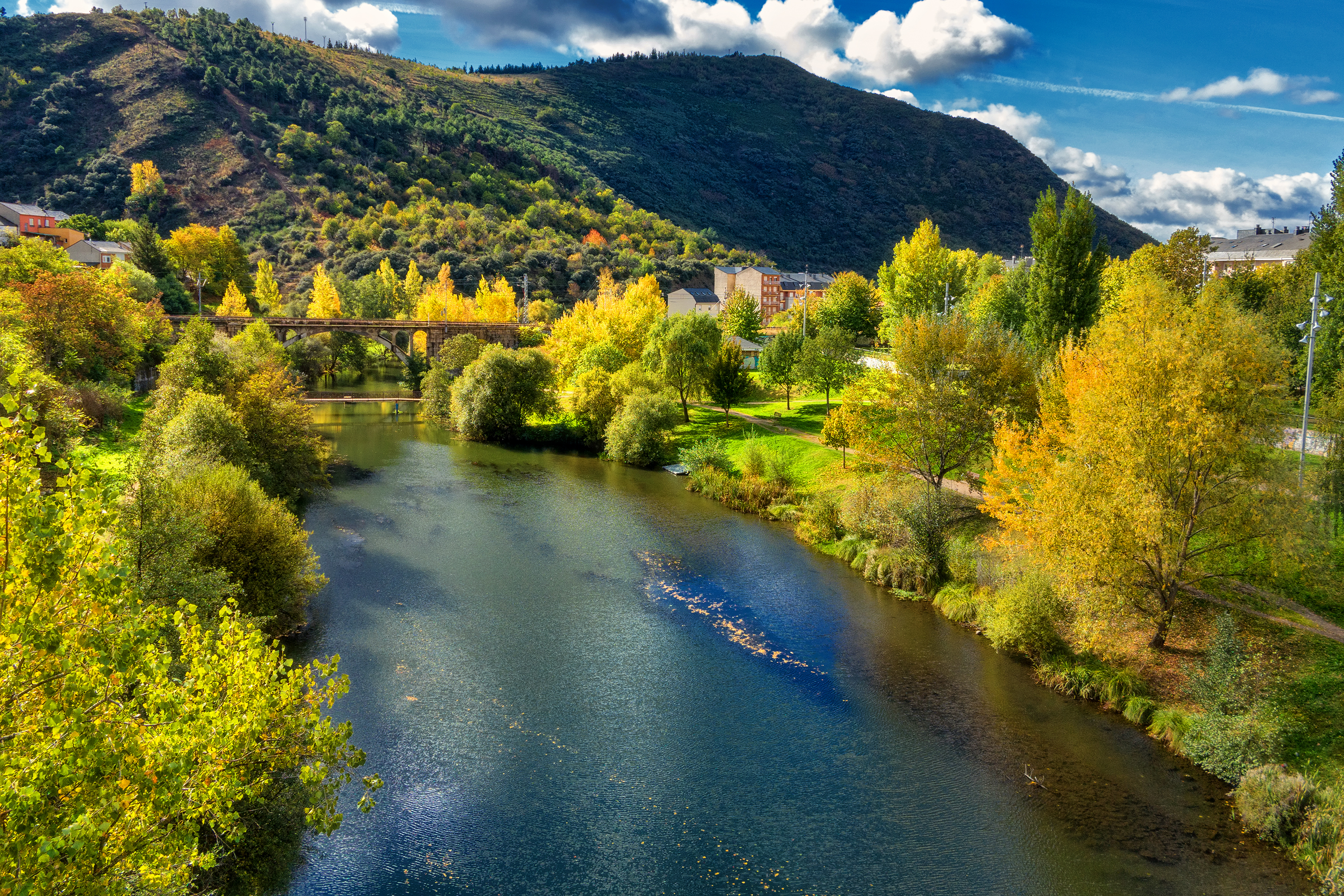
The Sil as it passes through Ponferrada

The average annual temperature in Ponferrada is 19 °C (66 °F) during the day and 7 °C (45 °F) at night. During the coldest month, January, the average temperature is 10 °C (50 °F) during the day and 1 °C (34 °F) at night. In the warmest month, July, the average temperature is 30 °C (86 °F) during the day and 14 °C (57 °F) at night.

During the winter, temperatures generally vary between 5 and 15 °C (41 and 59 °F) during the day and between −2 and 5 °C (28 and 41 °F) at night. Nights below freezing are very common during this period. Snowfall occurs almost every year with an average of 4-5 snow days every winter, although heavy snowfalls are uncommon in the city.

During the summer, temperatures generally vary between 25 and 32 °C (77 and 90 °F) during the day and between 12 and 17 °C (54 and 63 °F) at night. It is not uncommon that the temperature exceeds 35 °C (95 °F) during heatwaves. The sky is generally clear during this period with occasional storms.

Spring and autumn are mild to warm and wet. Temperatures generally vary between 14 and 25 °C (57 and 77 °F) during the day and between 4 and 10 °C (39 and 50 °F) at night.

The highest temperature ever recorded in Ponferrada was 41.5 °C (106.7 °F) on July 17, 2022, and the lowest −10.4 °C (13.3 °F) on January 4, 1971.

Climate data for Ponferrada (534m), (1991-2020)
Month	Jan	Feb	Mar	Apr	May	Jun	Jul	Aug	Sep	Oct	Nov	Dec	Year
Record high °C (°F)	19.8 (67.6)	25.4 (77.7)	28.8 (83.8)	31.6 (88.9)	34.9 (94.8)	39.2 (102.6)	41.5 (106.7)	41.0 (105.8)	38.7 (101.7)	32.9 (91.2)	24.0 (75.2)	21.4 (70.5)	41.5 (106.7)
Mean maximum °C (°F)	15.5 (59.9)	18.5 (65.3)	23.4 (74.1)	26.9 (80.4)	30.7 (87.3)	34.7 (94.5)	36.4 (97.5)	36.3 (97.3)	32.6 (90.7)	25.7 (78.3)	19.7 (67.5)	15.3 (59.5)	37.3 (99.1)
Mean daily maximum °C (°F)	9.5 (49.1)	12.5 (54.5)	16.5 (61.7)	18.5 (65.3)	22.3 (72.1)	26.7 (80.1)	29.7 (85.5)	29.5 (85.1)	25.5 (77.9)	19.4 (66.9)	13.0 (55.4)	9.3 (48.7)	19.4 (66.9)
Daily mean °C (°F)	5.4 (41.7)	7.1 (44.8)	10.2 (50.4)	12.3 (54.1)	15.7 (60.3)	19.6 (67.3)	22.0 (71.6)	21.7 (71.1)	18.5 (65.3)	13.9 (57.0)	8.7 (47.7)	5.6 (42.1)	13.4 (56.1)
Mean daily minimum °C (°F)	1.3 (34.3)	1.6 (34.9)	4.0 (39.2)	6.1 (43.0)	9.0 (48.2)	12.4 (54.3)	14.3 (57.7)	14.0 (57.2)	11.4 (52.5)	8.3 (46.9)	4.4 (39.9)	1.9 (35.4)	7.4 (45.3)
Mean minimum °C (°F)	−4.4 (24.1)	−3.4 (25.9)	−1.8 (28.8)	0.3 (32.5)	3.0 (37.4)	6.9 (44.4)	9.0 (48.2)	8.9 (48.0)	6.1 (43.0)	2.3 (36.1)	−1.7 (28.9)	−4.7 (23.5)	−5.9 (21.4)
Record low °C (°F)	−10.4 (13.3)	−8.6 (16.5)	−8.2 (17.2)	−2.4 (27.7)	−1.0 (30.2)	4.0 (39.2)	4.6 (40.3)	5.5 (41.9)	1.6 (34.9)	−1.5 (29.3)	−6.8 (19.8)	−9.6 (14.7)	−10.4 (13.3)
Average precipitation mm (inches)	74.6 (2.94)	51.4 (2.02)	51.6 (2.03)	49.3 (1.94)	50.2 (1.98)	32.6 (1.28)	21.5 (0.85)	21.3 (0.84)	42.5 (1.67)	77.8 (3.06)	82.1 (3.23)	83.9 (3.30)	638.8 (25.15)
Average precipitation days (≥ 1 mm)	9.5	7.4	8.6	8.9	8.6	4.8	3.2	3.3	5.4	9.9	10.3	9.9	89.6
Average snowy days	1.1	1.4	0.5	0.1	0	0	0	0	0	0	0.1	0.8	4.1
Average relative humidity (%)	82	73	65	63	61	58	55	55	62	73	81	85	68
Mean monthly sunshine hours	85	102	156	187	196	268	307	287	217	156	109	63	2,113
Source: Agencia Estatal de Meteorología

== Tourism ==
=== Main sights ===
Ponferrada lies in the Way of St. James, a UNESCO World Heritage Site, and every year many pilgrims pass through the city in their way to Santiago de Compostela. Las Médulas, ancient Roman gold mines also included in the UNESCO World Heritage Site List, are only a few kilometres away from the city.

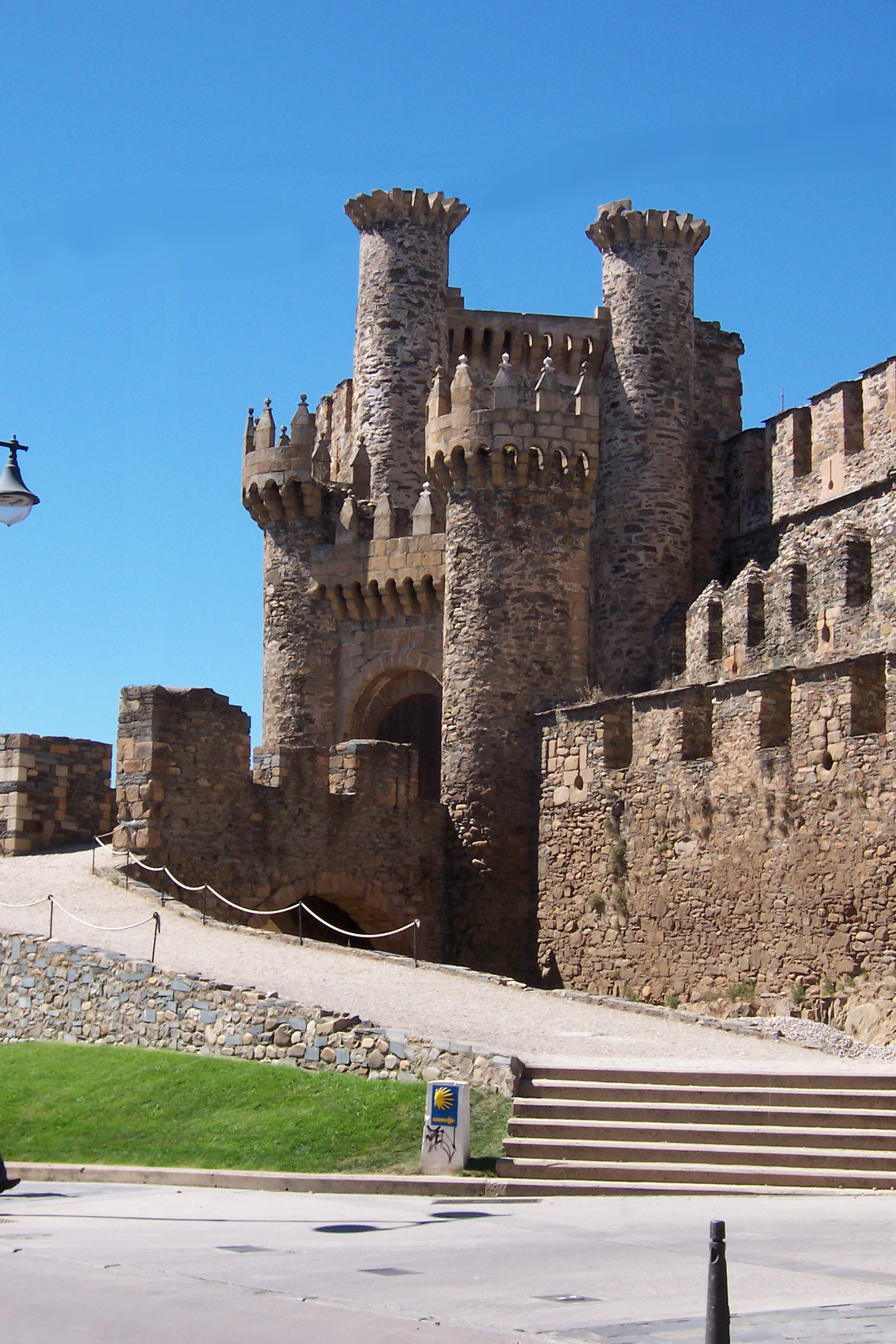
Facade of the Templar Castle, built in the 12th century.

Ponferrada is also noted for its Castillo de los Templarios, a Templar castle which covers approximately 16,000 square meters (170,000 square feet). In 1178, Ferdinand II of León donated the city to the Templar order for protecting the pilgrims on the Way of St. James who passed through El Bierzo in their road to Santiago de Compostela.

The castle hosted the Knights Templar's Grand Master of Castille. However, the Templars were only able to enjoy the use of their fortress for about twenty years before the order was disbanded and its properties confiscated in 1311. Several noble houses fought over the assets until Alfonso XI allotted them to the Count of Lemos in 1340. Finally, the Catholic Monarchs incorporated Ponferrada and its castle into the Crown in 1486. As with many other historical sites in Europe, many of the blocks that at one point formed the walls of the castle were removed and used in local construction projects.

The Basilica de la Encina is a church built in the Renaissance style in 1573. Its baroque tower dates from 1614.

The El Bierzo Museum (Spanish: Museo de El Bierzo) offers a tour of the history of the region and hosts several important archeological pieces, while the Museum of Radio (Spanish: Museo de la Radio) offers an interesting tour of the history of the radio in Spain. The National Energy Museum (Spanish: Museo Nacional de la Energía) is sponsored by the Energy City Foundation (Spanish: Fundación Ciudad de la Energía). It includes the restored building and equipment of Compostilla I, Spain's first coal-fueled power plant opened in 1949 in Ponferrada.

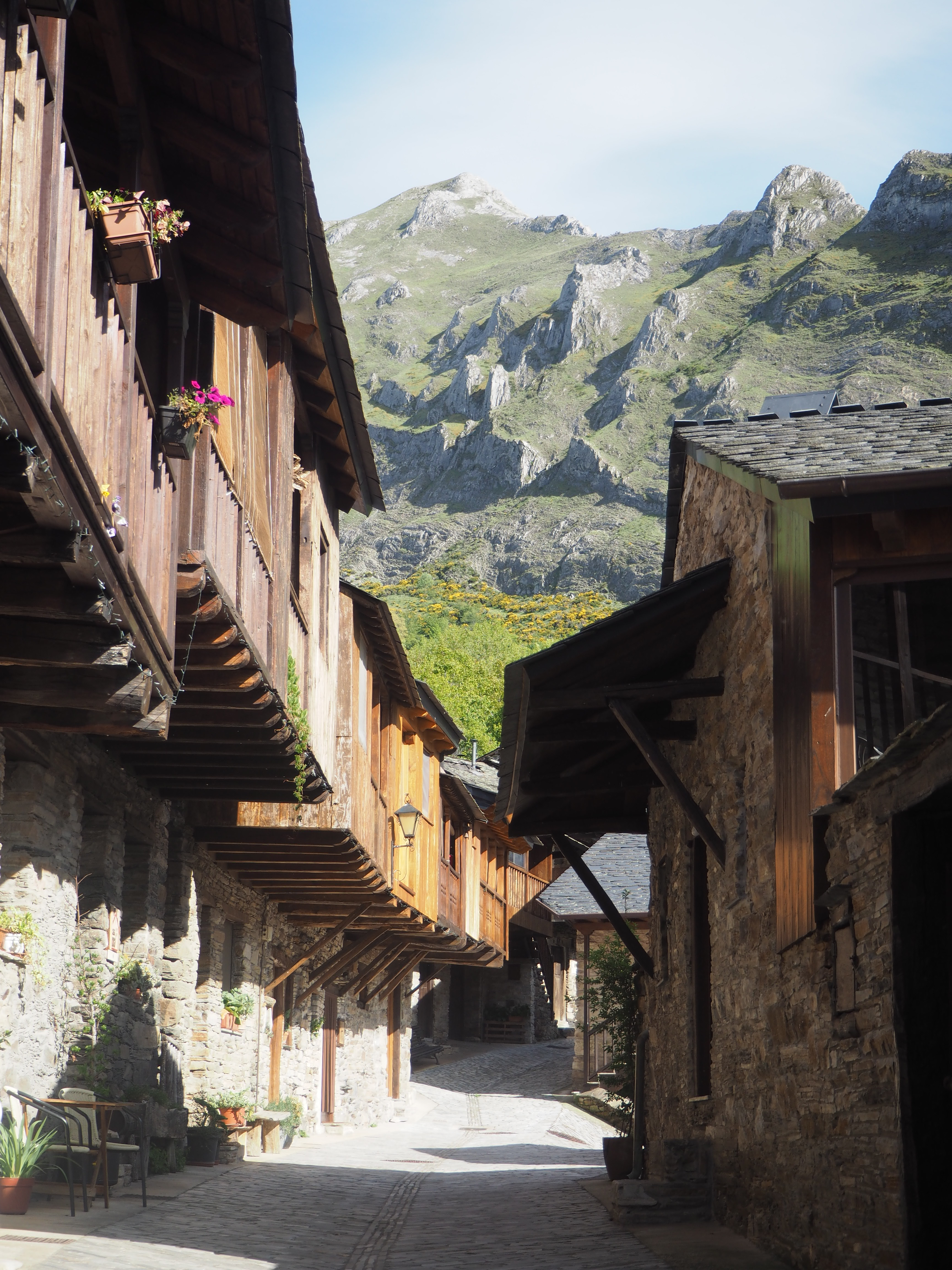
Vernacular architecture in Peñalba de Santiago, with the Montes Aquilanos as the backdrop.

The church of Santiago de Peñalba (an example of Mozarabic art), the Hermitage of Santo Tomás de las Ollas (10th century) and the Romanesque Church of Santa María de Vizbayo are also nearby.

The highest view from the city, is the Torre de la Rosaleda, in the Roseleda district, the tallest building in Ponferrada.

=== Outdoor activities ===
The city and its surroundings offer many opportunities for outdoor activities. There are many easily accessible hiking and cycling routes nearby, both on and off-road, including the 330 kilometer long La Mirada Circular which circles the whole El Bierzo valley. Cycling is also very popular, as the valley provides opportunities to exercise in both flat and inclined terrain, on and off-road.

El Morredero peak (2,135 m), 20 km from Ponferrada in the Aquilianos mountains, hosts a small ski resort.

It is possible to visit many wineries in the area to try the local wines and food, or simply visit the vineyards.

=== Events ===
Ponferrada hosts its annual festival (Fiestas de La Encina) during the first week of September with many concerts and activities for adults and especially children, and in July, it organises a Templar Night in its Templar Castle (participants dress up and recreate town life during the 14th century).

== Education ==
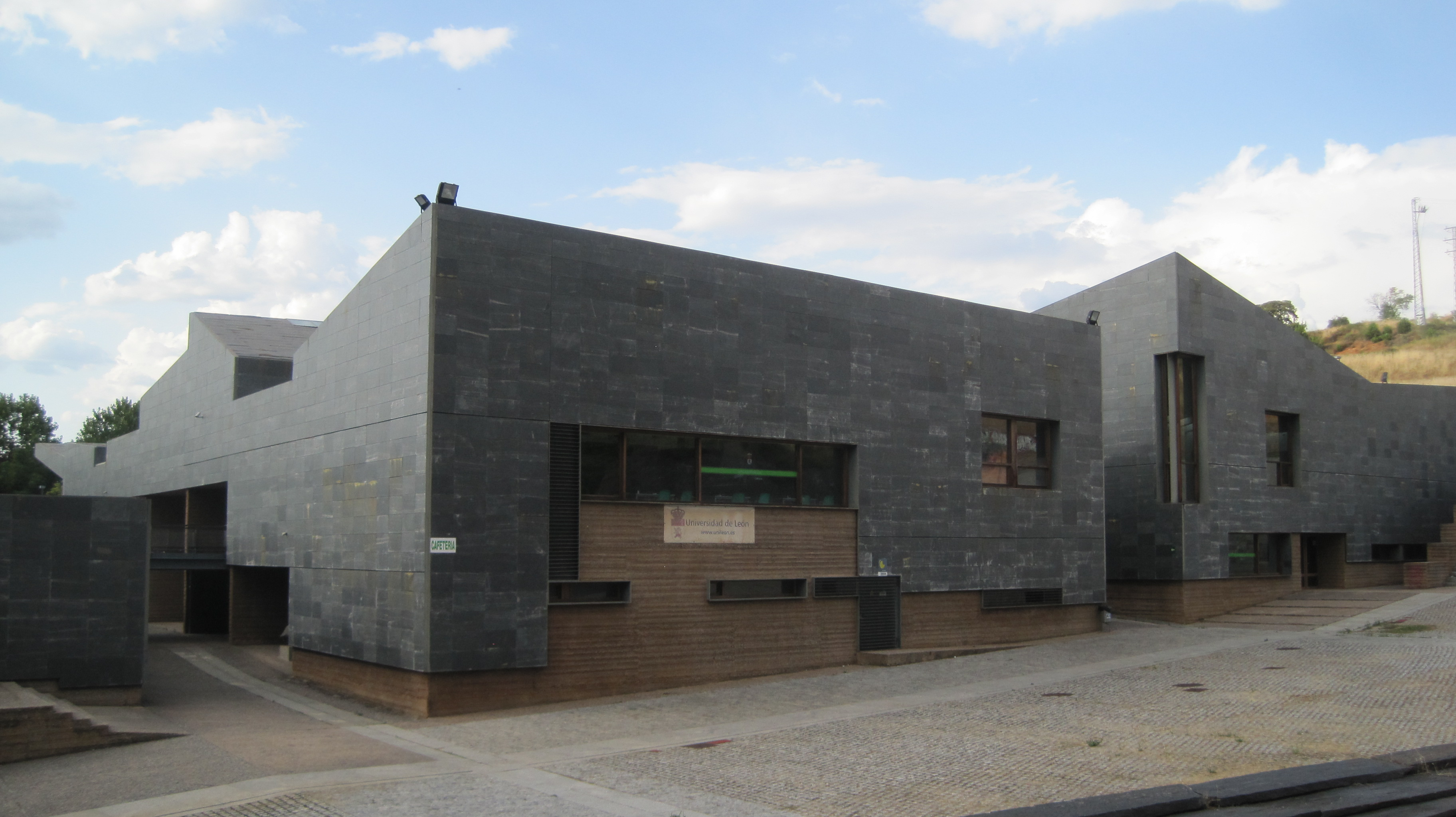
Library of the University of León's campus in Ponferrada.

Ponferrada has several primary and secondary education centers, as well as a public language school (Escuela Oficial de Idiomas) which offers English, French, German, Portuguese, Italian and Galician language courses. The city also hosts a University of León campus, which offers several undergraduate degrees, and a UNED branch, which provides distance undergraduate education.

== Culture ==
Theatre productions perform regularly at the local Teatro Bergidum, and there is a local multiplex cinema with seven screens. The city hosts a regional museum (El Bierzo Museum), a radio museum (Museum of Radio) and the National Energy Museum, in addition to music and cinema festivals each year.

== Sports ==
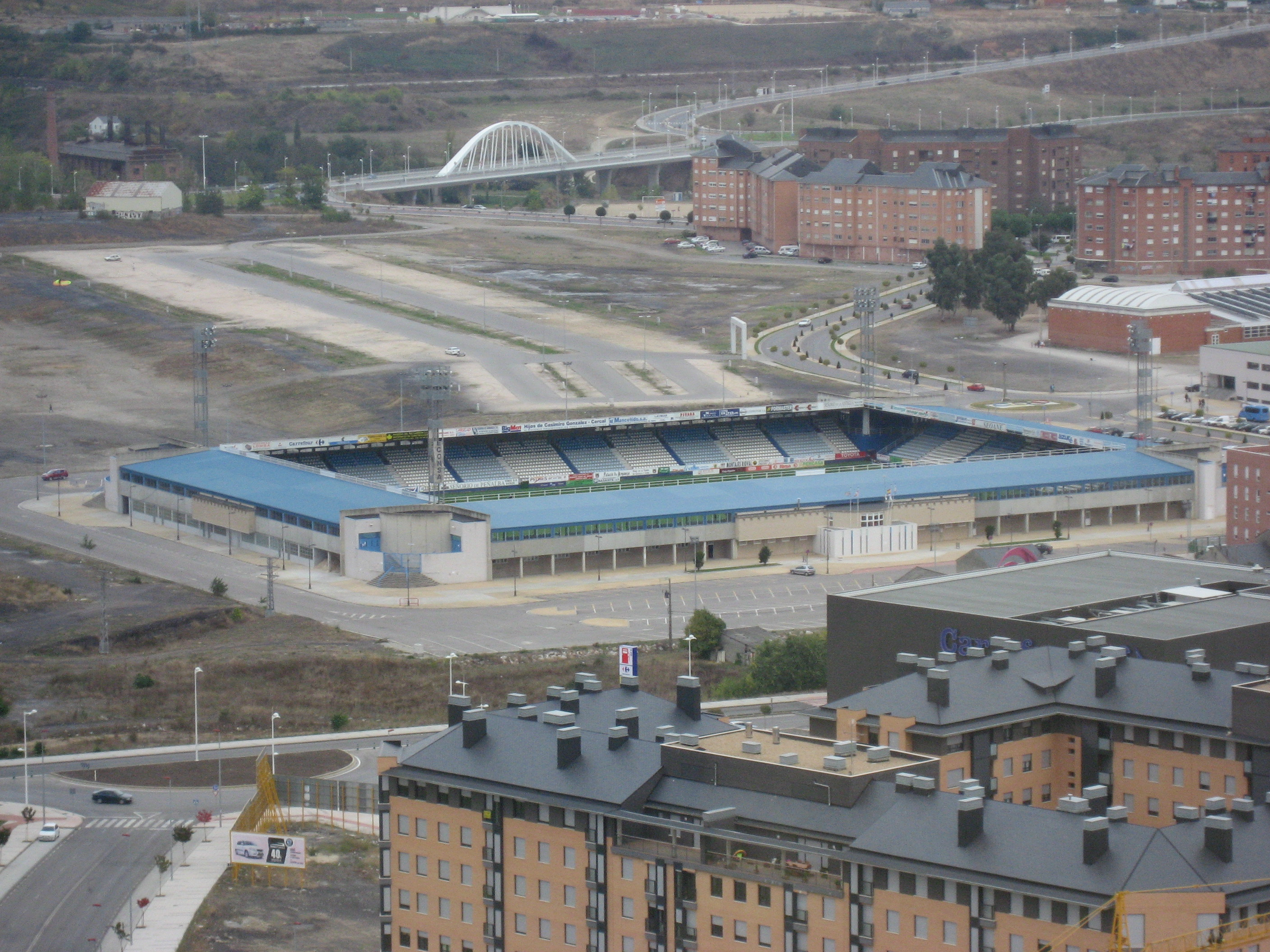
El Toralín, the home turf of SD Ponferradina.

The local football team, SD Ponferradina currently plays in the Spanish 2nd Division. The team had played for most of its history in the 2nd Division B of the Spanish Football League, however in the 2006–07 season the team was promoted for the first time to the 2nd Division, quite an achievement for a medium-sized city.

There are many intramural and regional leagues in football and other sports, including basketball, futsal, and athletics. The city's athletics stadium is named after former 800m world champion Colomán Trabado.

Ponferrada hosted the 2014 UCI Road World Championships from 21 to 28 September 2014. The city was appointed to organize it, on 21 September 2011.

== Transportation ==
Ponferrada is easily accessible by highway (Autovía A-6) and intercity public transportation is readily available, as several daily ALSA bus services. León Airport is the closest, while airports in Santiago, A Coruña, Asturias, Valladolid and Madrid Barajas provide alternative options for national and international air travel.

=== Rail ===
Ponferrada railway station provides rail services to the city, that are offered by RENFE. Passenger trains link the city with major population centers in Spain, including Madrid or Barcelona.

=== Buses ===
Ponferrada also has an urban bus network called SMT (Servicio Municipal de Transporte). It is made up of eight lines on the weekdays and six lines on the festive days that connect all the neighbourhoods with the city centre or Bierzo's Hospital. The bus fleet is composed of Mercedes-Benz Citaro and Isuzu buses and Mercedes-Benz minibuses.

=== Air ===
The city does not have its own airport. The nearest airports are León Airport, located 106 km (66 mi) east and Santiago–Rosalía de Castro Airport, located 197 km (122 mi) north west of Ponferrada.

== Notable people ==
- José María Calleja (1955–2020), journalist
- Valentín García Yebra (1917–2010), translator and member of the Royal Spanish Academy
- Lydia Valentín (born 1985), Olympic champion weightlifter

== See also ==
- 2014 UCI Road World Championships

== Bibliography ==
- Relea-Fernández, Carlos Emilio (2022). "Nuevas estéticas urbanas: el lavado de cara de Ponferrada". Ciudad y Territorio. Estudios Territoriales. 54 (214). Ministro de Vivienda y Agenda Urbana: 921–946. doi:10.37230/CyTET.2022.214.7. hdl:10612/26850. ISSN 1133-4762.
