= Montes Aquilanos =

Coordinates: 42°27′N 6°40′W

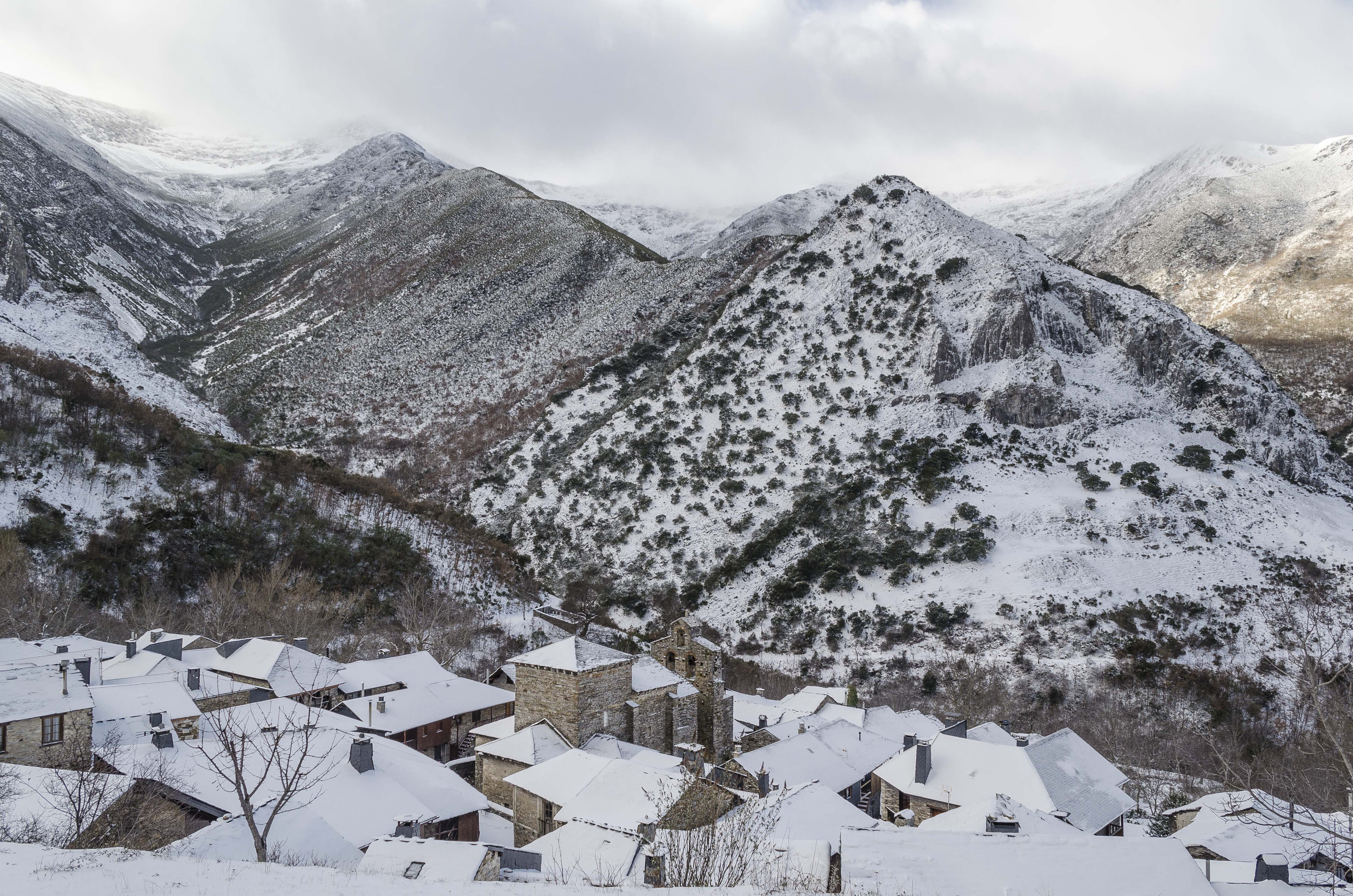
Winter in the Peñalba de Santiago, part of the Montes Aquilianos

Montes Aquilianos (Spanish for "Aquilian Mountains"), also known as Montes de El Bierzo and Alpes Bergidenses, is a mountain range within Montes de León, located to the south-southeast of the region of El Bierzo, pertaining to the Province of León in the autonomous region of Castile and León, Spain. It serves as border between the traditional counties of Valdueza, Bierzo Bajo, La Somoza and La Cabrera.

The official Ponferrada Tourism site El paraíso natural de los Montes Aquilianos highlights this terrain as the municipality’s largest forested area, offering diverse hiking routes, Roman-era water channels linked to Las Médulas mining, and traditional mountain chapel trails. It's a top destination for eco-tourism and outdoor enthusiasts in northwestern Spain.
