= Zenón de Somodevilla, 1st Marquess of Ensenada =

18th-century Spanish statesman

The Most Excellent Zenón de Somodevilla 1st Marquess of Ensenada
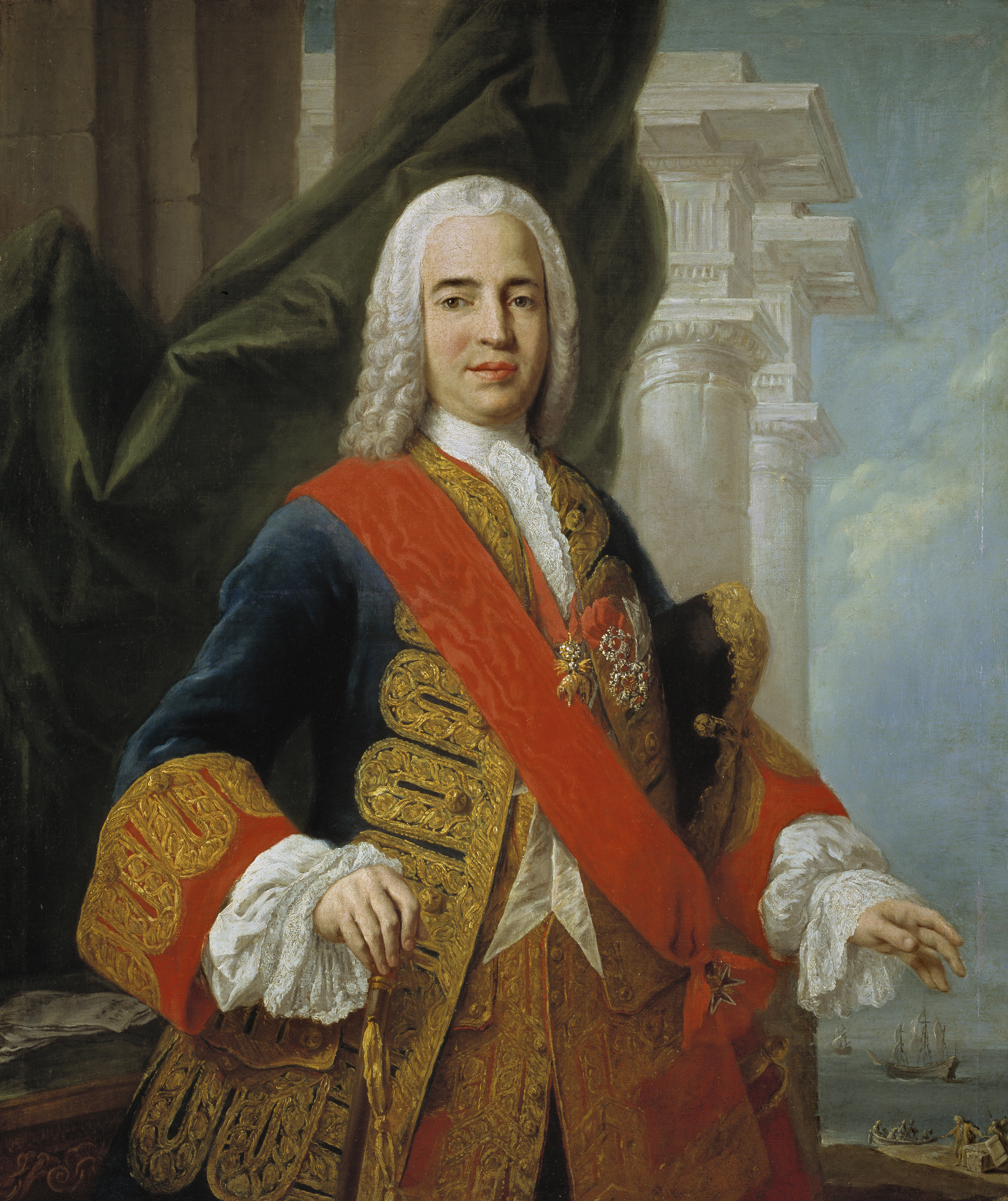
- Portrait at the Prado museum, ca. 1750

Secretary of State for Treasury of Spain
- In office 21 May 1743 – 22 July 1754
- Monarchs: Philip V Ferdinand VI
- First Secretary of State: Marquis of Villarías; José de Carvajal; Duke of Huéscar (as interim); Ricardo Wall
- Preceded by: José del Campillo
- Succeeded by: Count of Valdeparaíso

Secretary of State for War of Spain
- In office 11 April 1743 – 22 July 1754
- Monarchs: Philip V Ferdinand VI
- First Secretary of State: Marquis of Villarías; José de Carvajal; Duke of Huéscar (as interim); Ricardo Wall
- Preceded by: Marquis of Villarías (acting)
- Succeeded by: Sebastián de Eslava

Secretary of State for Navy and Indies of Spain
- In office 11 April 1743 – 22 July 1754
- Monarchs: Philip V Ferdinand VI
- First Secretary of State: Marquis of Villarías; José de Carvajal; Duke of Huéscar (as interim); Ricardo Wall
- Preceded by: Marquis of Villarías
- Succeeded by: Julián de Arriaga y Ribera

Admiral of the Fleet of Spain
- First Secretary of State: José de Carvajal y Lancáster

Personal details
- Born: Zenón de Somodevilla y Bengoechea; 20 April 1702 Hervías, Spain
- Died: 2 December 1781 (aged 79) Medina del Campo, Spain
- Profession: Statesman

Zenón de Somodevilla y Bengoechea, 1st Marquess of Ensenada (April 20, 1702 – December 2, 1781), commonly known as the Marquess of Ensenada, was a Spanish statesman. He played a key role in crafting and enforcing the Great Gypsy Round-up, officially known as the General Imprisonment of the Gypsies, which was an attempt to exterminate the Roma living in Spain, leading to the death of 12,000 Romani People.

== Biography ==
Little is known of Somodevilla's parents, Francisco de Somodevilla and his wife, Francisca de Bengoechea, nor is anything known of his own life prior to entering the civil administration of the Spanish navy as a clerk in 1720. He was born in Alesanco near Logroño. He served in administrative capacities in Ceuta in that year and in the reoccupation of Oran in 1731. His ability was recognized by Don José Patiño, the chief minister of King Philip V, who promoted him to supervise work at the naval arsenal at Ferrol, the main base of the Spanish Navy's Maritime Department of the North since the time of the early Bourbons.

Somodevilla was also involved in the endeavors by the Spanish government to elevate the king's sons by his marriage to Elizabeth Farnese, Charles and Philip, on the thrones of Naples and Parma respectively. In 1736 Charles, afterwards King Charles III of Spain, conferred on Somodevilla the Neapolitan title of Marqués de la Ensenada. While an ensenada is a roadstead or a small bay, some of the ancestry-conscious upper-classes and nobility of the court, envious of the rise of this upstart self-made man delighted in the pun, that the name from the title can be phonetically divided into three Spanish words "en si nada," which means "in himself nothing." Ensenada was one of the new type of royal advisor, the man of no social standing.

In 1742 Ensenada became Secretary of State and War to Philip, duke of Parma. The following year, on April 11, 1743, after Patinos's successor Campillo died suddenly, as Marquess of Ensenada, he was chosen by Philip V as Minister of Finance, War, the Navy and the Indies (i.e. the ultramarine portion of the Spanish Empire). Ensenada met the nomination with a nolo episcopari, professing that he was incapable of filling the four posts at once. His reluctance was dismissed by the king, and he became prime minister at the age of forty-one. During the remainder of the king's reign, which lasted till July 11, 1746, and under his successor Ferdinand VI until 1754, Ensenada was the prime minister, leading the country to victory alongside France and Prussia in the War of the Austrian Succession.

His administration is notable in Spanish history for the vigor of his policy of internal reform. He drew up reports on the finances and general condition of the country for the new king on his accession, and again after peace was made with Great Britain at Aix-la-Chapelle on October 18, 1748. Under his direction the rule of the Bourbon kings became more centralized, public works were undertaken, shipping was encouraged, trade was fostered and numbers of young Spaniards were sent abroad for education. Ensenada was a regalist, who sought to increase the power of the crown and bring the Catholic Church more under its control. He initiated reforms that "were intended to redefine the clergy as a professional class of spiritual specialists with fewer judicial and administrative responsibilities and less independence than in Hapsburg times." From 1749 onwards Ensenada encouraged one of the most important census and statistical investigations in the Europe of his time, known as Catastro of Ensenada, as a first step of a broader reform on taxes. Ensenada joined with Jorge Juan and Antonio de Ulloa in harsh criticism of the functioning of the Spanish Empire in Spanish America, targeting corruption and inefficiency. Juan and Ulloa's secret report was a devastating indictment of the American-born Spanish elites (criollos) and the incompetence of colonial rule. This report was to influence crown policy in what became known as the Bourbon Reforms.

Ensenada was a strong supporter of an alliance with France in opposition to Britain. British ambassador Sir Benjamin Keene supported the Spanish court in opposing Ensenada, and succeeded in preventing him from adding the foreign office to the others which he held. Ensenada would probably have fallen sooner but for the support he received from the Portuguese queen, Barbara. In 1754 he offended her by opposing an exchange of Spanish and Portuguese colonial possessions in America which she favored. Following a scandal at court resulting from a conspiracy between José de Carvajal y Lancáster and Keene, Ensenada was arrested by the king's order on July 20, 1754, and was sacked as prime minister upon Carvajal's death (see Enlightenment Spain). He was sent into mild confinement at Granada; he was afterwards allowed to relocate to Puerto de Santa Maria.

On the accession of Charles III in 1759, he was released and allowed to return to Madrid. The new king named him as member of a commission appointed to reform the taxation system. Ensenada soon offended the king. On April 18, 1766, he was again exiled from court, and ordered to go to Medina del Campo. He remained there until his death on 2 December 1781 and was never again involved in public life.

== See also ==
- History of Spain (1700-1810)
- Regalism
