= Cares Trail =

Trekking path in Picos de Europa, Spain

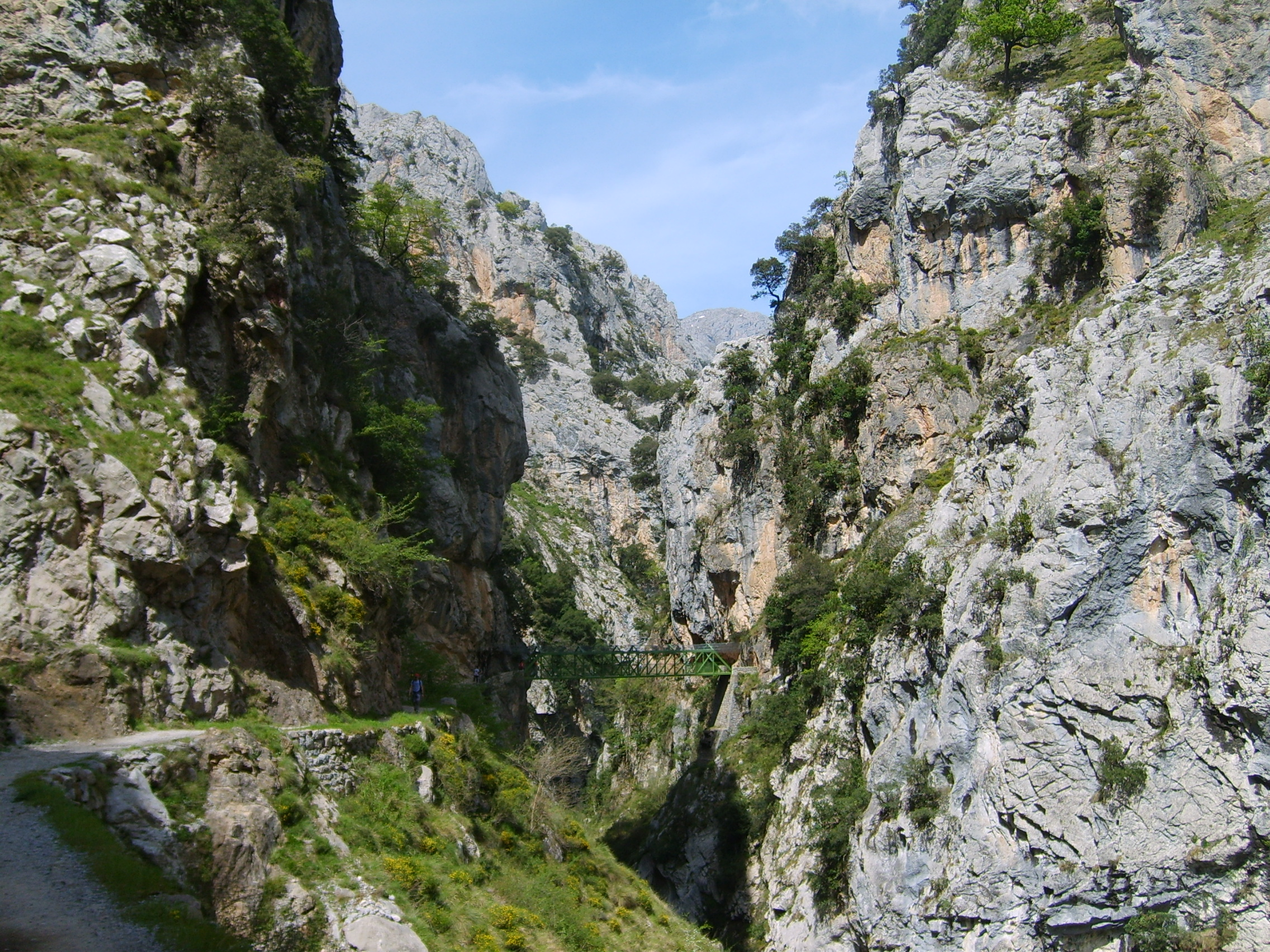
- Length: 11 kilometres (6.8 mi)

Geography
- Location: León and Asturias in Spain
- Coordinates: 43°14′22″N 4°53′25″W
- Rivers: Cares River
- Interactive map of Cares Trail

The Cares Trail or Ruta del Cares is one of the most popular trekking paths within the Picos de Europa. The route is situated between the province of León and Asturias, in Spain. It runs from the Asturian village of Puente Poncebos to Posada de Valdeón through Caín in Leon along the Cares Canyon. In the old times, the route was the only way to reach both towns during the snow seasons in the winter.

== History ==
The Cares Trail was first opened in the mountain rock along the Cares river's canyon between the years of 1916 and 1921 to provide maintenance, food and supplies to the hydroelectric powerplant of Camarmeña - Poncebos; It was later improved and expanded between 1945 and 1950.

== Characteristics ==
The Cares Trail runs in between the Cantabrian Mountains and is referred to as the "Divine Gorge" of the Cares river, It is a pathway at mid-height of approximately 11 kilometers in length. It is considered one of the most beautiful natural sites in Spain, it runs along caves, bridges and pathways sculpted in the rock.

While the Cares river carves a much longer path across the mountains to flow into the bay of Biscay in the Atlantic Ocean. From south to north it runs through, Valdeón (province of León), Cabrales, Peñamellera Alta and Peñamellera Baja. The path known in Spanish as the "Ruta del Cares", is an accessible part, through an elevated trail over the river.

The rocks that form the mountains on both sides of the Defile are made out of grey Limestone. In them there are numerous hollows and caves, some of which have been used as shelter for sheep that pasture in the nearby fields.

When the route reaches Caín, the Defile opens, and the path continues through a bridge that runs through the town.

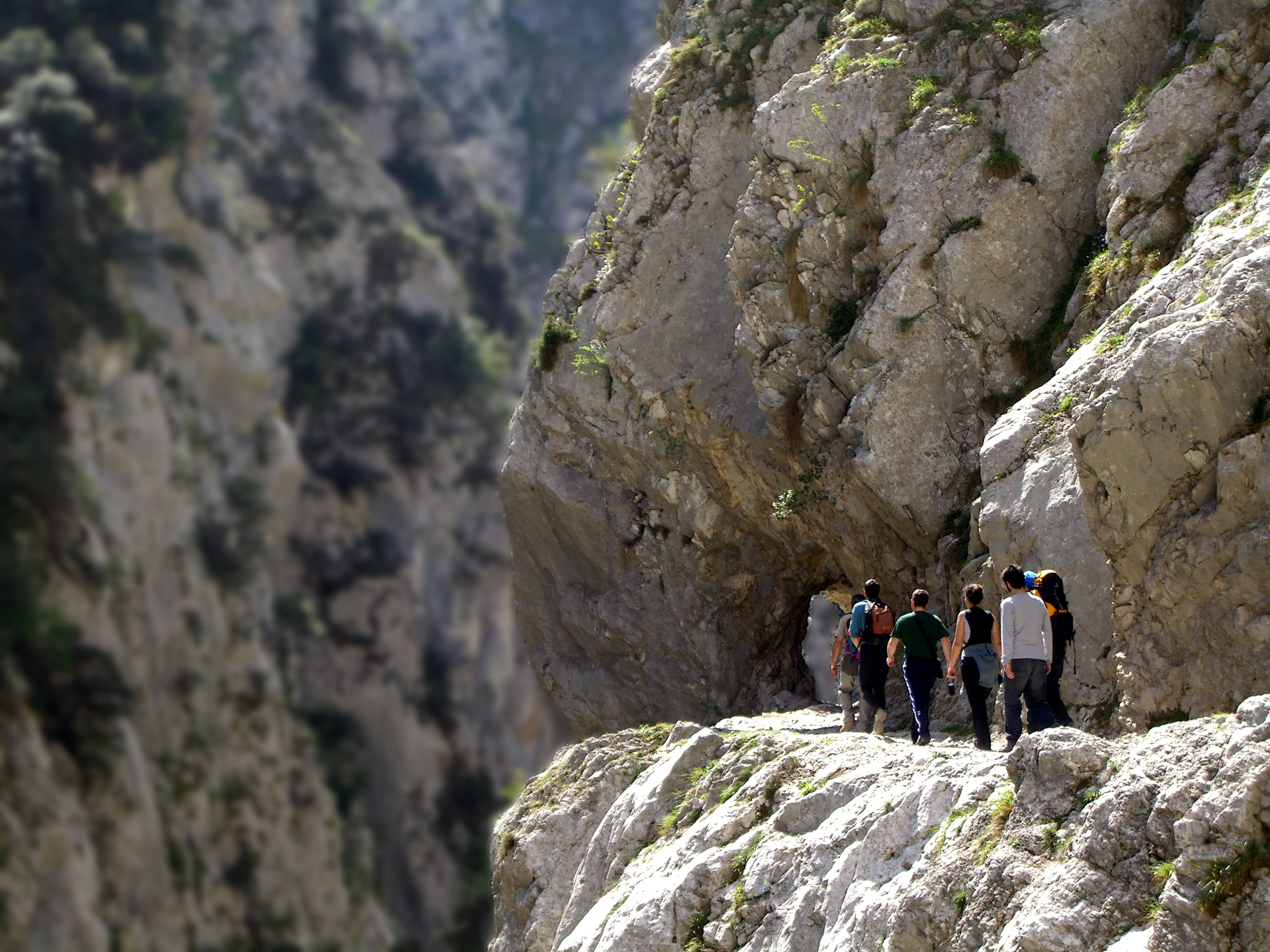
Hiking in the Cares Trail

== Hiking ==
The spectacular scenery and the moderate gradient of the Cares Trail make it ideal for hiking. Out of the two million estimated visitors to the Picos de Europa National Park it is estimated that the Cares trail receives approximately 300.000 hikers as it is the most popular within the National Park. To avoid hiking accidents the use of proper footwear is advised.

== See also ==
- Picos de Europa National Park
- Cares River

== Image Gallery ==
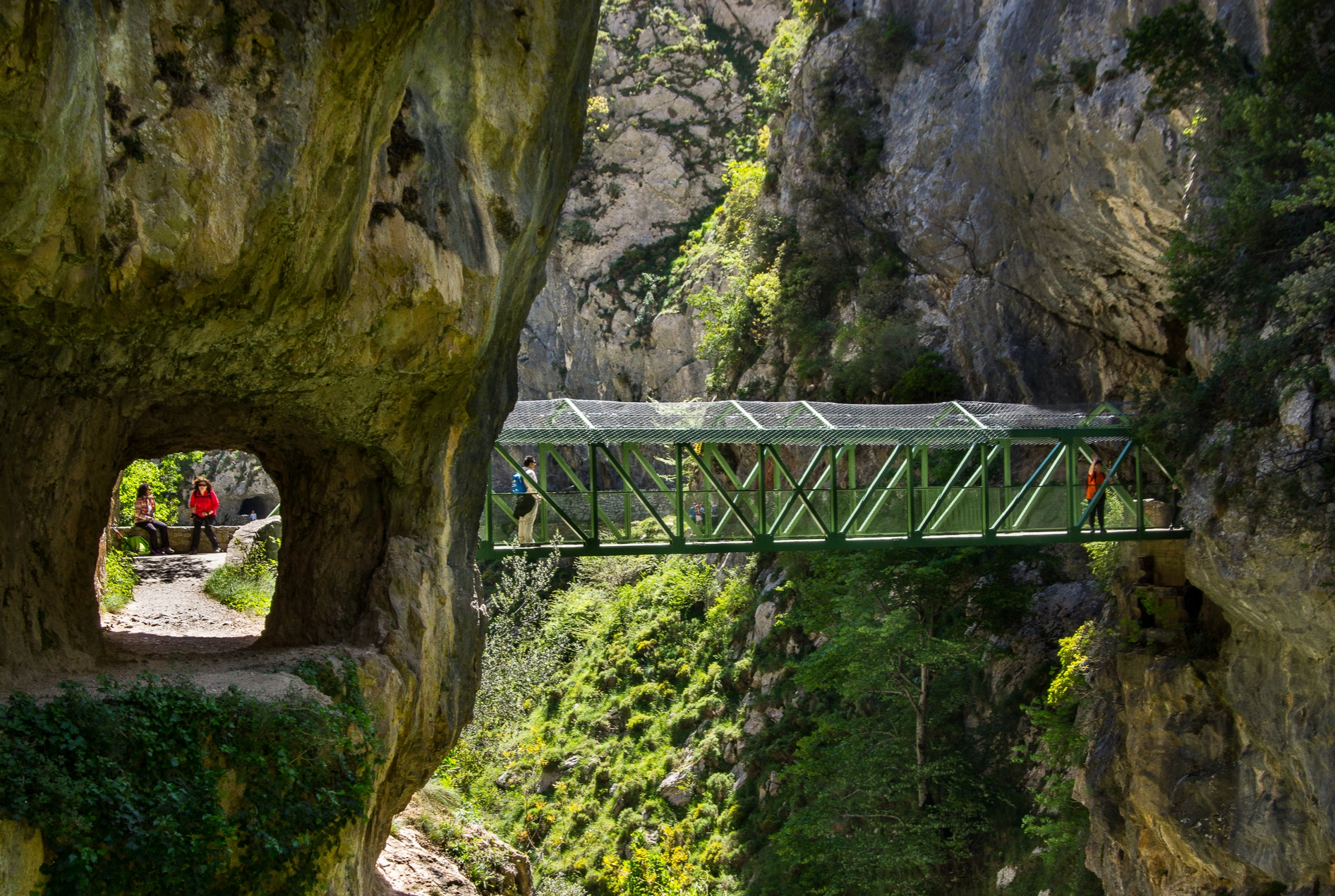
Cares Trail

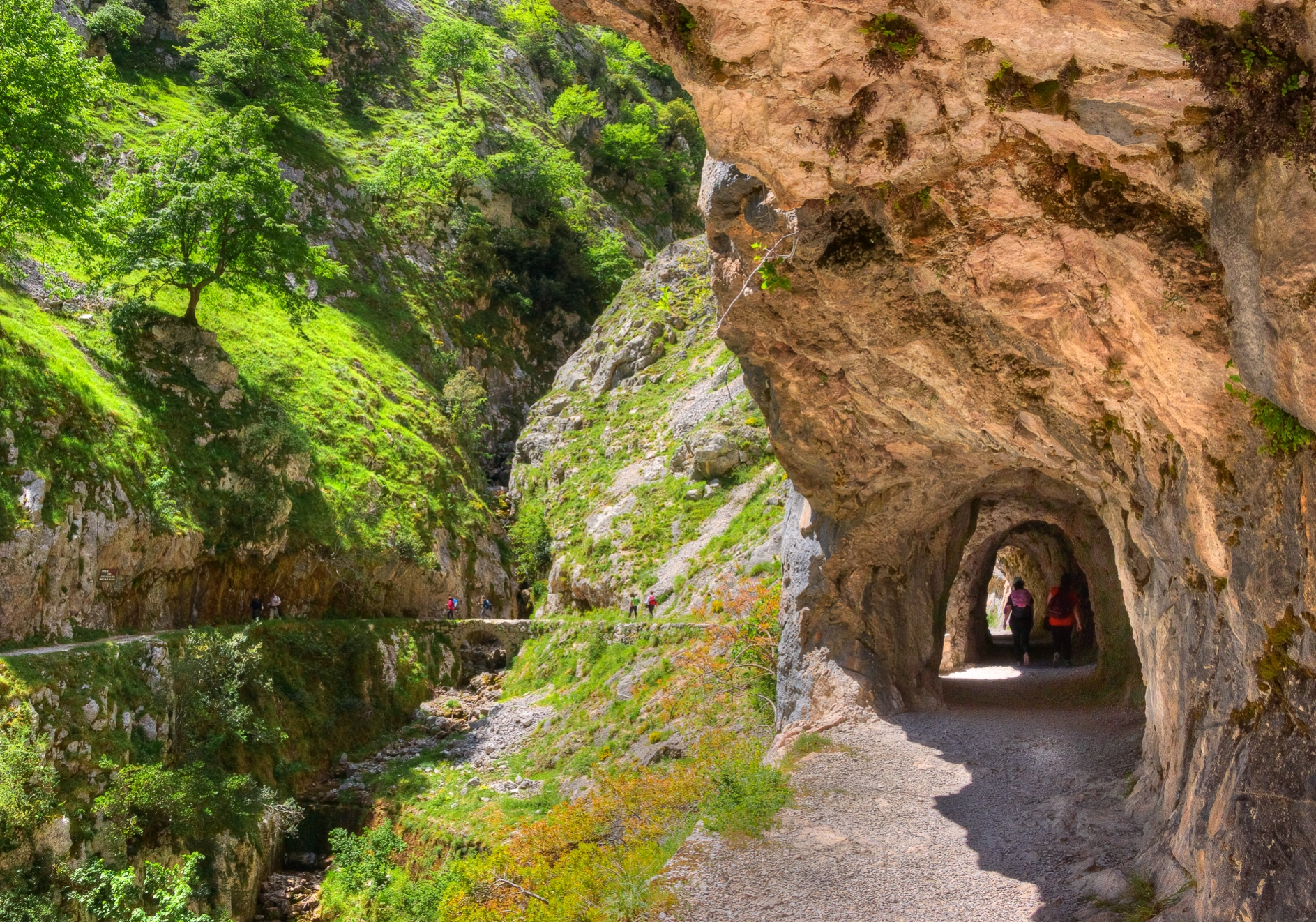
Cares Trail, pass through cave

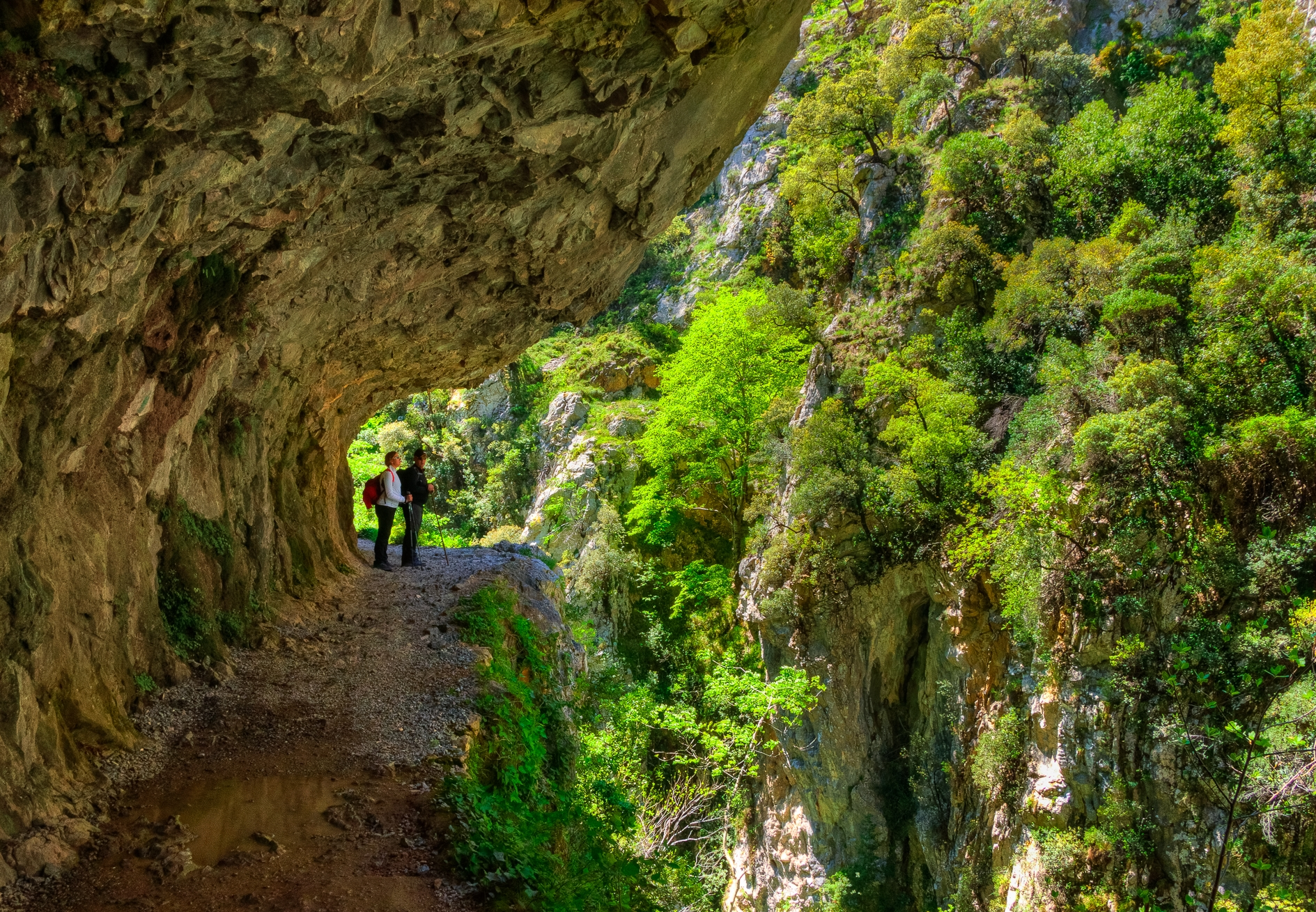
Cares Trail

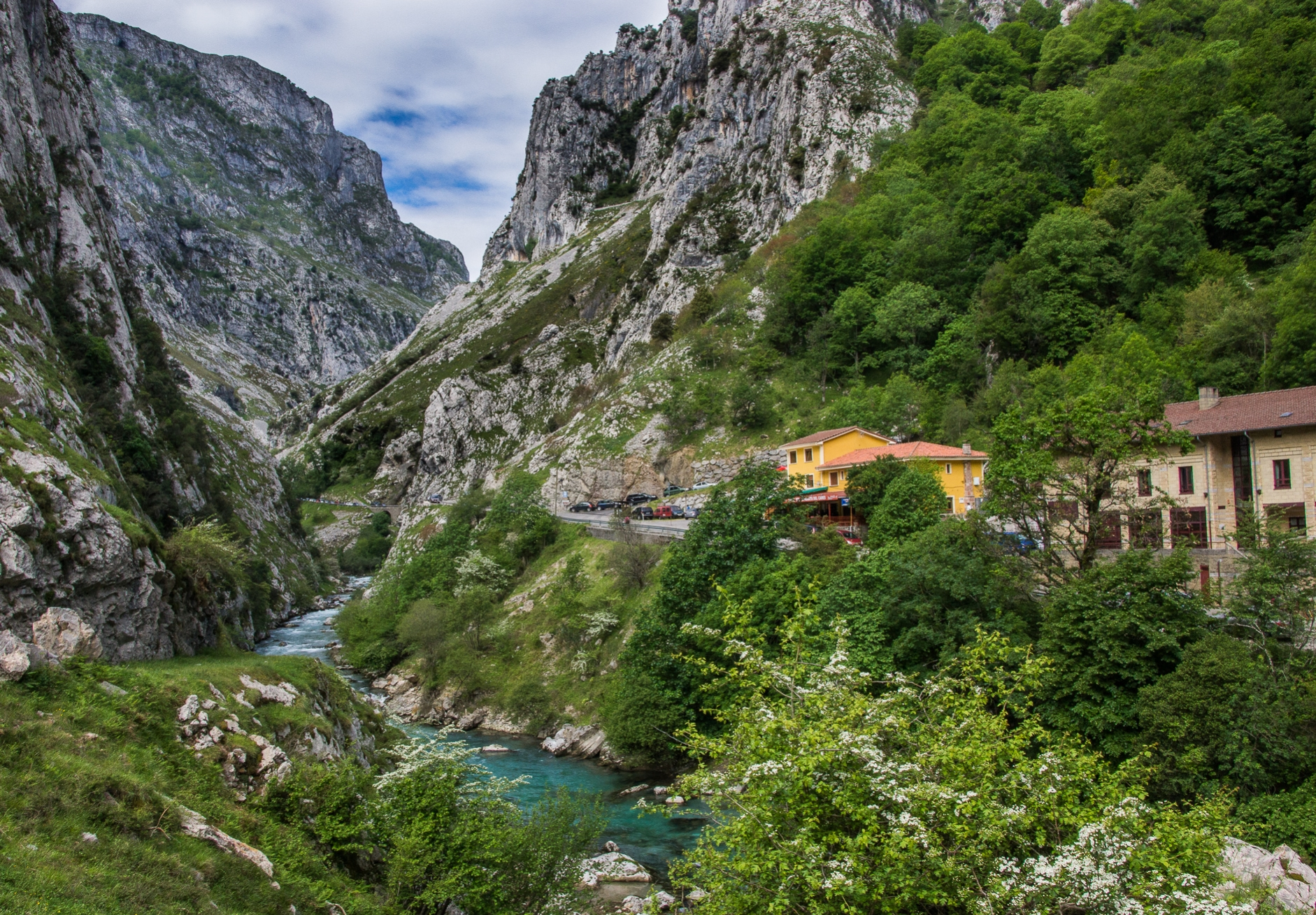
Beginning of the trail in Asturias
