= Torre de las Llastrias =

Mountain in Spain

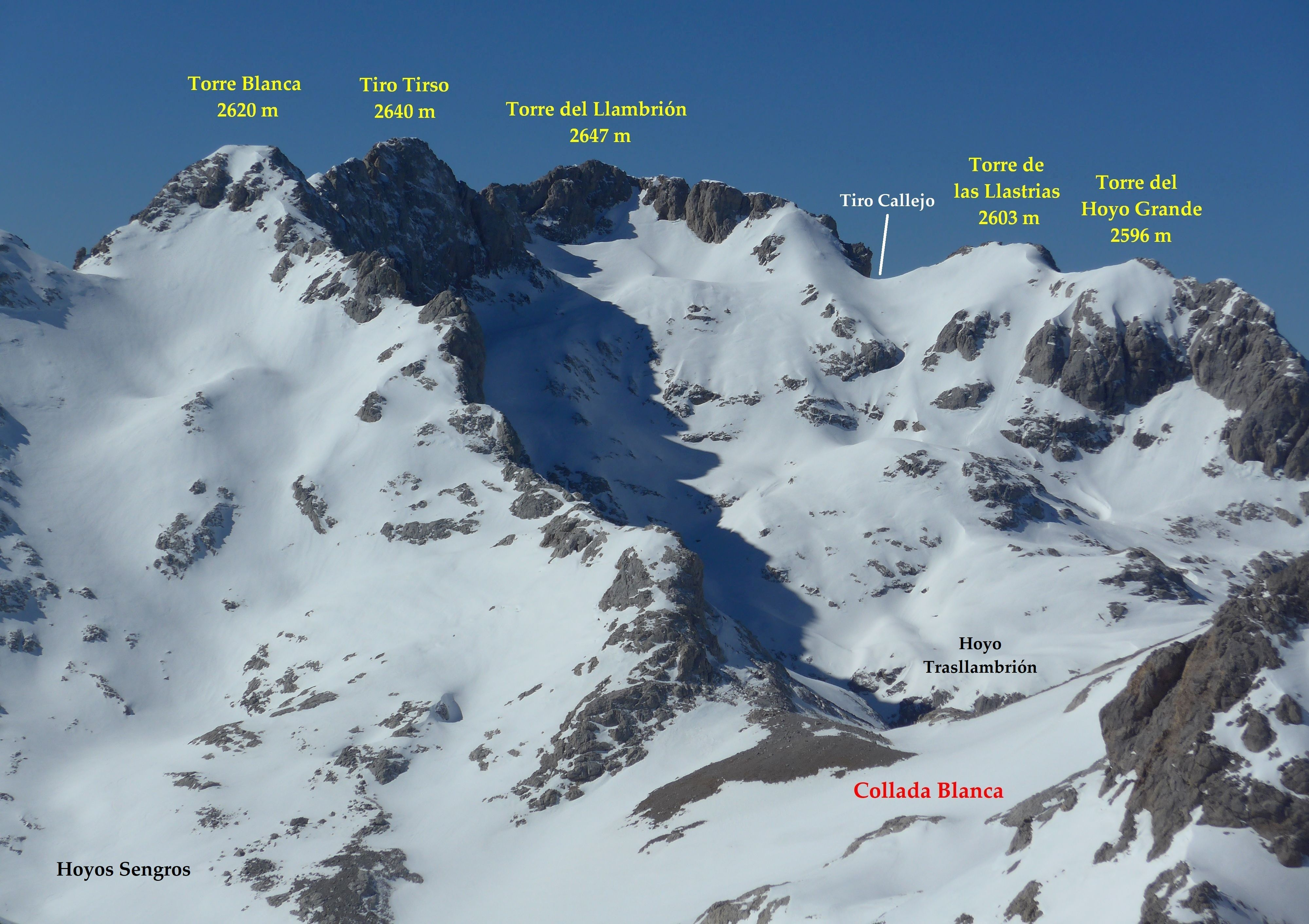
- Photo taken from the Torre de los Horcados Rojos

Highest point
- Elevation: 2,603 m (8,540 ft)
- Prominence: 32 m (105 ft)
- Coordinates: 43°10′32″N 4°51′25″W

Geography
- Location: Posada de Valdeón, Province of León, Spain
- Parent range: Macizo de los Urrieles

Climbing
- Easiest route: From Fuente Dé, the upper station of El Cable and Collado Jermoso

The Torre de las Llastrias is a mountain in the Cantabrian Mountains located in the central massif of the Picos de Europa. It has an elevation of 2603 meters. It is situated between the Torre del Llambrión (separated from it by the Tiro Callejo pass) and the Torre del Hoyo Grande. Administratively, it belongs to the municipality of Posada de Valdeón in León.

There is some controversy regarding the elevation of this mountain, as according to the map of the National Geographic Institute (IGN), the Torre de las Llastrias measures 2603 and, according to the official map of Picos de Europa drawn by Miguel Ángel Adrados, 2621. However, by comparison with other nearby elevations, such as the Torre del Llambrión, the first of the two measurements is more convincing.

== Access routes ==
One of the mountaineering routes to reach the Torre de las Llastrias starts from the upper station of El Cable, above Fuente Dé (Cantabria). This itinerary follows the PR-PNPE 23, the refuge of Cabaña Verónica, Hoyos Sengros, the Collada Blanca and the Hoyo Trasllambrión.

The summit can also be accessed from the province of León via the Hoyo del Llambrión and Tiro Callejo, starting from the refuge of Collado Jermoso.
