= Regalism =

Spanish philosophy of church & state

Regalism is the idea that the monarch has supremacy over the Church as an institution, often specifically referring to the Spanish monarchy and the Catholic Church in the Spanish Empire. Regalists sought reforms that "were intended to redefine the clergy as a professional class of spiritual specialists with fewer judicial and administrative responsibilities and less independence than in Habsburg times."

== Origins ==
Regalism evolved in Spain from a narrow focus on the excesses of the Catholic Church's secular authority to a doctrine that emphasized the supreme power of the monarchy and its role in society and in the international order. Starting in the 1970s, some historians have viewed regalism as being rooted in the Patronato Real, the crown's power of appointment of ecclesiastics to Church offices granted to the Catholic Monarchs, Isabel and Ferdinand, giving monarchy the power of appointment of ecclesiastics in their overseas realms of Spanish America and later the Philippines. The original Patronato Real for overseas appointments did not extend to Spain itself. Regalism emerged in the eighteenth century when the Bourbon monarchs of Spain sought to revitalize its peninsular and ultramarine empire. It drew upon other European intellectual traditions that were incorporated and transformed by Spanish intellectuals to become state policy. Although regalists sought crown control over many matters over which the church claimed authority, they considered themselves pious and orthodox in their beliefs.

According to historian Gabriel Paquette, regalism differs from Jansenism, but that they share some commonalities, including opposition to papal power, and a secular, utilitarian spirit. The papacy sought to maintain its power in what was termed ultramontanism, which emphasized the Pope's power regarding the Church in all its spheres of activity. Unlike Jansenism, regalism was concerned with power politics rather than metaphysics, and with the power of the state rather than the Church's welfare.

== Implementation ==
Regalism's origins were in the medieval period, but under increasingly under the Bourbon monarchy after 1700, regalists asserted authority over all ecclesiastical institutions, including the Inquisition. As early as the rule of Philip V claimed the power of appointment to church benefices in Spain, which had been the prerogative of the papacy. At the end of Hapsburg rule under the weak Charles II the papacy had reasserted control over appointments. Of major importance was the Spanish crown's assertion of the exclusive right of taxation in Spain. The number of bishops was reduced but the Bourbon monarchy sought to take back that power, putting appointments back in the hands of the crown. Any disputes could not be resolved directly with the papacy, but were required to go through the Spanish crown. Centralization of crown authority in Spain under the Bourbons did not simply apply to Church-State relations, as can be seen with Philip V's elimination privileges of the kingdom of Aragon and of Catalonia in the Nueva Planta decrees, so that Spain became a unified and centralized administration over practically all of Spain, except the Basque country and Navarre. Under Charles III of Spain and his heir Charles IV, regalism became the doctrine animating the centralization of power in the monarchy and emanating from Madrid. Most debates over what regalism has constituted focus on Church-State relations, especially over property and temporal authority. Regalists saw the Church's only sphere as the spiritual. The papacy and the Spanish crown negotiated a concordat in 1737 which granted the crown the right of appointment to benefices in Spain and to receive revenues previously directed to the papacy.

Regalists contended that the monarchy was to have power in the temporal sphere of life on earth. The papacy had no right to nullify the monarchy's exercise of temporal power. The regalists sought to diminish the papacy's influence on political life in Spain. A way to undermine clerical autonomy was to restrict or eliminate the Church's jurisdiction over clerics and make them subject to the monarchy's power, as with any other subjects of the crown. The crown eliminated ecclesiastical privileges (fuero eclesiástico) that had given only canonical courts jurisdiction over priests, no matter what the offense, and gave royal courts jurisdiction. The crown also initiated the secularization of parishes, that is taking them out of the hands of the religious orders and placing them under the authority of the secular or diocesan clergy. Regulation of unruly behavior was taken out the hands of priests and put into royal officials' hands.

=== Expulsion of the Jesuits ===
Regalists were especially hostile to the Society of Jesus, the "soldiers of the Pope". The society was expelled from Spain under Charles III and the Spanish Empire in 1767 and its rich landed estates were sold off, and its frontier missions turned over to other religious orders.

Marquis of Pombal also instituted many policies that opposed the jesuits, mainly their expulsion from Portugal and all of its colonies in 1759.

=== Leading regalists ===
In Spain, leading regalists were the Marquis of Ensenada; the Count of Campomanes and the Count of Floridablanca, as well as Francisco de Carrasco, head of the treasury, José Nicolás de Azara, the Spanish Representative to the Papacy; José de Gálvez., former Inspector General (Visitador) in New Spain who implemented the Bourbon Reforms and later became head of the Council of the Indies. They sought the "expansion of state power in order to modernize Spanish society" and to return Spain to its previous preeminent position in geopolitics.

== See also ==
- Bourbon Reforms
- Enlightenment in Spain
- History of Spain (1700–1808)
- Ultramontanism
