= Mier, Asturias =

Mier
- Parish
- Location within Spain
- Coordinates: 43.316667°N 4.666667°W
- Country: Spain
- Autonomous community: Asturias
- Province: Asturias
- Municipality: Peñamellera Alta

Population
  - Total: 28

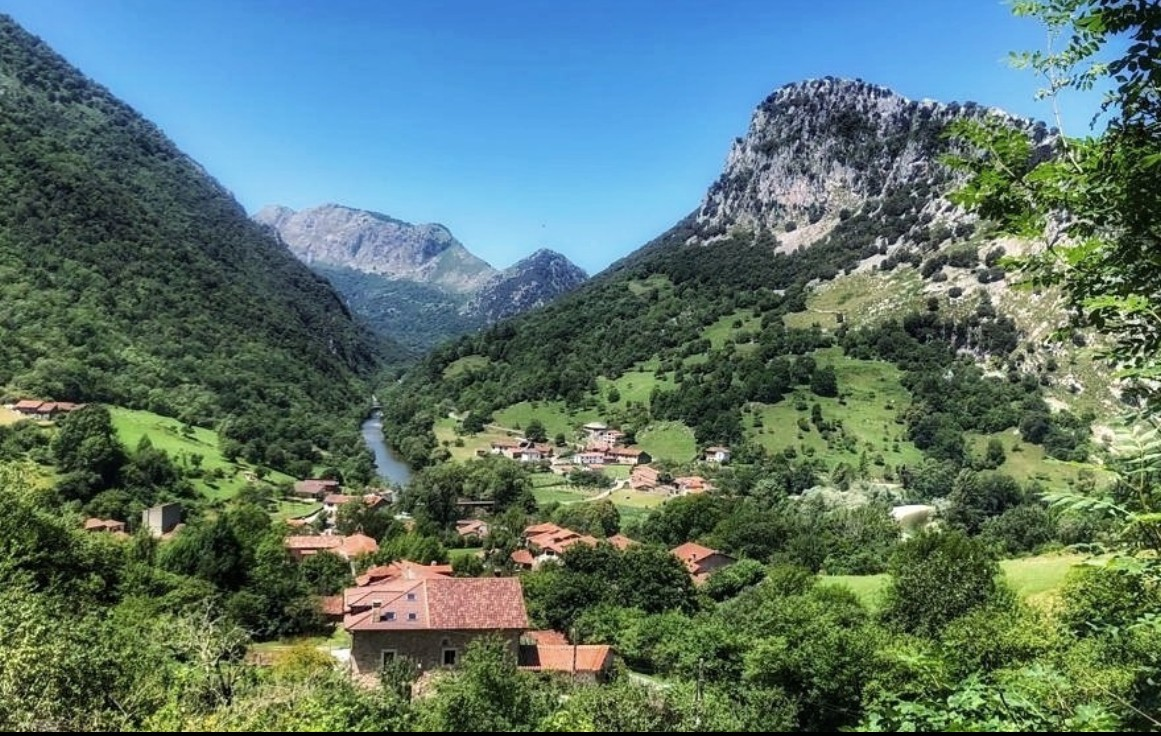
Mier, Asturias

Mier is one of eight parishes (administrative divisions) in Peñamellera Alta, a municipality within the province and autonomous community of Asturias, in northern Spain. The population is 28 (INE 2007).

Mier is located in the Picos de Europa National Park and is divided in two neighbourhoods by the River Cares: Mier d'Acá and Mier d'Allá. One of Spain's deepest caves is located in Mier.

== See also ==
- List of caves in Spain
