= José del Campillo =

Spanish statesman

José del Campillo y Cossío
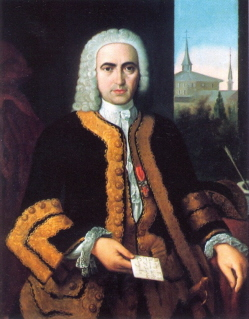
- Born: 1693; Alles, Asturias
- Died: 1743 (aged 49–50); Madrid
- Occupation: Diplomat

José del Campillo y Cossío (February 13, 1693 in Alles, Peñamellera Alta, Asturias – April 11, 1743 in Madrid), was a Spanish statesman. His writings were influential in shaping the Spanish monarchy's reorganization of its empire, known as the Bourbon Reforms.

== Life ==
Campillo was of very obscure origin. From his own account of his youth, written to Antonio de Mier in 1726, we only know that he was born in "a house equally poor and honest," that he studied Latin by his own wish, that he entered the service of Don Antonio Maldonado, prebendary of Córdoba, who wished apparently to train him as a priest, and that he declined to take orders. He left the service of Maldonado in 1713, being then eighteen years of age. In 1715 he became "page" to Don Francisco de Ocio, superintendent general of customs, who doubtless employed him as a clerk.

In 1717, he attracted the favorable notice of José Patiño, the head of the newly organized navy, and was by him transferred to the naval department. Under the protection of Patiño, who became prime minister in 1726, Campillo was constantly employed on naval administrative work both at home and in America. It was Patino's policy to build up a navy quietly at home and in America, without attracting too much attention abroad, and particularly in England. Campillo proved an industrious and honest subordinate. Part of his experience was to be present at a shipwreck in Central America in which he was credited with showing spirit and practical ability in saving the lives of the crew.

In 1726 he was denounced to the Inquisition for the offence of reading forbidden books. The proceedings against him were not carried further, but the incident is an example of the vexatious tyranny exercised by the Holy Office, and the effect it must have had even in its decadence in damping all intellectual activity.

Between 1733 and 1737 he was Intendent of the Spanish army sent to Italy during the War of Polish Succession. After his return he became Intendent General of Army of Aragon.

In 1741, when Spain was entangled in a land war in Italy and a naval war with England, Campillo was summoned by King Philip V of Spain to take the place of minister of Finance, Navy, War and Indies. He had to find the means of carrying on a policy out of all proportion to the resources of Spain, with an empty treasury. His short tenure of power was chiefly notable for his vigorous attempt to sweep away the system of farming the taxes, which left the state at the mercy of contractors and financiers. Campillo's predecessors were constantly compelled to apply to capitalists to provide funds to meet the demands of the king for his buildings and his foreign policy.

A whole year's revenue was frequently forestalled. Campillo persuaded the king to allow him to establish a system of direct collection, by which waste and pilfering would be avoided. Some progress was made towards putting the national finances on a sound footing, though Campillo could not prevent the king from disposing, without his knowledge, of large sums of money needed for the public service. He died suddenly on April 11, 1743.

Campillo was the author of a treatise on a New System of Government for America printed at Madrid 1789. He also left a manuscript treatise with the curious title, What is superfluous and is wanting in Spain, in order that it may be what it ought to be, and not what it is.
