= Oceño =

Coordinates: 43.3°N 4.733333°W

- Parish
- Interactive map of Oceño
- Country: Spain
- Autonomous community: Asturias
- Province: Asturias
- Municipality: Peñamellera Alta

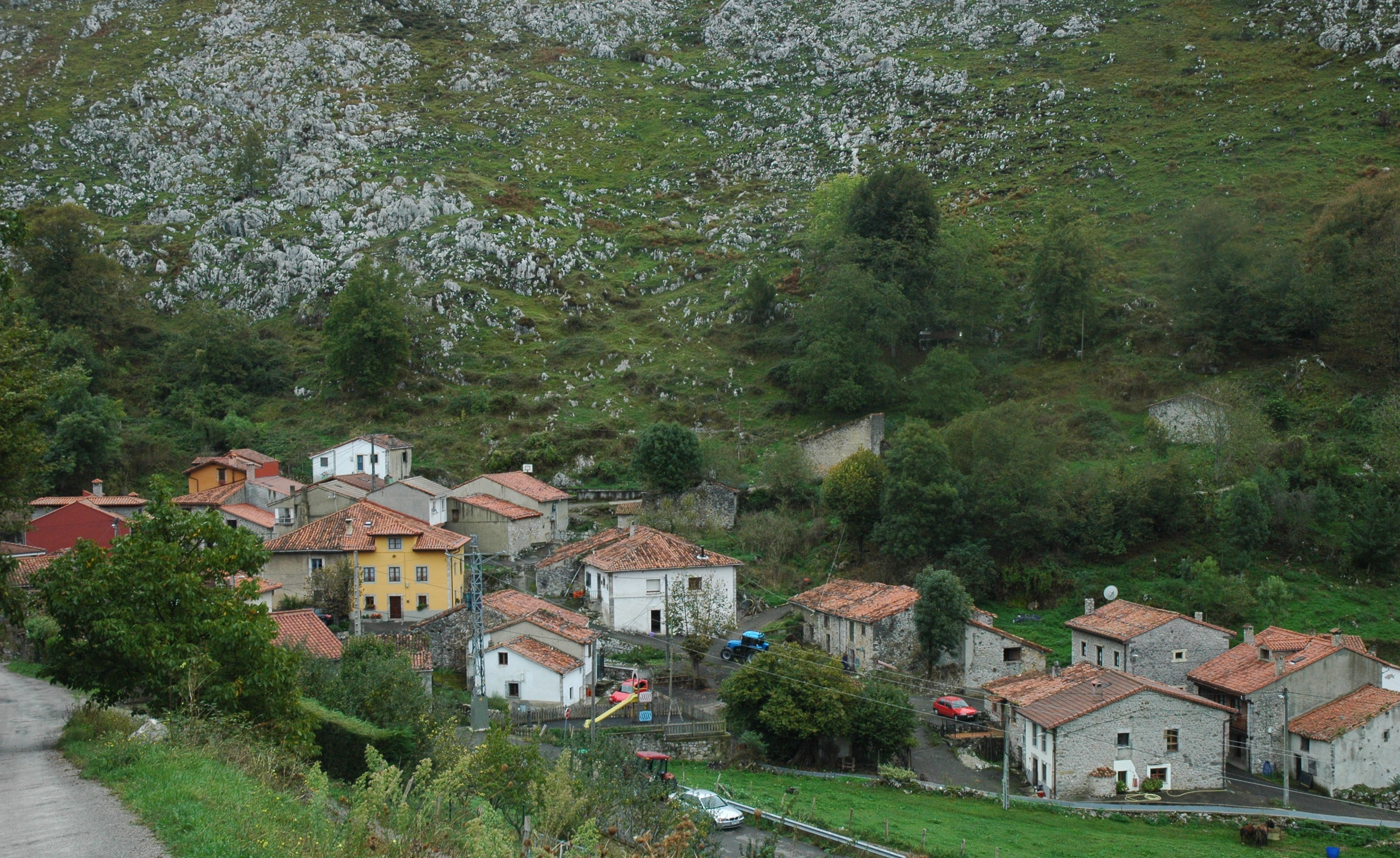
View over Oceño

Oceño is one of eight parishes (administrative divisions) in Peñamellera Alta, a municipality within the province and autonomous community of Asturias, in northern Spain. It is located in the Picos de Europa National Park.

The population is 47 (INE 2016).
