= Peñamellera Alta =

Peñamellera Alta El Valle Altu de Peñamellera (Asturian)
- Municipality
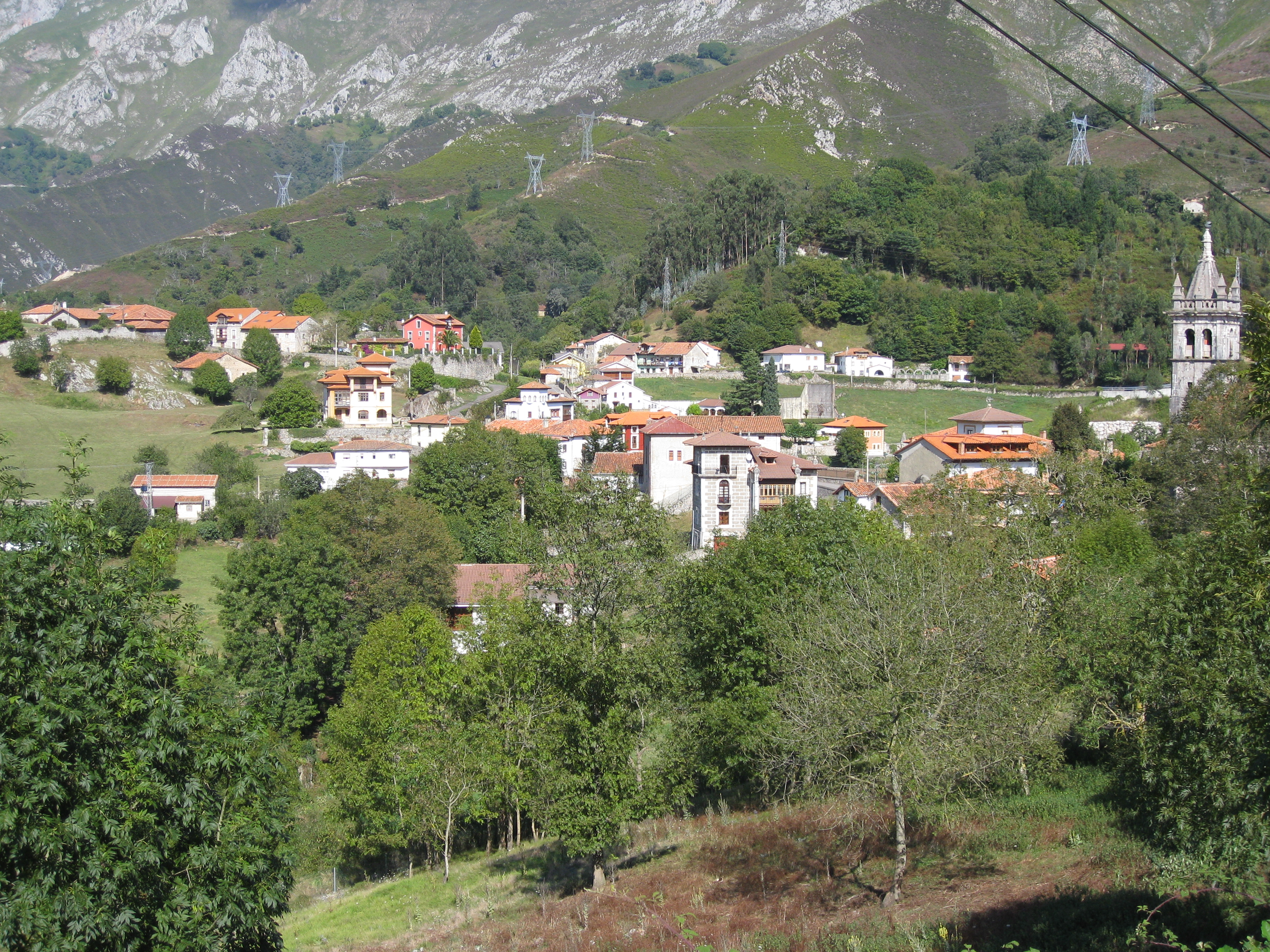
- View of the village of Alles.

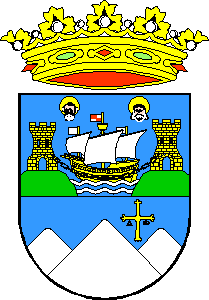
- Coat of arms

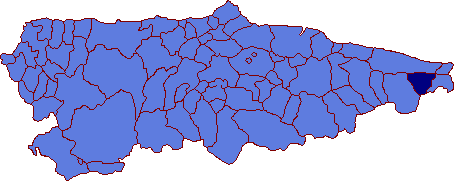

- Location in Spain
- Coordinates: 43°19′12″N 4°42′36″W
- Country: Spain
- Autonomous community: Asturias
- Province: Asturias
- Comarca: Oriente
- Judicial district: Llanes

Government
  - Alcalde: Rosa María Domínguez (PP)

Area
  - Total: 92.19 km^{2} (35.59 sq mi)
- Highest elevation: 1,425 m (4,675 ft)

Population (2025-01-01)
  - Total: 500
  - Density: 5.4/km^{2} (14/sq mi)
- Time zone: UTC+1 (CET)
  - Summer (DST): UTC+2 (CEST)
- Website: Official website

Peñamellera Alta (in asturian: El Valle Altu de Peñamellera) is a municipality in the Autonomous Community of the Principality of Asturias, Spain. It is bordered on the north by Llanes, on the west by Cabrales, on the east by Peñamellera Baja and on the south by the Autonomous Community of Cantabria.

== Parishes ==
- Alles
- Cáraves
- Llonín
- Mier
- Oceño
- Rozagás
- Ruenes
- Trescares

== Main sights ==
- Ruins of the church of San Pedro de Plecín
- Parish church of San Pedro, in Alles

== Gastronomy ==
One of the most famous products of the municipality is the Peñamellera cheese. It is the heir to a long tradition of artisanship. Despite the fact that it was near the point of disappearing, it has grown in recent years due to the establishment of a cooperative to produce it.

Another famous food from the region is the salmon from the Cares River. The honey of Peñamellera, used in desserts, deserves mention also.

The traditional drink of the municipality, like the rest of the principality, is cider.

== See also ==
- List of municipalities in Asturias
