= Cáraves =

- Parish
- Location within Spain
- Coordinates: 43.316667°N 4.716667°W
- Country: Spain
- Autonomous community: Asturias
- Province: Asturias
- Municipality: Peñamellera Alta

Cáraves is one of eight parishes (administrative divisions) in Peñamellera Alta, a municipality within the province and autonomous community of Asturias, in northern Spain.

The population is 22 (INE 2007).
