= Ruenes =

Coordinates: 43.333333°N 4.733333°W

- Parish
- Interactive map of Ruenes
- Country: Spain
- Autonomous community: Asturias
- Province: Asturias
- Municipality: Peñamellera Alta

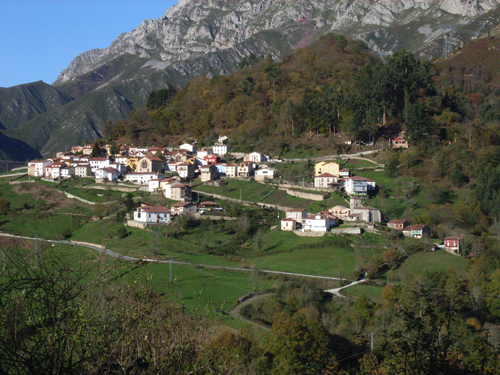
Panorama of Ruenes.

Ruenes is one of eight parishes (administrative divisions) in Peñamellera Alta, a municipality within the province and autonomous community of Asturias, in northern Spain.

The population is 142 (INE 2007).
