= Llonín =

Coordinates: 43.333333°N 4.65°W

- Parish
- Interactive map of Llonín
- Country: Spain
- Autonomous community: Asturias
- Province: Asturias
- Municipality: Peñamellera Alta

Llonín is one of eight parishes (administrative divisions) in Peñamellera Alta, a municipality within the province and autonomous community of Asturias, in northern Spain.

The population is 83 (INE 2007).

There was prehistoric cave art discovered at Llonín.
