= Trescares =

Coordinates: 43.316667°N 4.7°W

- Parish
- Interactive map of Trescares
- Country: Spain
- Autonomous community: Asturias
- Province: Asturias
- Municipality: Peñamellera Alta

Trescares is one of eight parishes (administrative divisions) in Peñamellera Alta, a municipality within the province and autonomous community of Asturias, in northern Spain. It is located in the Picos de Europa National Park.

The population is 55 (INE 2007).

In this village, there are two of the most important buildings of this autonomy: the church and, the most important, La Vidre bridge (El Puente La Vidre), built in the romanic time over another bridge that was constructed by the Romans. Today's bridge is known worldwide, and so, a lot of spots are made in it.

Here it pass one of the most important rivers of Asturias, the Cares river (El Río Cares), which ends in the river Deva that separates the community of Asturias and Cantabria. One of the sports more played is the fishing,

Like another village, Trescares has its feast: Saint Fausto. This is celebrated on the following Saturday of The Pilar (national feast), in which the Trescares people wear asturian dresses and offer a two metres high bouquet to the Saint.
