= Alles, Asturias =

Alles
- Parish
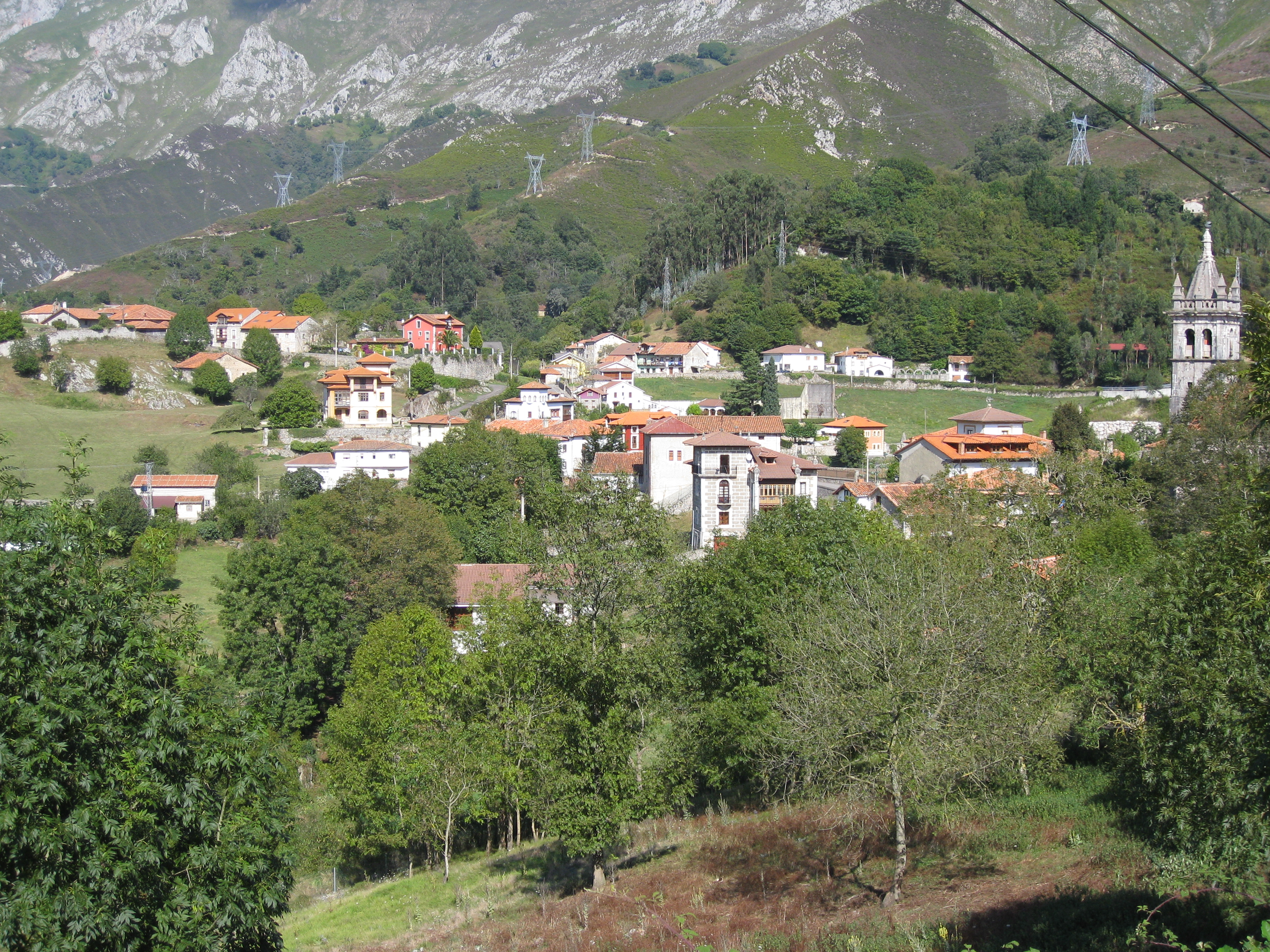

- Location within Spain
- Coordinates: 43.333333°N 4.7°W
- Country: Spain
- Autonomous community: Asturias
- Province: Asturias
- Municipality: Peñamellera Alta

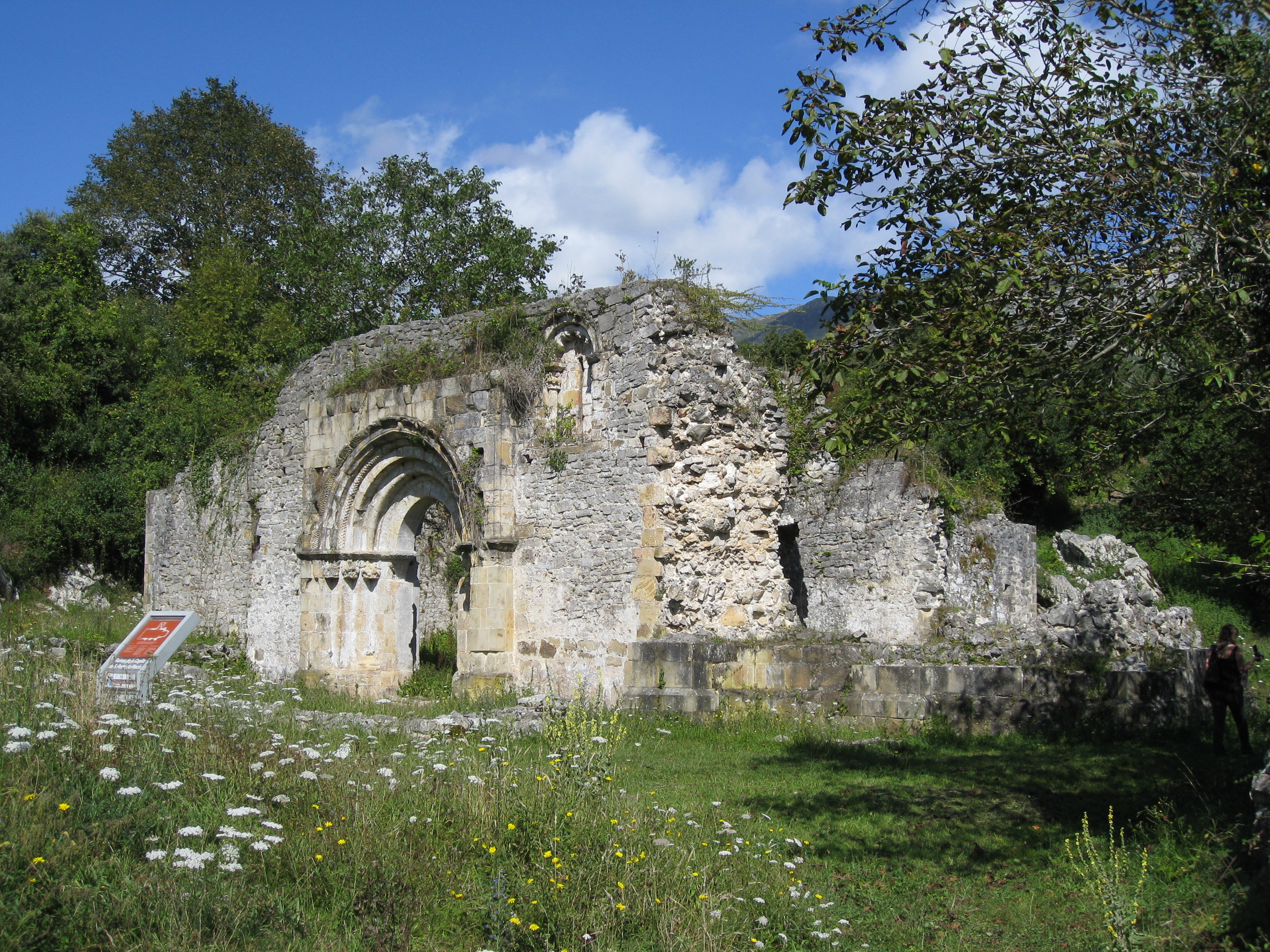
Church of San Pedro de Plecín, in Alles.

Alles is one of eight parishes (administrative divisions) in Peñamellera Alta, a municipality within the province and autonomous community of Asturias, in northern Spain. The ruined Church of San Pedro de Plecín is in the town.
