= Nolo episcopari =

Latin expression

The Latin expression nolo episcopari is the traditional formal refusal made by a cleric in the Roman Catholic and Anglican churches of an offer as appointment as a bishop. It means, literally, "I do not wish to be bishoped". A historical myth has arisen that it was customary and decorous for any candidate for a bishopric to decline the office twice by use of the expression, only a third use of which would indicate a true intention of refusal.

Henry Fielding in his 1749 novel The History of Tom Jones, a Foundling uses the phrase to show becoming modesty on the part of a lady asked for in marriage:

He soon found means to make his addresses, in express terms, to his mistress, from whom he received an answer in the proper form, viz: the answer which was first made some thousands of years ago, and which hath been handed down by tradition from mother to daughter ever since. If I was to translate this into Latin, I should render it by these two words: Nolo episcopari.

George Eliot in her 1861 novel Silas Marner also uses the phrase to indicate that the landlord of the Rainbow agreed to go to the constable on behalf of the company only after showing the requisite modesty:

The landlord agreed with this view, and after taking the sense of the company, and duly rehearsing a small ceremony known in high ecclesiastical life as the nolo episcopari, he consented to take on himself the chill dignity of going to Kench’s.

== Sources ==
- The World of Dr. Justice, blogspot, Sunday, September 22, 2013, Phrase of the Day: nolo episcopari
