= Cares =

River in Spain

Coordinates: 43.3219°N 4.6056°W

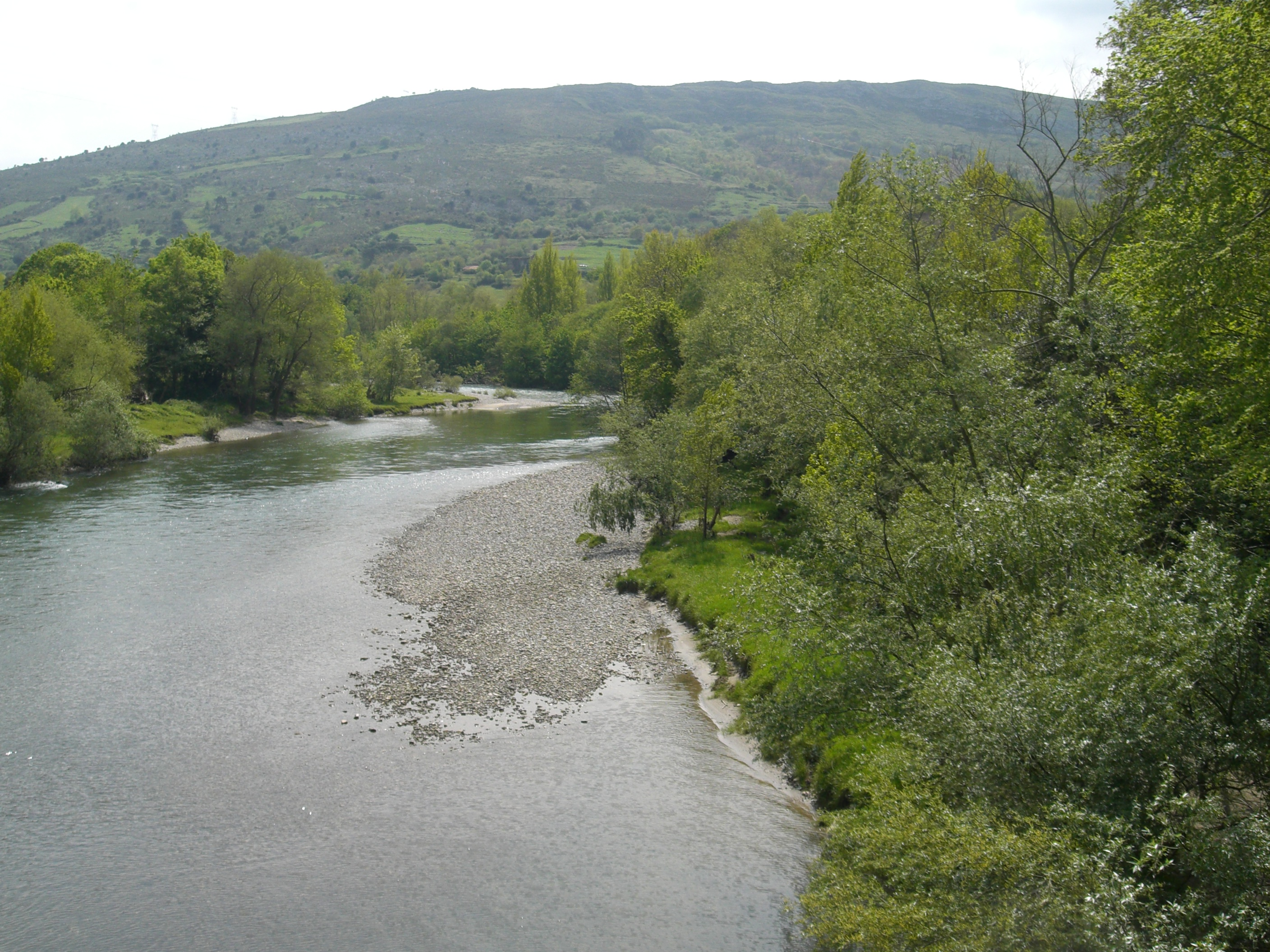

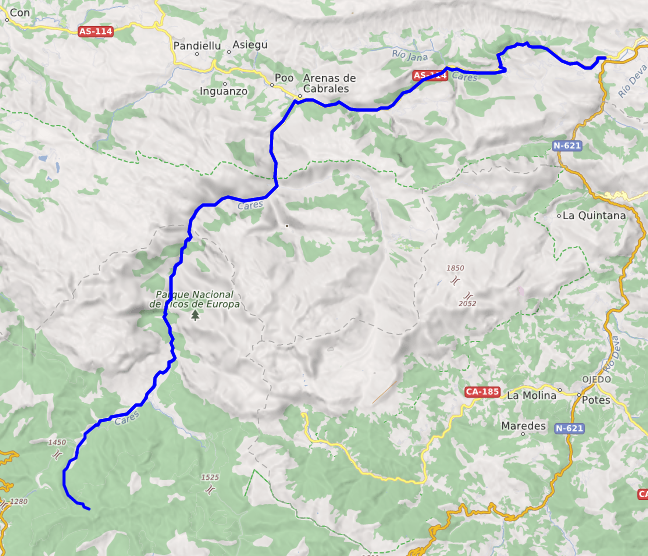
- Course of the Cares

Location
- Country: Spain
- State: León, Asturias
- Cities: Posada de Valdeón, Caín, Poncebos, Arenas de Cabrales

Physical characteristics
- Source
  - location: Posada de Valdeón, Cantabrian Mountains, León
  - elevation: 1,600 m (5,200 ft)
- Mouth
  - location: Vega del Llés, Asturias
- Length: 54 km (34 mi)

Basin features
- River system: Deva River
- Tributaries
  - left: Casaño
  - right: Duje, Bulnes

The Cares is a river in Northern Spain that flows through the autonomous communities of Asturias and León until it joins the Deva River and flows into the Atlantic Ocean at the Bay of Biscay. It forms the Tina Mayor estuary, the natural border between Asturias and Cantabria.

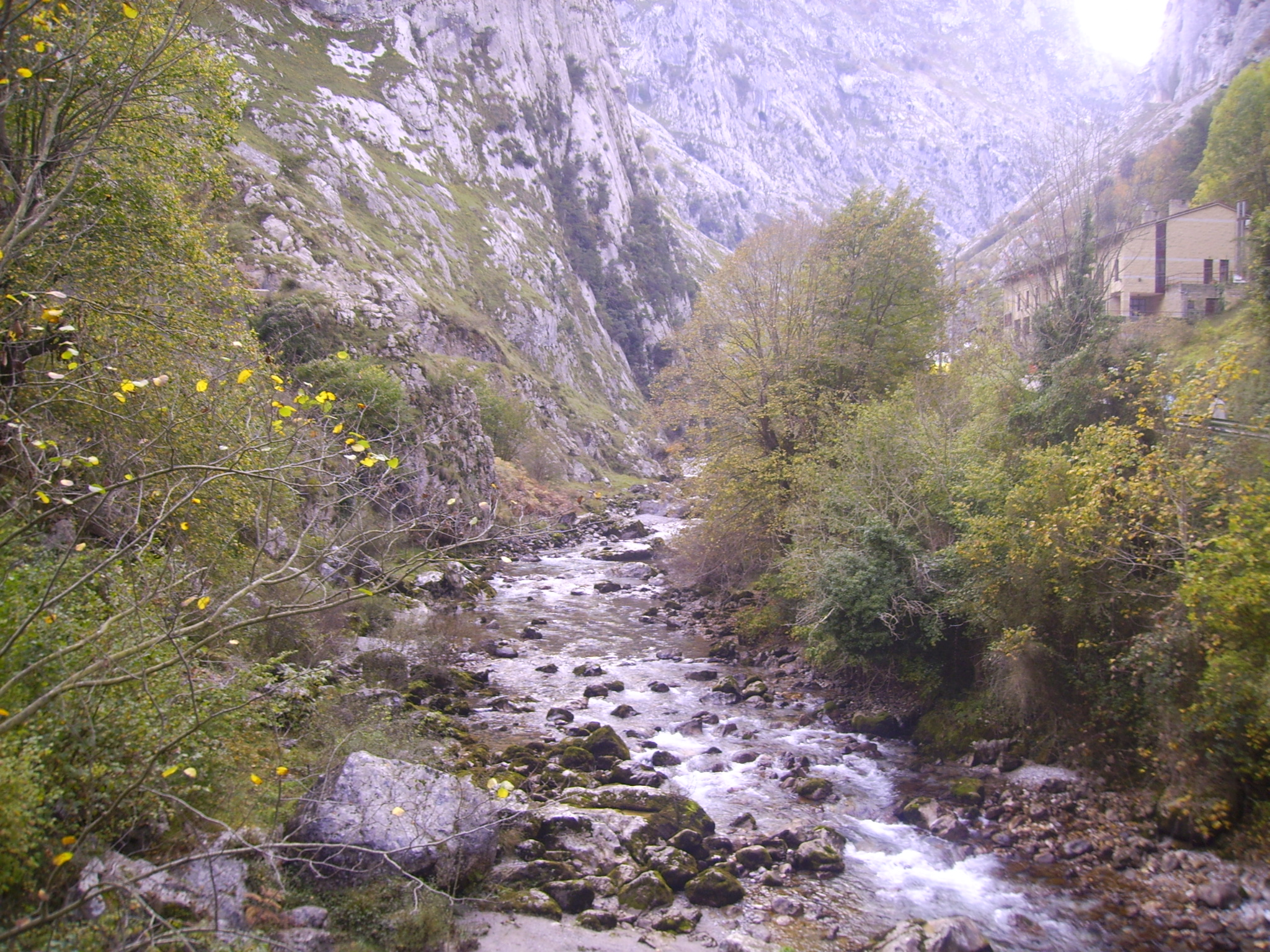
The road by the house is the starting point for the "Ruta del Cares":

The Cares is known because of the narrow and spectacular canyon it forms when passing the Picos de Europa. A trekking path, "Ruta del Cares", runs along the river. The stream is also known for the quality of its salmon.

The Cares river is joined by the Deva river. Many companies rent kayaks to descend both rivers. Kayaking is popular here during the summer.

== See also ==
- List of rivers of Spain
