= Bourbon Reforms =

18th-century reforms in Spain

The Bourbon Reforms (Spanish: Reformismo borbónico, lit. 'Borbonic reformism') were a series of political and economic changes promulgated by the Spanish Crown beginning with Charles III and continuing under various kings of the House of Bourbon, mainly in the 18th century. The beginning of the new Crown's power with clear lines of authority to officials contrasted to the complex system of government that had evolved under the Habsburg monarchs. The crown pursued state control over the Catholic Church in Spain and throughout the global Spanish Empire, pushed economic reforms, and placed power solely into the hands of civil officials, paving the way for the Enlightenment in Spain. The reforms resulted in significant restructuring of administrative structure and personnel. The reforms were intended to modernise Spain through stimulating manufacturing and technology.

In Spanish America, the reforms were designed to make the administration more efficient and to promote economic development. In terms of the relationship between the Spanish Crown and its American colonies, the reforms functionally aimed to transform juridically semi-autonomous groups into proper colonies. Specifically, the reforms sought to increase commercial agriculture, mining, and trade. The system became much more hierarchal, forcing the colonies to become more dependent on Spain and serve as a market for Spanish manufactured goods. The crown ordered these changes in hopes that it would have a positive effect on the economy of Spain. Furthermore, the Bourbon Reforms were intended to limit the power of Criollos and re-establish peninsular supremacy over the colonies.

The reforms achieved mixed results administratively, but alienated the local elites of the Americas (who called themselves Criollos) and eventually led to the independence of all overseas dominions of the Spanish crown. This is not to say that a clean and straight line can be drawn from the Bourbon Reforms to the movements for independence, but rather that the period of unrest that came in the wake of the reforms helped encourage the conditions necessary for local riots, and eventually revolts.

== End of Habsburg era ==
At the end of the 17th century, Spain was an ailing empire, facing declining revenues and the loss of military power, ruled by a weak king, Charles II, who left no successor. Even before his death in 1700, the European powers were already positioning themselves to see which royal house would succeed in placing someone on the Spanish throne and thereby gain its vast empire. Louis XIV of France asked for and received the Pope's consent for his grandson, Philip, Duke of Anjou, a great-nephew of Charles, to take the throne. On his deathbed, Charles willed the crown to the French-born successor, but an international conflict ensued, known as the War of the Spanish Succession, which lasted from 1702 to 1713 and pitted Austria, England, and other European countries against the French House of Bourbon.

== Beginning of Bourbon era ==
Under the terms of the 1713 Peace of Utrecht, which ended the War of the Spanish Succession and secured Philip V's position on the Spanish throne, the new Bourbon dynasty of Spain was forced to make several territorial concessions to foreign powers. This included ceding several of Spain's European territories (including the Habsburg Netherlands) to Austria and Gibraltar and Menorca to Great Britain. Spain also granted the Asiento de Negros, a monopoly contract which allowed the holder to sell African slaves in Spanish America, to the British government, which subsequently gave the contract to the newly formed South Sea Company.

Philip V took measures intended to counter the decline of Spanish power called the Bourbon Reforms. Even before the War of the Spanish Succession, the state of the Spanish Empire was precarious. When Charles II died, the military was practically nonexistent, consisting of only one division; the treasury was bankrupt; and there was no state promotion of commerce or industry. Philip V and his ministers needed to act quickly to reconstruct the empire.

=== French influence ===
The new Bourbon kings kept close ties with France and used many Frenchmen as advisors. French innovations in politics and social manners never fully replaced Spanish laws and traditions but became an important model in both areas. As a result, there was an influx of French goods, ideas, and books, which helped spread the ideas of the Enlightenment throughout the Spanish world. Imperial rivalry and competition was also a large factor of the Bourbon Reforms, and since France was the more dominant power, the Spanish tried to compete with their intellectual power. In a sense, all things French came into fashion during the subsequent century and gave rise to a new type of person, the afrancesado, who welcomed the new influence. Additionally, during the War of the Spanish Succession Spanish America's ports were blockaded by the British and Dutch navies. Spain turned to France for help with the export of its goods, which was the first time in Spanish colonial history that legal trade occurred with a foreign nation. Prior to this, trade between Spanish America and non-Spanish Europeans had all occurred on illicit trade circuits. The new commercial relationship stimulated the colonial economy, especially that of Chile.

== In Mainland Spain ==
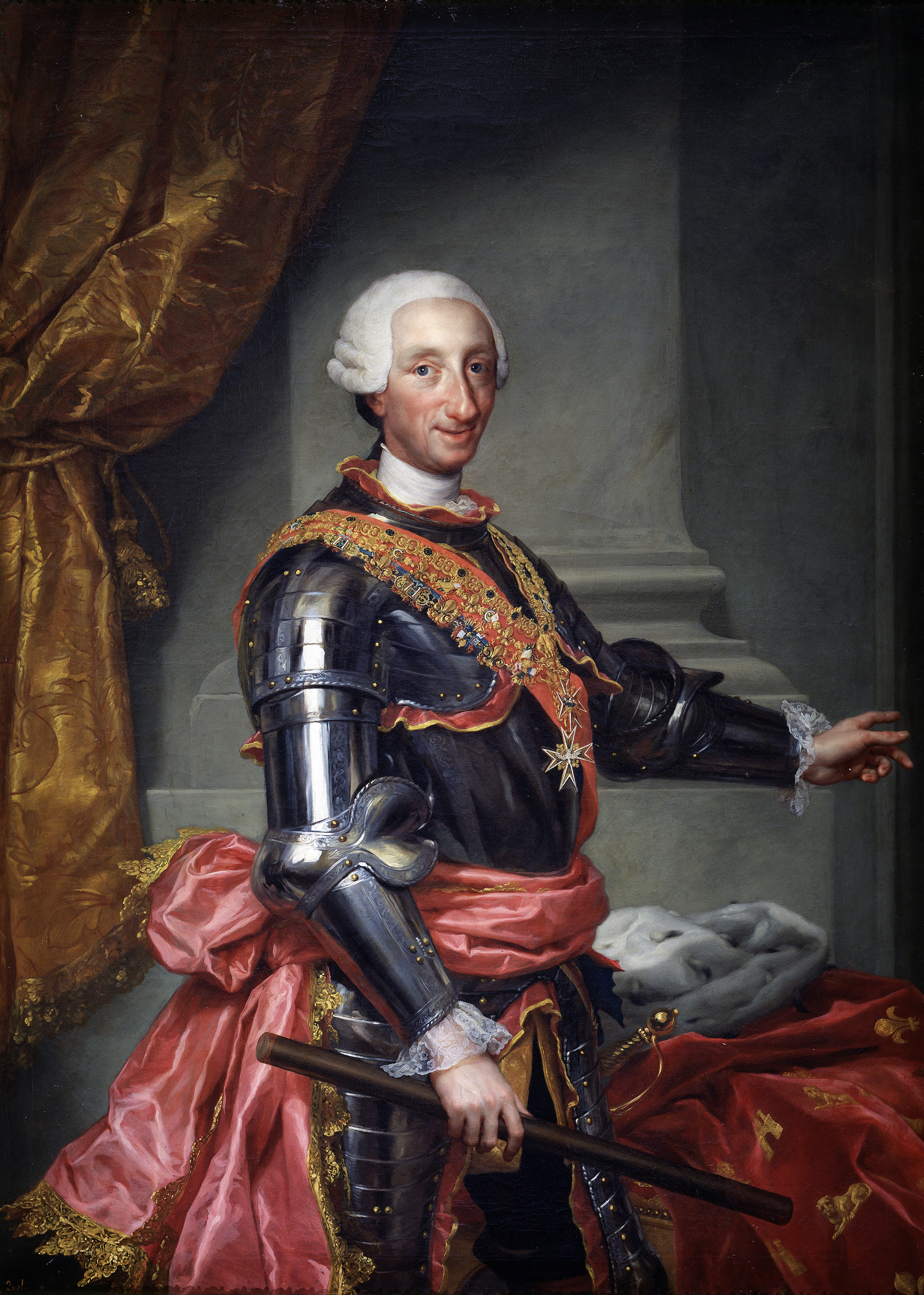
Charles III of Spain, who initiated the vigorous programs of reform.

The early reforms were aimed at improving the economic and political structure of Spain. They sought to modernize agriculture, construction of ships, and infrastructure to monitor and incite economic integration and development on a regional and national level. The Spanish were caught in an ever tightening noose of imperial rivalry abroad with Britain, France and Portugal, which were all fighting for domination over Atlantic trade. Spain's problems with its neighbor were the biggest concern, and the Spanish Bourbons made constant short-term adjustments to colonial and increasingly, continental war-making. War was inevitable as the hegemonic powers were pinned against each other in a quest for expansion. This hindered the nationalization of industries and so disrupted the class system. For example, mercury, a Spanish import, was an essential resource for extracting silver in the mining process, but the French naval blockade dramatically limited imports in Spanish America. As a result, silver plunged downward and mining slumped, which caused revenue to decrease. Ultimately, in 1805, the highland mining districts exploded in revolt. Therefore, it was not the Bourbon Reforms that failed, but rather the role of the conflicts at home that resulted in failure.

The failure of reform measures became evident when Spain, under Charles III, was defeated during the Seven Years' War by Great Britain. Charles III's counselors sought more detailed reports of Spain's overseas territories/and now understood the need to take them fully into account. The new wave of reforms included larger exploitation of resources in the colonies, increased taxes, the opening of new ports allowed to trade only with Spain, and the establishment of several state monopolies.

== Spanish America ==
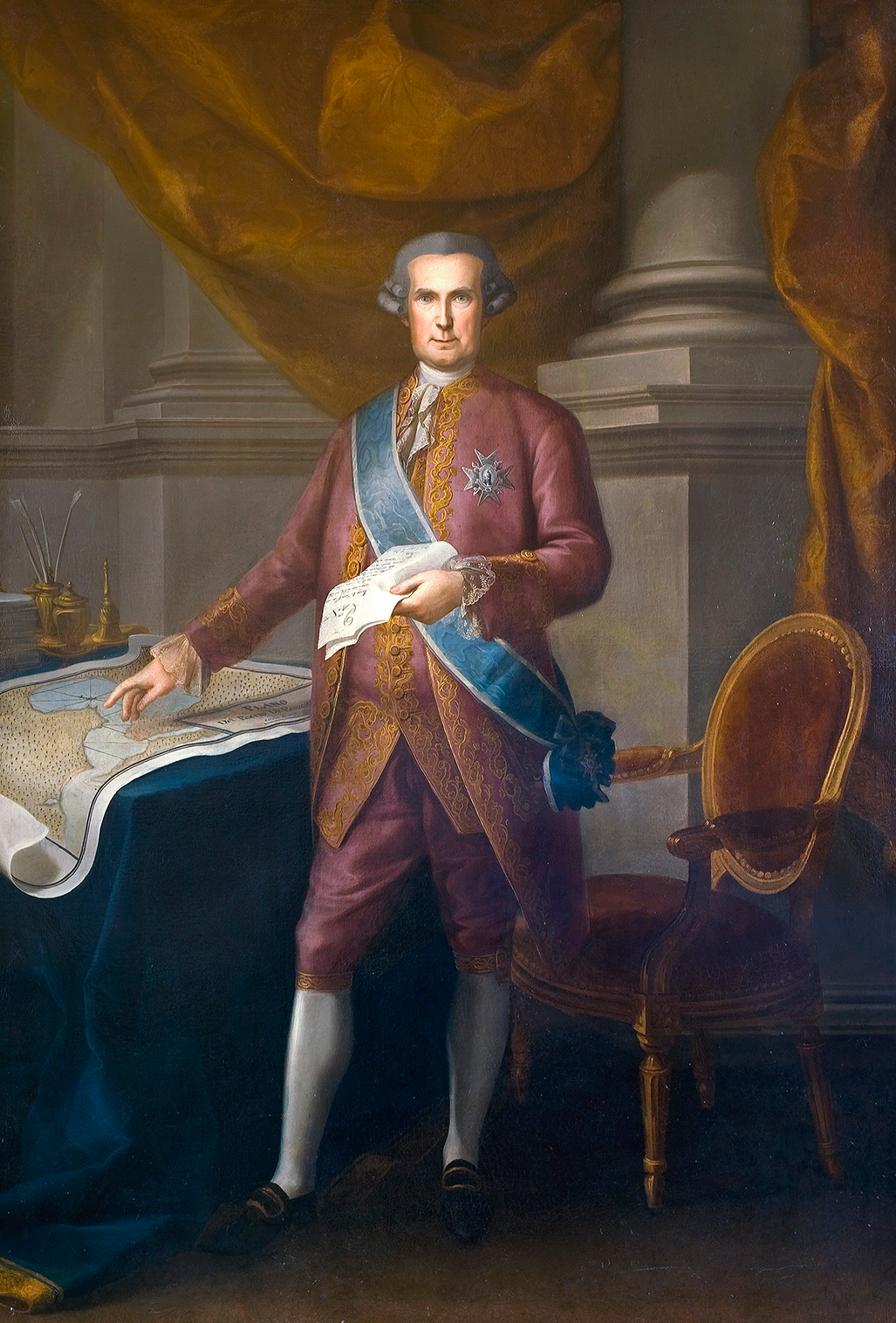
José de Gálvez, Visitador general in New Spain and later Minister of the Indies.

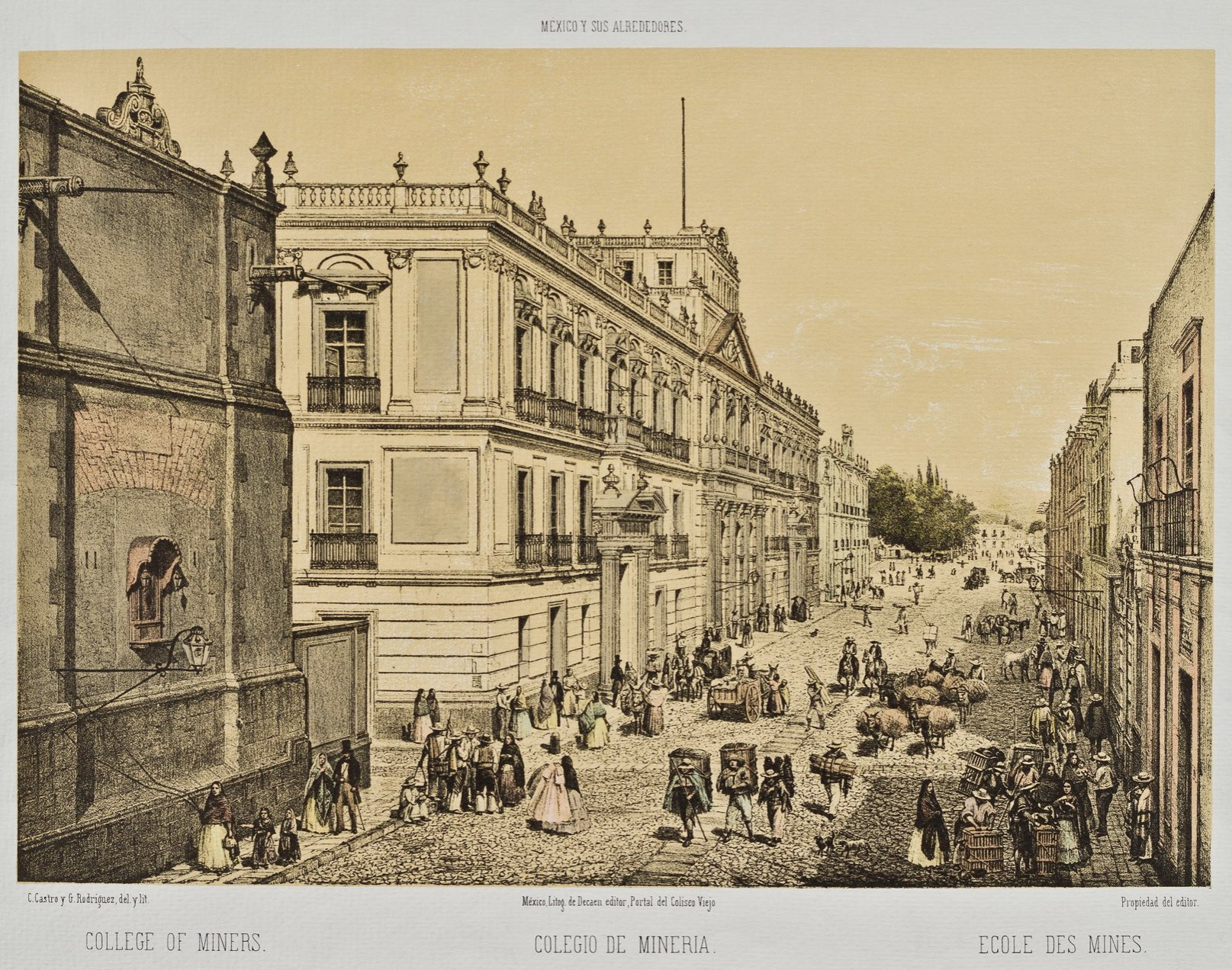
Palacio de Minería, Mexico City. The crown sought to make silver mining more productive and the silver magnates ennobled; it created the College of Mines and the Royal Mining Court

In Spanish America, José del Campillo y Cosío's Nuevo Sistema de gobierno económico para la América (New System of Economic Government for America) (1743) was a key text that shaped the reforms. He compared the colonial systems of Britain and France to that of Spain, as the first two nations reaped far greater benefits from their colonies than the Spanish. He advocated reforming Spain's economic relations with its overseas territories to a system more like the mercantilism of France's Jean-Baptiste Colbert (1619–1683).

The Bourbon Reforms have been termed "a revolution in government" for their sweeping changes to the structure of the administration, which sought to strengthen the power of the Spanish state, decrease the power of local elites in favor of office holders from the Iberian peninsula, and increase revenues for the crown.

=== Government ===
The bulk of the changes in Spanish America came in the second half of the 18th century following the visita general (general inspection) of New Spain (1765–1771) by José de Gálvez, who was later named Minister of the Indies. Upon his inspection, he found the viceroyalty in a shambles and then reorganized the tax collection system, rewarded loyal Spanish merchants, jailed corrupt tax collectors, and steered the local economy towards mining. The reforms attempted in New Spain were implemented elsewhere in Spanish America subsequently. There had been one earlier reform in the creation of the new Viceroyalty of New Granada (1717), carved out from the Viceroyalty of Peru to improve the administration of the overseas possessions. The new viceroyalty was created initially in 1717, suppressed just six years later, and then permanently established in 1739, still earlier than the reforms of the late 18th century. It was an administrative change that reflected the recognition (as early as the 16th century) that the northern area of South America had certain challenges of distance from Peru. (Note: For example, Amazonas is named after the Amazon River, and was formerly part of the Spanish Viceroyalty of Peru, a region called Spanish Guyana. It was settled by the Portuguese in the early 18th century and incorporated into the Portuguese Empire after the Treaty of Madrid (13 January 1750).) There had been earlier creations of captaincies general in Guatemala and Venezuela, marking an increase in their importance. The addition of the viceroyalties in order to compensate for challenges of distance between northern South America and Peru also came about as a result of the need to protect the vital trade routes that existed between these regions. In 1776, a second jurisdiction, the Viceroyalty of Rio de la Plata was also carved out of the Viceroyalty of Peru in 1776 as part of José de Gálvez's comprehensive administrative reform. In the same year, an autonomous captaincy general was also established in Venezuela. Even after his time in the colonies, José de Gálvez joined the Council of the Indies and eventually rose to the top of that, effectively becoming the most influential figure in the legislation of colonial Americas.

Establishment of new viceroyalties also revealed a new revelation on the part of the Spanish crown: that there were huge circuits of illicit trade in Spanish America, and that it was in the best interest of the crown to incorporate these circuits of trade into the existing infrastructure. This way, the crown was able to collect tax revenues from those circuits of trade that had previously eluded it. Although some analyze the Bourbon Reforms by arguing that the purpose of the reform was to eliminate contraband trade and other illicit circuits of trade, a closer analysis of the material evidence available indicates that many of these circuits did not disappear, but were simply incorporated.

Additionally, in the wake of the implementation of comercio libre (free internal trade) by Jose de Gálvez, merchants in Spanish America petitioned the crown for new consulados. These consulados would resolve commercial disputes and develop the infrastructure of the colony. Moreover, the consulados would be in charge of trying to implement innovative economic projects. The consulados demonstrated an effort on the part of Spain that, unlike other Atlantic empires, seemed to make a real effort to integrate its American colonies as essential parts of not just Spain's colonial empire, but also as provinces of the monarchy and not simply faraway lands. Just as in many of the other changes made by the crown, the consulados also functioned to shift power away from the creole elite and into the hands of peninsular Spaniards. As the consulados controlled internal economic circuits, when the Creoles lost control of these roles in government they also lost much of their control of trade and economic systems, further destabilizing their established power in the colonies.

Another part of the Bourbon Reforms targeted the set-up of the municipio itself. Specifically, the main plaza was a central figure in Hispanic colonial urbanism. In Spanish America, cities were planned around a central public square, and much of colonial life emanated from or was planned around that center. During the period of the Bourbon Reforms, the Spanish crown wanted to switch from the Plaza Mayor model, in which the plaza was a central square that was a daily market and a space for public festivities, to the Plaza de Armas model, in which the plaza space would be cleared and devoted to martial activities. These reforms were characterized by a mixture of construction projects, relocations, and unfinished or unsuccessful projects. Although they were only partially applied, some aspects of these reform projects actually spilled over from colonial to republican times, post- independence. In fact, in both Mexico and Peru, the independent regimes assumed features of the Bourbon reform program in terms of the use and understanding of the plaza.

Under Charles III, colonial matters were concentrated in a single ministry, which took powers away from the Council of the Indies. Furthermore, the advances Americans (Criollos) had made in the local bureaucracy in the past century and a half, usually through the sale of offices, were checked by the direct appointment of (supposedly more qualified and disinterested) Spanish officials.

Charles III and Charles IV also reversed the advances that Criollos had made in the high courts (audiencias). Under the Habsburgs, the Crown had sold audiencia positions to Criollos. The Bourbon kings ended this policy. By 1807, "only twelve out of ninety-nine [audiencia] judges were creoles."

=== Trade and the economy ===
The War of the Spanish Succession was to a large extent fought over control of Atlantic trade. In 1713, the war ended with the Peace of Utrecht which had significant impact on Spain's economic holdings. Spain lost some of its primary European possessions to the Austrian Habsburgs in addition to losing other territories such as the fortress of Sacramento, which brought the Portuguese in close proximity to Buenos Aires. In addition to its lost territory, Spain granted the Asiento de Negros to Great Britain. Granting the Asiento de Negros not only led to a significant loss of revenue for the Spanish Crown, but also provided channels through which British merchants could engage in illicit trade with Spanish America, whose inhabitants were often opposed to Spain's restrictive mercantilist policies. With these losses, Spain relied primarily on its American colonies to maintain its position as a European power.

The Bourbon Reforms transitioned Spain's economic policy to be increasingly mercantilist, an economic policy in which countries maximize their exports and minimize their imports to secure greater portion of wealth from a fixed amount in the world. This wealth was measured in the quantity that ended up in imperial treasuries.

An important goal of the Bourbon Reforms was to increase legal, registered trade with Spanish America in order to collect more tax revenue for the Crown, an aim that was frequently undercut both by the prevalence of contraband and the increasing presence of foreign merchants. One strategy to diminish this trade in contraband was the relocation in 1717 of the Casa de Contratación. This was the House of Trade which oversaw Spanish trade with its colonies, and was moved from Seville, where traders frequently dealt in contraband, to Cádiz. However, this effort did not prove highly effective, as the trade of contraband simply moved with the Casa de la Contratación to Cádiz.

Then in 1778, the Free Trade Decree (Reglamento para el comercio libre) was passed. The crown believed that free and protected trade between Spain and the Americas was the best way to restore all sectors of the Spanish dominion to their former glory. Traditionally, many identify this act and this principle to be one of the cornerstone principles of the Bourbon Reforms. The Free Trade decree opened all ports in the colonies to trade with Spanish controlled ports, the colonies, or Spain. This act, in tandem with the crucial decision preceding it to open the islands of the Spanish Caribbean to all nine peninsular Spanish ports in 1765, helped establish the notion that the special privilege of trade that only a few ports had enjoyed earlier was to be no more. It is important to understand that the ‘free’ trade that was established by the Free Trade Decree was only free in a limited sense. There were geographic limitations both in Spain and in the Americas, most notably being the exclusion of Venezuela and New Spain.

A key reason for freeing trade was that King Charles III wanted to remove the monopoly of Cádiz, a Spanish port, over trade with the Americas. Cádiz could not supply for the large demand in the Americas. He also wanted to end the Spanish Crown's financial dependence on this monopoly. Free trade was largely supported, notably by important ministers like Gálvez, a Spanish Visitador general, who argued for more commercial deregulation and the end of the monopoly of Cádiz in his paper entitled "Discurso y reflexiones de un vasallo sobre la decadencia de nuestras Indias españoles". Another supporter of free trade was Leopoldo de Gregorio, 1st Marquess of Esquilache's commercial policy commission, which on February 14, 1765, submitted a report advocating imperial free trade to replace the Cádiz monopoly.

Another goal was to more efficiently extract raw materials from Spanish America and create a captive Spanish American market for Spanish goods. The Bourbons, with the help of administrator José Patiño, implemented several new strategies aimed at streamlining the production and importation of Spanish American goods to Spain. One such strategy that proved highly profitable was the establishment of royal monopolies and trading companies as early as 1717 that controlled the production of export crops such as tobacco and sugar in Cuba and cacao in Venezuela. By charging higher prices for Spanish imports and paying lower prices for exports from Spanish America, these companies used their monopolies to generate rents that disproportionately benefited the Spanish mainland over its Spanish American colonies. For example, during the 1750s, the royal monopoly on Cuban tobacco generated a profit of more than 500 million pesos.

One of the testing grounds for this reformation of trade was in Venezuela. Starting in the 1730s, the monopoly on Venezuelan trade was held by the Royal Guipuzcoan Company of Caracas. Frustrations with this company's monopoly were felt among the majority of Venezuela's population and culminated in a revolt against the company in 1749, led by Juan Francisco de León. The revolt created a temporary alliance between elite creoles, Canarians, pardos, natives, and free blacks. While these efforts were quickly extinguished by Spanish forces, the Bourbons did put limits on the power of the Guipuzcoana company following the revolt. However, these limits primarily benefited the Mantuano elites who were creoles that profited highly from the cacao trade.

In addition to changes to production, the nature of trade under the Bourbons, especially after 1740, also shifted – away from the Habsburg fleet system for shipping, which had many inefficiencies and was vulnerable to attack, and towards a single-ship system, which was more competitive with foreign merchants and opened up more Spanish American ports to transatlantic trade.

Tobacco proved to be a successful crop after state monopolies were expanded. Also, many of the colonies began to produce an abundance of resources, which became increasingly important to other European colonial powers along with the Thirteen Colonies and British West Indies despite the fact that most of this trade was considered contraband since it was not carried on Spanish ships. Most of the Bourbon kings tried to outlaw this trade through various programs like increasing the customs receipts, with little avail.

An examination of Bourbon intervention in the Peruvian tobacco industry from the mid-18th century to the beginning of the 19th century helps reveal a little more about the nature of the Bourbon administration and its relationship to monopoly policies. Although it is widely accepted that Bourbon officials were effective in the extraction of rents, these conclusions are largely based analysis of fiscal results without a direct connection drawn between monopoly policies and the outcomes of those policies. The overall evolution of monopoly policies suggests that the Bourbons were, in fact, quite aware of organizational problems that plague hierarchies, and that they had a solid understanding of the importance of transaction costs for the sustenance of bureaucracy. This is evidenced in the design of the factory system, which helped vertically integrate much of the market and also helped reduce costs associated with controlling illegal markets. The closing of tobacco factories and similarly perceived ‘failures’ at the end of the 18th century should be read with an understanding of the limitations of the political economy of colonialism and in light of policy changes in Madrid that happened in the context of a tumultuous Europe. Monopoly policies were relaxed in areas where the most conflict arose in response to such policies.

Merchants in Cadiz benefited enormously as a result of these changes. Much wealth accumulated in the hands of the already wealthy peninsular Spaniards. Creole merchants, on the other hand, saw much of their profit decrease with the demolition of monopolies. However, these criollo merchants did not necessarily lose out. Many of them simply shifted their investments to mining, especially in New Spain.

Within New Spain, economic reforms aimed to not just increase revenue, but also to make the Crown essential in the local economy. José de Gálvez, the visitador generál in New Spain and later Minister of the Indies, implemented labor regulation through his "Regulation on Wage and Peonage" (1769). This decree specified wages for free labor workers and set conditions for contract fulfillment and circumstances such as debt repayment. Under the Bourbons, the further systematization of wages impacted the lower economic classes directly and created the organization within society that the Spanish needed for greater economic success and control.

=== Buenos Aires ===
Buenos Aires provided the perfect opportunity to integrate the products of the New World into peninsular Spain. The port city was essential to the process of extraction due to its proximity to the mining empire that was Potosí. Silver would be easily dispatched to the peninsula. Buenos Aires was not solely a beneficial port for the Spanish as it was often the center of illicit contraband along the Atlantic. Buenos Aires housed Jesuits seeking travel to Cordoba or Paraguay and the port could also be described as a "back-door" to the Andes. Regardless of Buenos Aires having a positive correlation with the Bourbon Reforms due its heavy reliance on the flow of silver and Spain's commerce, its reign eventually fell victim to Spain's peninsular conflicts, particularly France.

==== Taxation ====
Cartographical pushes resulted in massive output with extremely specific indications on maps in a manner that was extremely modern. In tandem with this were data-gathering expeditions that were sponsored and sent out to develop a deeper understanding of the colonies. Quantitative and qualitative data were gathered so that systems of taxation could be modified to maximize tax revenue for the crown.

Moreover, the practice of tax-farming ended. Prior to the Bourbon Reforms, the practice of tax-farming allowed people, specifically members of the Creole elite, to purchase the right of tax collection from the crown. These people would then pay the crown ahead of time what the expected tax revenue would be, and then they collect taxes themselves afterwards. However, with the elimination of this practice and the transition to direct tax collection, tax rates were thus higher and were also now set at an nonnegotiable and inflexible rate. Changes like this were part and parcel of the move on behalf of the Crown to try to regain control of administrative power in the American colonies. Administrative powers had, in the mind of the Crown, previously been too porous for Creoles via mechanisms such as the sale of office and tax-farming. However, as Bourbon Reforms were put into effect, many colonial officials were condemned for corrupt practices, such as taking bribes and neglecting tax collection without considering the Crown's interest.

With regards to the economy, collection of taxes was more efficient under the intendancy system. In 1778, Charles III established the "Decree of Free Trade," which allowed the Spanish American ports to trade directly with one another and most ports in Spain. Therefore, "commerce would no longer be restricted to four colonial ports (Veracruz, Cartagena, Lima/Callao, and Panama)." Tax reductions were given to the silver mining industry as part of the Crown's attempts to stimulate silver production, which had plummeted throughout Spanish America at the beginning of the 1700s. Spain relied heavily on the silver industry for tax revenue, particularly on the mines at Potosí in the Andes. In 1736, the Crown reduced the tax on silver from one-fifth to one-tenth in order to encourage silver production to be reported. Over the course of the 18th century, the market for silver led the port city of Buenos Aires to prominence, and between 1776 and 1783, 80% of the exports leaving the port at Buenos Aires were shipments of silver.

Charles III also initiated the difficult process of changing the complex administrative system practiced under the former ruling family, the House of Habsburg. Corregidores were to be replaced with a French institution, the intendant. The intendancies had the intended effect of further decentralizing the administration at the expense of viceroys, captains general and governors, since intendants were directly responsible to the Crown and were granted large powers in economic and political matters. The intendancy system proved to be efficient in most areas and led to an increase in revenue collection. Intendency seats were mainly based in large cities and successful mining centers. Almost all of the new intendants were Peninsulares, people who were born in Spain, exacerbating the conflict between Peninsulares and Criollos, who wished to retain some control of local administration. The installation of the intendancy system contributed to the further marginalization of the creole elite. It changed the question of who would occupy the positions of Crown officials and shifted the center of influence from landed Creole elites to peninsular Spaniards. Creoles were largely pushed out in favor of peninsular administrators.

The intendancy system was part of the new attitude on the part of the Bourbons to push the economic development of the mother country. The intendants were meant to be promoters of export-oriented economic activity. They were meant to focus on extractive activities, and not manufacturing ones.

=== Cartography ===
The Bourbons launched large projects of information gathering to investigate and record the natural endowments in their American colonies to enable more efficient exploitation of their colonies’ resources. These projects included censuses and large cartographical efforts. Various types of detailed maps were created to display terrain, mineral deposits, bridges and canals, forts, and other important features like mines. Mine-based maps and plans showed plans of mining towns and technical drawings of equipment like winches and ovens which were used in mine production. These maps were used to help the Bourbons fulfil their other reform goals, such as revitalizing old mines and creating new ones. They also used these maps to be able to levy more efficient taxes upon their colonies based on what they consumed and produced in abundance.

=== Agriculture ===
In terms of agriculture, the Bourbons established state monopolies over crops and established state monopoly over purchases, too. They specifically focused on commercial export crops like sugar, indigo, cochineal, tobacco, and cacao. The State was the one in charge of taking primary products and transforming them into consumable final products. Through this entire process, the crown was focused on capturing tax revenue. Additionally, Spanish merchants were pushed upwards as a result of these changes. This shift to a focus on export crops and commercial agriculture further altered and limited the autonomy and functionality of the colonies, as they became resources in a system of direct extraction for the Spanish Empire. This boosted a need for trade between Spain and the colonies as they exported raw goods and needed to receive back the processed and manufactured resources of Spain.

=== Military ===
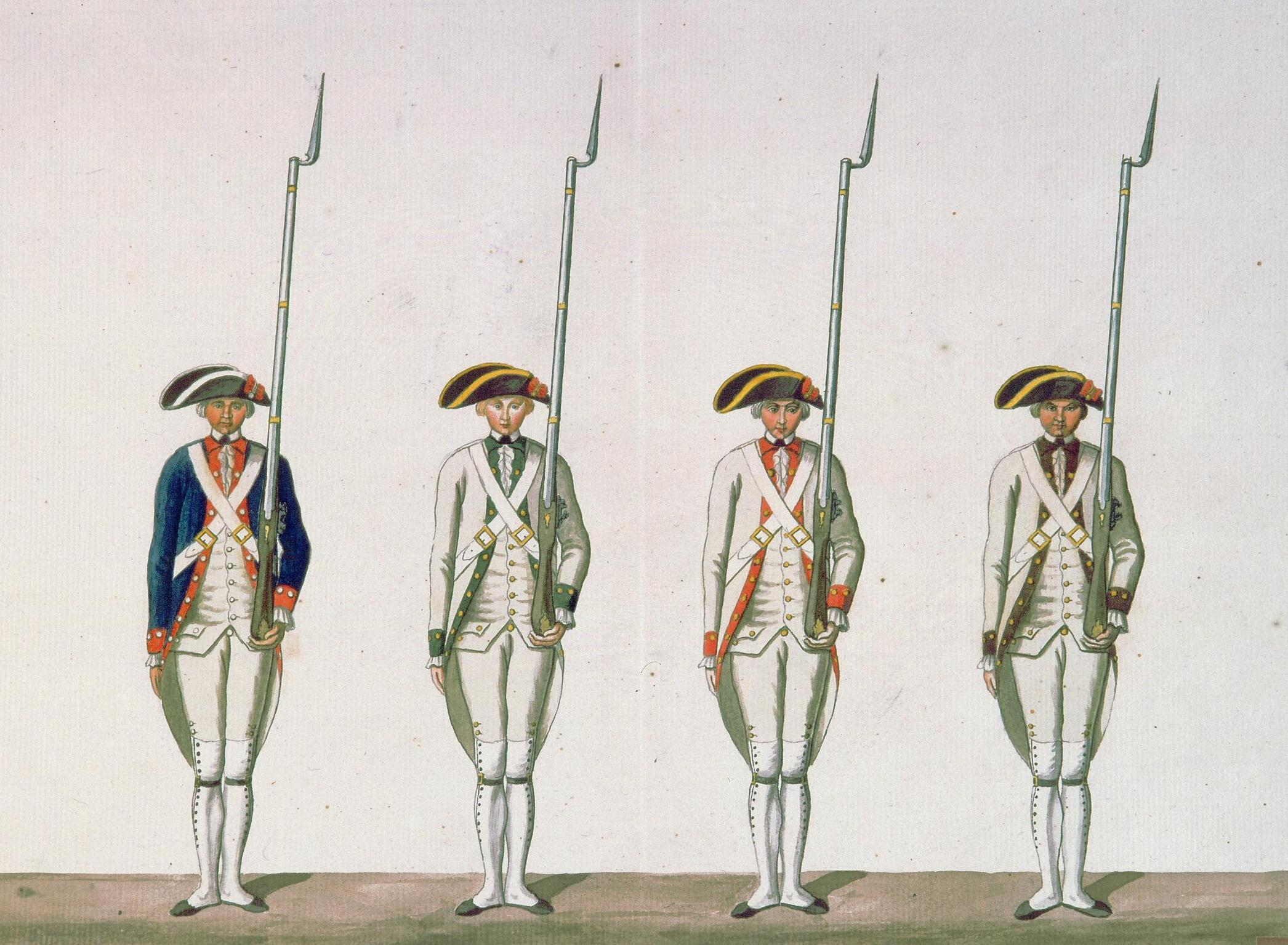
Uniforms of four line infantry regiments raised in New Spain due to the Bourbon Reforms in 1788

The Bourbon Reforms brought a different stratagem to military organization in Spanish America. There, reforms focused on a strong relationship with the cabildos, and compositions of councils chosen by the wealthy creoles. Due to a fear amongst the Bourbons of a potential penetration of their empire by other European empires, they engaged in the construction of fortresses and garrisons and created and heavily promoted militias composed of people of a variety of backgrounds and races to supplement their army. The military was a place where creoles still enjoyed a political space within the Bourbon Reforms.

The Bourbons encouraged the creation of militia under Creole control. The Creoles were also tasked with founding municipalities and collecting revenue in order to support their militias and build fortifications. Shortly, the militias soon became significantly larger and more powerful than the standing Spanish Army. In New Spain alone, there was 6,000 Spanish soldiers to 23,000 militia. Some believe that militias were often created along race lines, with militias for whites, blacks and mixed race people. However, other studies indicate that the men in militias were from all races, most of them being mixed-race.

These militias aided the supplement of a standing Spanish army, which, at the time, was occupied with conflicts on the home front. Eventually, the militias formed the base for independent armies, and turned on the Spanish. Outnumbered and already indulged in conflict abroad, Spain was put in a difficult situation that they created themselves. However, this begs a crucial thought; was the Spanish crown foolish to encourage the creation of these militias? While on the surface this seemed to be a failure from the beginning, the reality was Spain did not have much of a choice but to trust the Creoles. The reality was the Spanish Empire was tied down in too many places, and naturally they ran out of resources.

The Seven Years' War led to the formation of a secret commission in Madrid to discuss and implement military reforms. Its members decided to strengthen the colonies' fortifications, reinforce colonial forces with metropolitan troops and raise new colonial units to avoid colonies having to rely on reinforcements from Spain during emergencies. They also decided that colonial artillery units should be integrated into the metropolitan Royal Artillery Corps and colonial militias should be reformed and expanded. The garrisons of the presidios in the Provincias Internas were expanded from 734 men in 1729 to 2,187 in 1777 and 3,087 in 1787. The presidios and the patrols which travelled between them were not intended to provide a concrete line of protection or eradicate threat to News Spain but to create a general sense of control as there were troops further south for such purposes. The garrisons performed well and managed to maintain a relative atmosphere of safety in northern New Spain.

In 1768, Spanish infantry regiments were reorganized to consist of nine companies of 80 fusiliers and one company of 76 grenadiers for a total of 796 men. Havana was heavily fortified, with a new infantry regiment being raised in the city and metropolitan ones being rotated through it. Two regiments were stationed in the city at all times, with a third occasionally being present as well. Reforms were made to Cuba's militia on the pattern introduced by Alejandro O'Reilly whilst he was in Havana and expanded upon by the Spanish government. It stipulated the militia to consist of men between the ages of 16 and 45 and use conscription if there were a lack of volunteers. Its officer corps was to be drawn from the colonial upper class with regular army officers being seconded to train the militia, which was to muster frequently for training. Militiamen were to engage in peacetime active service if ordered. This system was also implemented in Louisiana, Puerto Rico and Florida. By 1784, New Spain's militia had grown to 18,000 well-organised men with an additional 15,000 less-organised militiamen with hundreds more in the Provincias Internas. In the Captaincy General of Guatemala, there were an additional 21,136 militiamen.

=== Mining ===
The location of major 18th century Spanish silver mine districts (crossed pickaxes) and the mines involved in mercury supply needed for silver mining (purple dots).

The Bourbons implemented a range of mining reforms to reverse the decline of mines in New Spain and in accordance with the Bourbon's goals to increase the wealth of Spain. The mines had been declining due to technological issues and high costs: as tunnels deepened, flooding became easier and it became more expensive and time-consuming to extract mineral ores. Therefore, the Spanish Crown attempted to revitalize the mines and create new ones through a series of reforms. These included giving the mine owners control over labor costs through lower salaries, lowering the prices of gunpowder and organizing its supply more efficiently, as well as a steadier and cheaper supply of mercury which was used for refining silver ores. The reforms also gave tax exemptions to mine production. In 1787, mining ordinances of New Spain and the Tribunal de Minería in Lima were created, to handle and make more efficient mining production. In 1792, the Tribunal opened a new mining school, the Royal Mining Seminary, with limited success.

There was much growth in mine production under the Bourbons, with silver output increasing by over 15 million Pesos in Mexico alone. Some historians attribute this growth to the Bourbon Reforms, whereas others attribute it more to the rising investments of entrepreneurs into mining during this period. For example, regarding Zacatecas, a mining region with huge turnover in mining production, historian Enrique Tandeter argues that "There the rise of the first quarter of the century can be attributed to individual entrepreneurs." Entrepreneurial investments allowed for improvements in mining technology and lower costs. However, at the mercury mine of Santa Bárbara de Huancavelica, Peru, it has been suggested that the reforms were behind the mining disaster of 1786 that killed over 100 persons and greatly reduced the mine's output. Administrative reforms eliminating the miner's guild role in governance in the mine removed traditional checks and balances at the same time output was required to increase. The reforms also initiated a period of high overturn of mine managers. Albeit production in Huancavelica was already in decline at the time, the collapse made the mines in Spanish America rely increasingly on quicksilver imported from Almadén in Spain.

The city of Potosí saw increases in silver production. Mita was still in place, but through purchasing the rights of mita from miners who had been given mita quotas and incorporating themselves into the infrastructure of forcible sale of goods to the indigenous, merchants were still able to participate in mining. These merchants were income-pursuing more than they were profit-pursuing when purchasing the rights of mita, while also seeking profit in the forcible sale of goods to the indigenous. However, to clarify, ‘forcible sale’ is a phrase that ought to be read with caution. The evidence indicates that there were indigenous peoples who would participate in the purchase of goods from these merchants willingly, and that mules used in mule trains helped to facilitate their own internal economy.

=== The Catholic Church ===
The Catholic Church played a major role in the Bourbon Reforms, specifically in the viceroyalties. The Catholic Church was the official state religion among the vice royalties of Spanish America, and the new colonies brought forth an opportunity to spread Catholicism.

The Catholic Church arrived in America with the Conquistadors. Many missionaries came to the Americas for a fresh, new environment for Christianity to thrive. As in Spain itself, there was a clear alliance between the Church and the Crown in Spanish America. Ecclesiastical institutions were allotted some freedom from the Crown. The fuero eclesiástico, or clerical immunity, granted clergy members immunity from the royal courts. According to this fuero, any civil crime or criminal offense would be heard in front of the ecclesiastical instead of the royal or local court. This privilege was then extended to all clerics, nuns, priests, monks, and friars. This fuero extended to the land owned by the individuals and institutions which meant the Spanish Crown could not exercise justice physically nor collect taxes.

Missionizing in maroon societies in Spanish America became essential for the nature of politics of African resistance in the Iberian Atlantic world. Maroons were Africans who escaped from slavery in the Americas and often mixed with local indigenous people. In the sixteenth century, missionizing native peoples was seen as a moral conquest. It was used as a tool of pacification among maroons. In Ecuador, Santo Domingo, Mexico, and Panama, imprinting and "pacifying" maroon societies was very dependent on the spread of Spanish Catholicism. Pacification is an attempt to create or maintain peace through agreements and diplomacy. Christianization often conflicted with the relationships the Maroons created with Catholic clerics and created tensions. Spanish cultural hegemony functioned to imprint submission to religious practices. Maroons, as well as other Africans, rapidly learned that Catholicism was necessary for political legitimation. However, bringing Christianity to light did not interrupt the development of localized practices that observed religious traditions of Africans and indigenous Americans. Maroon communities on the coast of colonial Ecuador learned how Christianization became a tool for Afro-Amerindian rebels in Spain's empire and in the African diasporic world. "While an Afro-Christian diasporic identity may have been in its formative stage during the sixteenth century, transfers of knowledge between the old world and the new were readily apparent in European interactions with Maroons on the Esmeraldas coast. This case study of the Maroons of colonial Ecuador will allow us to see in three acts, or phases, how clerical intervention and the discourse of Christian conversion shaped colonization over time: ultimately yielding a modus vivendi between rebel African slaves and Spanish colonial authorities." (Bryant, O'Toole, Vinson, 2012: 96–97).

The reforms caused many religious tensions as well as social tensions. One of the most major modifications in the Bourbon Reforms was the expulsion of the Jesuits. The Society of Jesus, the members being the Jesuits, had become one of the most powerful organizations in the colonies at the time and had a distinct amount of power until the Bourbon Reforms. First, under the 1750 Treaty of Madrid, which orchestrated a land exchange between Spain and Portugal in South America, Spain's intention to give Portugal territory containing a total of seven Jesuit missions sparked intense Jesuit resistance, and war between Spain and Portugal broke out in 1762. In 1767, Charles III of Spain ordered the expulsion of 2,200 Jesuits from the vice royalties. Of the 2,200 that were exiled, 678 were from Mexico (New Spain) with 75% of the Jesuits from Mexico being Mexican-born.

However, the Jesuits also were more than just a missionary group. They were very influential businessmen and had control over significant portions of the American colonies. Moreover, the Jesuits were a group that emerged from the Counter-Reformation movement. They came to be functionally as soldiers of the church and therefore had a special allegiance to the papacy. Thus, it was likely in the best interest of the Crown to make sure that the people on the ground in the American colonies would have a stronger allegiance to the Crown than to any other external group.

The expulsion of the Jesuits was frowned upon among many colonists. Many historians believe that the Bourbon Reforms would bring forth self-confidence for American-born Spaniards. The expulsion of the Jesuits confronted the liberal ideology of the eighteenth century and conservative positions of the time. The expulsion represented aspects of liberal ideology as a need to break away from colonial past, progress and civilization as attainable objectives, education as a neutral term of religious instruction, and the separation of the Catholic Church and state. These factors played a major role in the modernization of Spanish America. Spanish soldiers went to Mexico and rounded up the Jesuits to be exiled to Italy. The Jesuits were then placed on Spanish warships and sent to the Italian port of Civitavecchia. Upon arrival, Pope Clement XIII refused to let the prisoners set foot on papal territory. The warships then went to the island of Corsica, but due to a rebellion on shore, it took a while to let the Jesuits onto the island. Bernardo Tanucci, adviser to Charles III, did not welcome the Jesuits into Naples and the Jesuits were threatened with death if they crossed the border of the Papal States back to Naples. Historian Charles Gibson stated that the expulsion of the Jesuits was a "sudden and devastating move" by the Spanish Crown to assert royal control.

Another historical view is that the Jesuits were expelled primarily due to the Bourbons’ need for a scapegoat, following King Charles’ failures in the Seven Years' War and due to riots in Madrid and elsewhere in Spain arising from his reforms. Charles created a commission which blamed the unrest in Madrid on the Jesuits. Along this line of reasoning, historians Kenneth Andrien and Allan Kuethe argue that "claims of a Jesuit-led conspiracy allowed the crown to find a scapegoat without confronting directly the broad array of popular and conservative political forces opposed to reform".

Emphasis on the dominant role of the state in ecclesiastical reform sometimes made the church seem defensive and resistant to change and modern ideas. Many nuns of the eighteenth century were resistant and even rebelled against the thought of the church and state joining. Many priests and nuns were hesitant to join forces with the state because they feared the state would gain too much power and try to alter the preexisting ideals and beliefs of the Catholic Church. With the formation of Spanish America, the Catholic Church and the Spanish Crown formed an alliance that lasted for centuries both in the Iberian Peninsula and Spanish America.

These changes are all part of the movement to subjugate the church to the state. Eliminating the fuero also eliminated what the Crown would have likely seen as unnecessary intermediaries, and thus, the bypassing of these intermediaries would make the state stronger. Moreover, ideologically, while these reforms were being implemented, there was a parallel movement happening in Europe to move towards a harder line of separation between Church and State. The Bourbons were, in fact, quite modern in their understanding of the separation between Church and State.

However, the relationship between the Church and the implementation of the Bourbon Reforms in Spanish America should not be treated as if it were monolithic and singular. While the above-mentioned trends can be seen when looking at the core areas of Spanish America, even at the height of the Bourbon Reforms, missionaries still played an active part in the Spanish-American colonial empire. Missionaries often were sent with presidial soldiers into the wilderness of the moving frontier as an arguably more human and, to the crown, less expensive method of converting, subjugating, and incorporating new indigenous peoples. Although the prevalence of missionary groups might have declined in most areas, there still existed a rhythmic and constantly fluctuating relationship in which missions, the military, and civil settlement in frontier society.

== Effects ==
The Bourbon Reforms succeeded in raising revenue and increasing silver production in Spanish America. While the changes in tax collection and trade policy had a significant impact on the economic success of the colonies, the domestic industries suffered under the Bourbon Reforms. Changes such as the removal of taxes on Spanish wine and the blocking of local mechanisms of production was intended to encourage the purchase of Spanish products. During this time as local production suffered, the flow of wealth increasingly moved towards the Criollo and bureaucratic elites and away from the lower classes. While in certain regions, such as Buenos Aires, the reforms led to growth and productivity, in other places, particularly in smaller towns or rural regions, the lack of presence of wealthy Criollo elites and the massive disparities in distribution of wealth led to unrest, which eventually manifested itself in complaints, and eventually riots and revolts.

There are various historical interpretations on the success of the Bourbon Reforms. Nevertheless, though the legislation passed by the Bourbons did much to reform the Empire, it was not enough to sustain it. Many of these reforms laid the groundwork of unrest that continued to develop and grow until the movements for independence. However, it is necessary to be wary of reading this history as a linear process in which the Bourbon Reforms created an unrest that just grew and grew until finally tensions finally snapped and revolts ignited through Spanish America. For example, although it is true that the militias that were created in this era eventually became the base of independence armies, it does not become a significant issue until a while later. There were a series of riots. However, they generally did not threaten the system in place, they rarely made demands, and they were usually in response to something specific.

It is important when studying the process of these reforms, particularly the economic reforms, that one pays close attention to where the money being generated is going. Much of it went to the creole elites in the cities, and to bureaucratic elites, and to the Spanish treasure in the Americas. Wealth being generated was not being redistributed to lower classes. This coupled with a general increase in regulations and obligations, especially for the indigenous, contributed to a societal foundation that was untenable for the plebeians of colonial Spanish-American society.

The tensions continued to grow and widespread discontent lead to an increasing number of revolts in the Andean region. In the middle of the 18th century, the number of insurrections rose steadily so there were a dozen or more per decade. From 1750 to 1759 there were 11 recorded, while 20 years later the decade of 1770–1779 witnessed more than 20. The following decade, the Rebellion of Túpac Amaru II drew mainly upon the frustrations of the indigenous community but also included Black slaves and Criollos. The cross-class alliance was fleeting, and the insurrection was squashed by the Spanish army. The Revolt of the Comuneros, led by a Criollo, presented demands in Bogota that would benefit the Criollos and Indians but it was not successful. The inhabitants of New Spain, especially the peasant class, experienced the oppression of Bourbons but did not turn to revolt in the same way as their southern neighbors. Rising costs of land, disease, crime and agricultural crises increased tensions in New Spain. Perhaps due to the lack of Aztec identity, the circumstances did not produce a united response like that of the Rebellion of Túpac Amaru II and Revolt of the Comuneros. While a threat, the Tupac Amaru II revolt did not intend to overthrow the Spanish crown. Tupac Amaru himself claimed to have been loyal and merely carrying out the king's will. The unrest in the late 18th century was not motivated by the prospect of independence or enlightenment thinking, and often used traditional Spanish law and Catholic theology in its justifications and reasoning. However, it is seen by some scholars as a precursor to the eventual independence of the American colonies.

Not all rebellions were violent. In Venezuela, the movement was essentially an economic protest which the government by its response turned into a rebellion; its social base was among smaller farmers and merchants, many of them criollos, and their cry was ‘long live the King and death to the Vizcayans.′ Even at its height "the rebellion remained a moderate movement, basically a peaceful protest, led by a man who in no way was in no way a revolutionary." In the end, while the leader was executed, there was limited action and the revolt reduced privileges for the Caracas company. Therefore, while some of the information in this section is essential, it is important to present the example of the Venezuelan revolt to show that not all of the revolts were bloody.

== See also ==
- Enlightenment in Spain
- Spanish American Enlightenment
- Historiography of Colonial Spanish America
- Nueva Planta decrees issued by Philip V, 1707–1716, reorganizing the royal government of Spain
