= Posada de Valdeón =

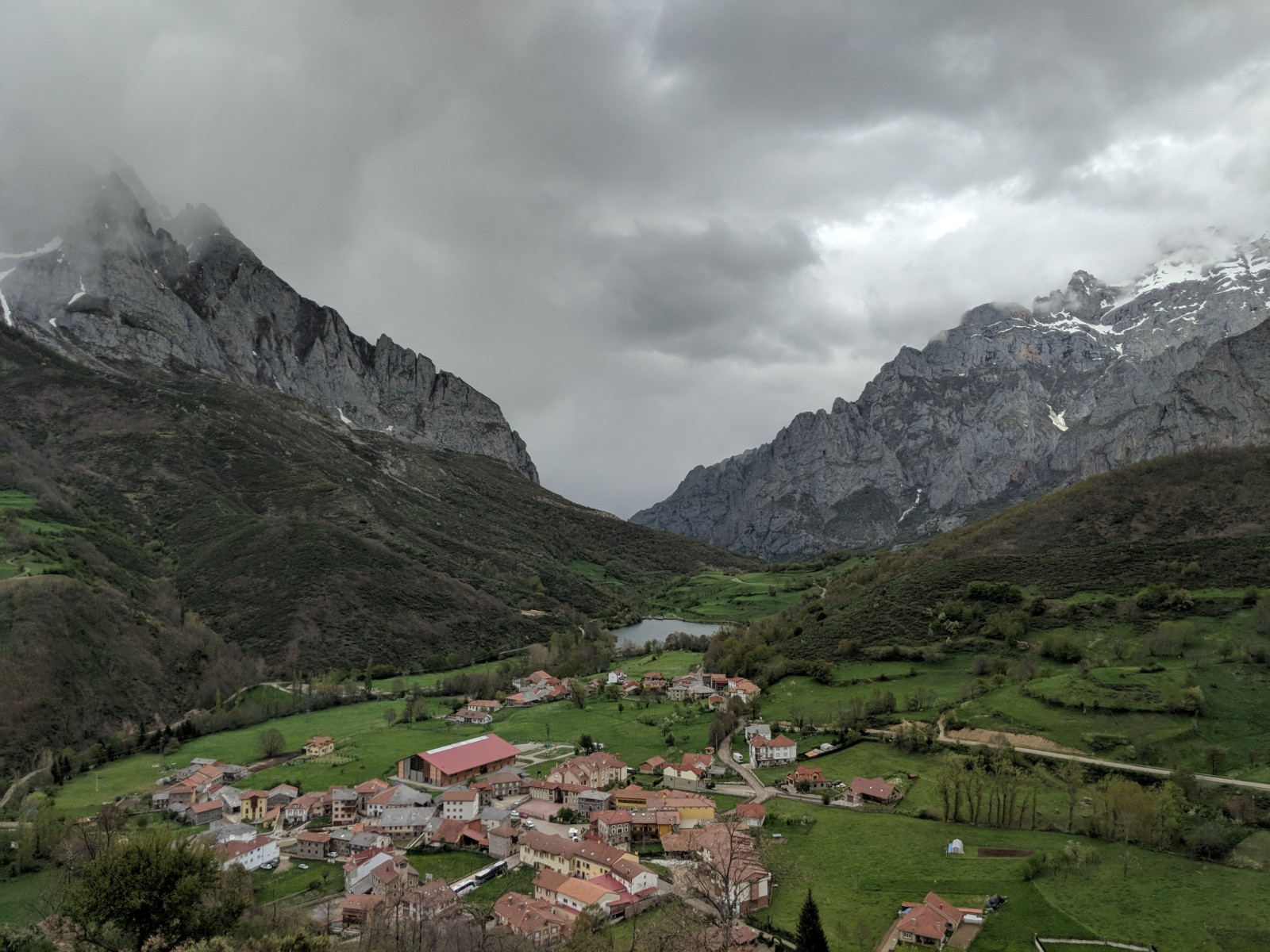

- Flag Coat of arms

- Location within Castile and León Location within Spain
- Coordinates: 43°09′N 4°56′W
- Country: Spain
- Autonomous community: Castile and León
- Province: León
- Municipality: Posada de Valdeón

Area
  - Total: 164 km^{2} (63 sq mi)

Population (2025-01-01)
  - Total: 392
  - Density: 2.39/km^{2} (6.19/sq mi)
- Time zone: UTC+1 (CET)
  - Summer (DST): UTC+2 (CEST)

Posada de Valdeón (Leonese language: Valdïón) is a municipality located in the province of León, Castile and León, Spain.

== Population ==
According to the 2025 census (INE), the municipality has a population of 392 inhabitants.

== Villages ==
Posada de Valdeón's municipality has eight villages (Popular name / Official name):

- Caín / Caín de Valdeón
- Santa Marina / Santa Marina de Valdeón
- Caldevilla / Caldevilla de Valdeón
- Cordiñanes / Cordiñanes de Valdeón
- Los Llanos / Los Llanos de Valdeón
- Posada / Posada de Valdeón
- Prada / Prada de Valdeón
- Soto / Soto de Valdeón

== Climate ==
Vega de Liordes, an enclave in the Leon sector of Picos de Europa belonging to the municipality of Posada de Valdeón registered −35.8 °C (−32.4 °F) on January 7, 2021.
