= Gustav Schulze =

Mexican-German geologist

- Born: 1881; Orizaba, Mexico
- Died: 1965 (aged 83–84)
- Scientific career
- Fields: Geology, Climbing

Gustav Schulze (1881-1965) was a Mexican-German geologist who was the first scientist to study the geology and paleontology of Picos de Europa and Cantabrian Mountains. Also was the first person who climbed Picu Urriellu alone in 1906.

== Biography ==
Schulze was born in Orizaba, Veracruz, Mexico. His father was Adolf Julius Schulze, a Bavarian merchant emigrated to Mexico and his mother was María Ziehl, a Mexican woman from a German origin family.

In 1884 the family traveled to Germany, after father's dead in Germany the family decided to established there.

He studied secondary studies in Munich, after that, he decided to study geology at Leipzig University and Munich Geological Institute. In 1905 he obtained a doctorate degree with a geological study of Allgäu Alps. Later, he obtained a German government grant to study the Picos de Europa geology to obtain his habilitation to become university teacher.

== Geological work ==
At that time Picos de Europa was almost an unknown place. There was only few information from previous studies from Guillermo Schulz and Charles Barrois. Barrois probably was the person who suggested him to study the geology of Picos. Schulze arrived to Spain for the first time in summer of 1906, and later in 1907 and 1908.

In his first visit to Spain in 1906 he began studying the coast of Llanes; after that he went to Cangas de Onís where he organized an expedition to the Picos Western Massif. Covadonga was his expedition departure point. In that year, he became the first person to climb alone Picu Urriellu, the most famous peak of Picos de Europa. That peak had been climbed for the first time two years before.

In summer of 1907 he explored Picos Eastern Massif although he had time to visit Covadonga again with Aymar de Saint-Saud. His last expedition to Picos was in 1908. He came back to Covadonga. In this last expedition he concluded that the Covadonga limestone had the same age of the limestone he found in the summits of Eastern Massif and it was among the youngest limestone of Picos.

In 1910 he returned to Mexico. The First World War caught him in Eastern Africa, where he had been joined to a failed German expedition to try to research the fossils of the Serengeti area. After war, he moved to Mexico where he worked making economic and geological studies about mining resources for several companies and Mexican government.

In 1953 he donated his Spanish fossils collection to University of Tübingen. In 1954 Schulze asked for help to the Spanish government to publish his researches about Picos de Europa and Cantabrian Range, but there was no answer from the government.

He was the first geologist who explained the geological structure of Picos de Europa, but the beginning of World War I cut his career as a scientific and university teacher in Germany. In fact, Schulze never published his discoveries. His never published manuscripts advanced in more than fifty years the current knowledge about Picos geology. He researched Cantabrian Range and Picos without preconceived ideas, which allowed him to reach correct scientific understanding of the origin and formation of these mountains.

Unfortunately, the difficulties that the two European wars of the 20th century brought to his life, and the need to work on other geological projects, denied Schulze the glory of going down in the history of geology as the greatest pioneer of the geological research of the Picos de Europa area. At least, the late discovery of his forgotten field notebooks has allowed science to be aware of the enormous importance that his studies would have had at the time and may his name be remembered for this reason.
