= Naranjo de Bulnes =

Mountain in Asturias, Spain

Coordinates: 43.2°N 4.81667°W

Picu Urriellu
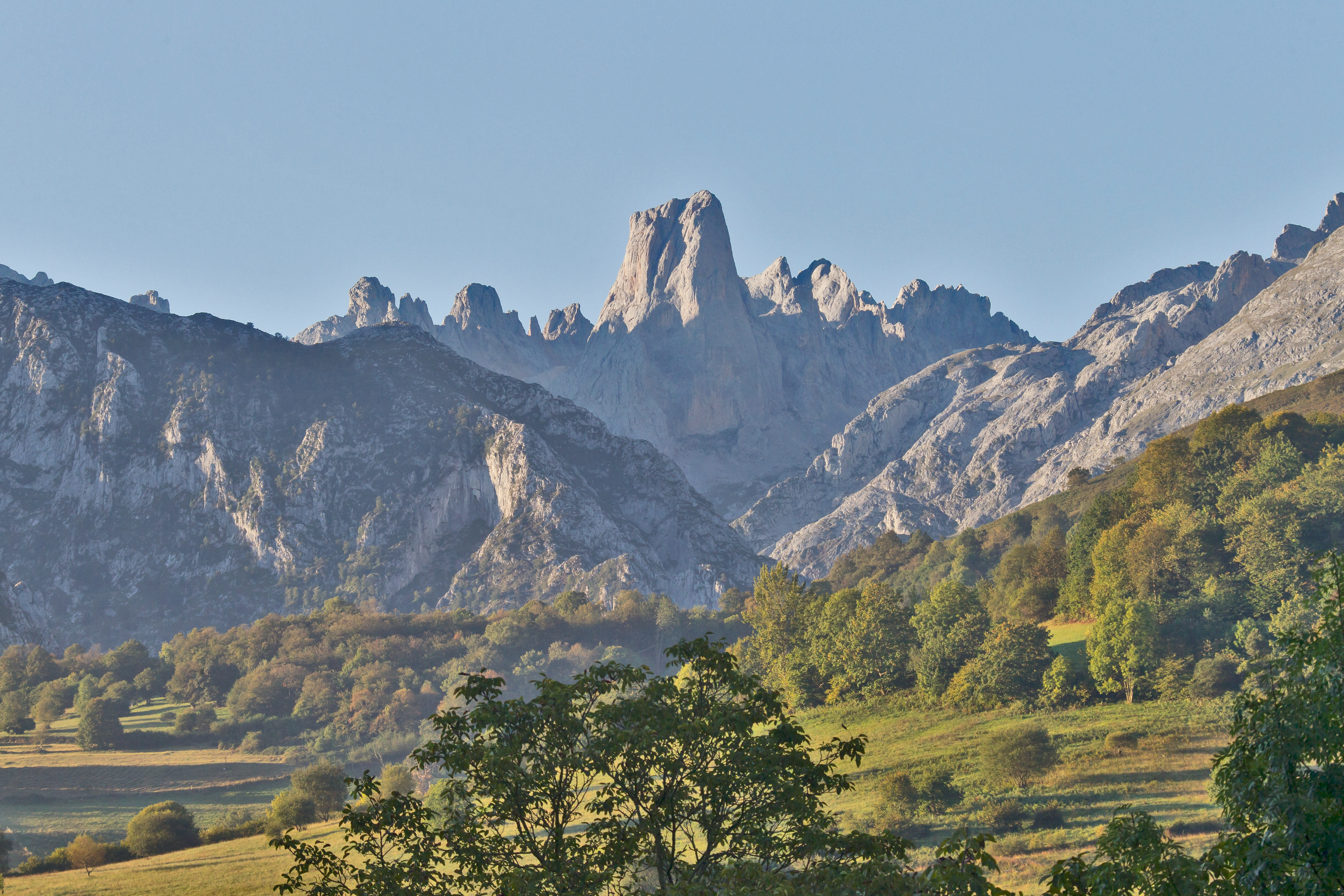
- Naranjo de Bulnes.

Highest point
- Elevation: 2,519 m (8,264 ft)
- Prominence: 500 m (1,600 ft)

Naming
- English translation: Picu Urriellu
- Language of name: Asturian

Geography
- Location: Asturias, Spain
- Parent range: Cantabrian Mountains - Picos de Europa
- Topo map: 1

Climbing
- First ascent: August 5, 1904, Pedro Pidal, 1st Marquess of Villaviciosa de Asturias
- Easiest route: from Refugio Vega d'Urriellu.

The Naranjo de Bulnes (known as Picu Urriellu in Asturian) is a limestone peak dating from the Paleozoic Era, in the Macizo Central region of the Picos de Europa, Asturias (Spain). Its name Picu Urriellu is believed to be derived from the term Los Urrieles, which is used to describe the Macizo Central. Naranjo de Bulnes is part of the Cabrales region of Asturias, and lies within the Picos de Europa National Park.

The first written reference to "Picu Urriellu" as "Naranjo de Bulnes" is credited to the German geologist and engineer Wilhelm Schulz, who, in 1855, published the first topographic and geological map of Asturias. As far as is known the etymology of this name is not clear, because, historically, the local inhabitants always referred to the mountain as "Picu Urriellu". It has been suggested that the name can be attributed to the orange hue of the limestone from which the peak is formed. The local residents of Bulnes have a saying concerning the contentious name: "No me llameis Naranjo, pues fruto no puedo dar, llamadme Picu Urriellu que es mi nombre natural." ("Don't call me Orange tree, because fruit I cannot bear, call me Picu Urriellu which is my natural name.")

It has an altitude of 2,519 metres and although it is by no means the highest peak of the Cantabrian mountain range, it can be considered the best-known summit in the world of Spanish mountaineering, especially the 550m high vertical wall of the west face for big wall climbing. At its foot lies Vega Urriellu, a glacial valley from the quaternary period.

== Historic ascents ==
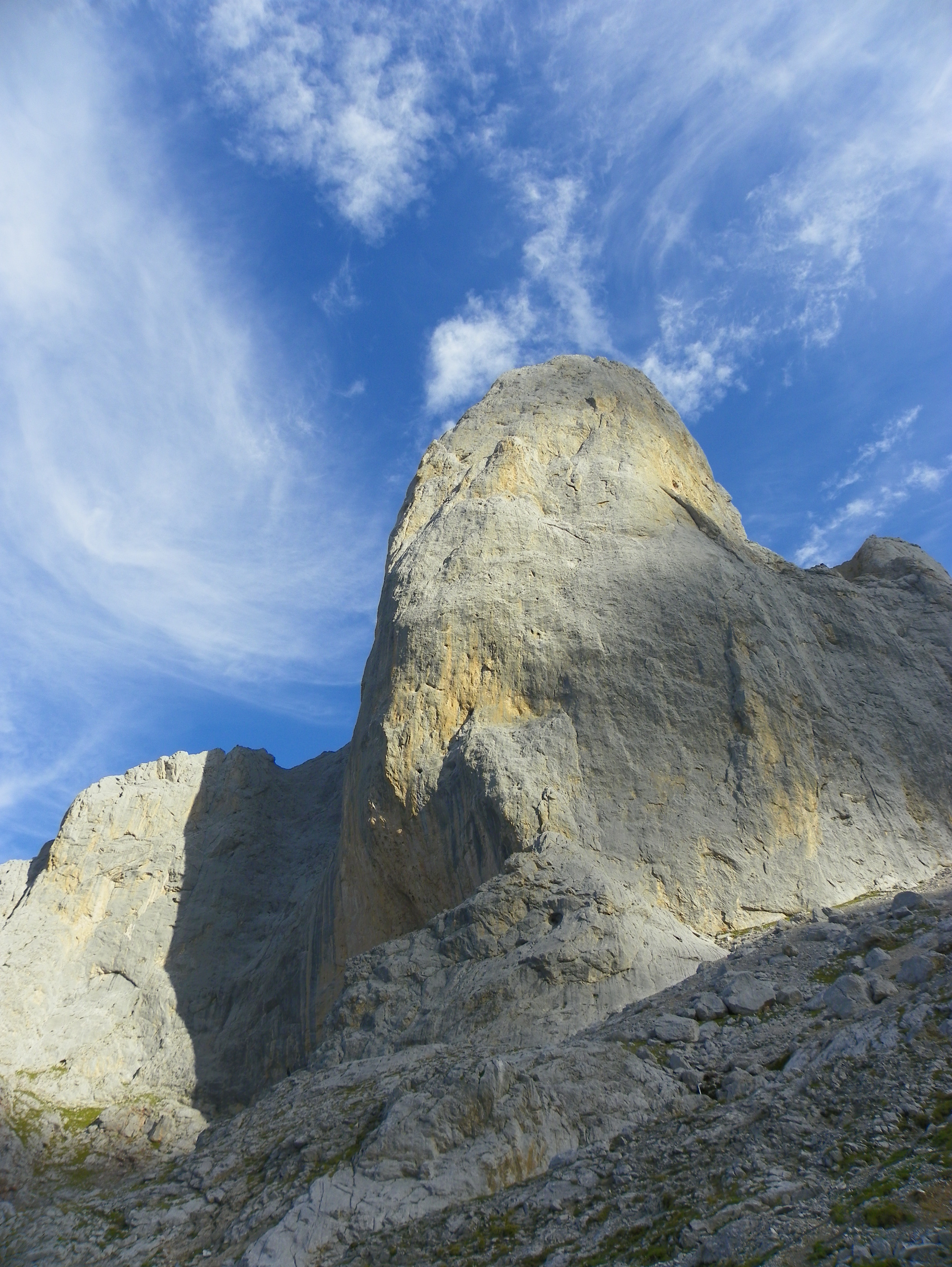
Western face of Picu Urriellu

This mountain was first scaled via the north face (by the route now known as the Vía Pidal) on 5 August 1904 by Pedro Pidal, 1st Marquess of Villaviciosa de Asturias, accompanied by the shepherd Gregorio Perez, called "El Cainejo" based on his place of birth, Caín in León.

The German geology professor and expert mountain climber Gustav Schulze made the second ascent of Urriellu on 1 October 1906, also via the north face, making him the first man to make the climb solo. He was also the first to use climbing pins to rappel down the south face. Accustomed to the large cliffs of the Alps and the Dolomites, Schulze described the climb as short and difficult.

Using the same face and route as Pidal, Victor Martínez Campillo, a local of the nearby town of Bulnes, made the ascent on 31 August 1916. On this climb, Campillo recovered parts of the rope that Pidal and Perez had left attached to the rock during their descent from the peak. He made the same climb again on 22 September 1923, and on 19 August 1924, also opened a more gentle route, to the left of the south face and now known as "Vía Victor".

On 7 July 1928, the mountaineer Andrés Espinosa from Biscay scaled the south face alone without ropes. This was only the second climb of this kind on the mountain and the first at a national standard.

One month later, on 8 August, Manuel Martinez Campillo (a cousin of Victor) opened a new path known as the Horizontal Pass. This route was created to the right of the south face and has since become one of the most used routes.

On 13 August 1944, two sons of Victor Martínez, Alfonso and Juan, opened the route on the south face known as the "Vía Sur", or the "Martínez Direct Line", which is one of the most used and safest routes.

On 23 March 1954, Antonio Moreno, Rafael Pellús, Máximo Serna and Agustín Faus from the Peñalara High Mountain Group tried to make the first winter climb. This attempt was called off because of the threat of avalanches. On 8 March 1956, Ángel Landa Bidarte from the Baracaldo Alpine tourism group and Pedro Udaondo from the Bilbao Juventus mountain group were the first to reach the summit in winter conditions.

On 21 August 1962, the Aragonese mountaineers Alberto Rabadá and Ernesto Navarro completed the first ascent via the difficult West Face.

On 8 February 1973, two parties, one formed by Miguel Ángel García Gallego (from Murcia) and José Ángel Lucas, and the other formed by César Pérez de Tudela and Pedro Antonio Ortega (from Ardilla), made the first winter climb using the "Vía Rabadá y Navarro" on the West Face. This ascent was followed closely by the media as that winter had already claimed several lives and a few spectacular rescues had been required.

On 4 September 2009, the brothers Iker and Eneko Pou conquered Urriellu in 8 hours via the Orbayu route, a path with one of the most difficult cliff faces in the world with a grade of 8c+/9a.

The "Pandébano Col" can also be reached from the town of Bulnes; however, this town can only be reached using a footpath or the funicular railway. Although the most direct way of getting to the "Vega Urriellu" from Bulnes would be along the Balcosín channel and the "Majada de Camburero", this path is more difficult.

== Climbing routes ==
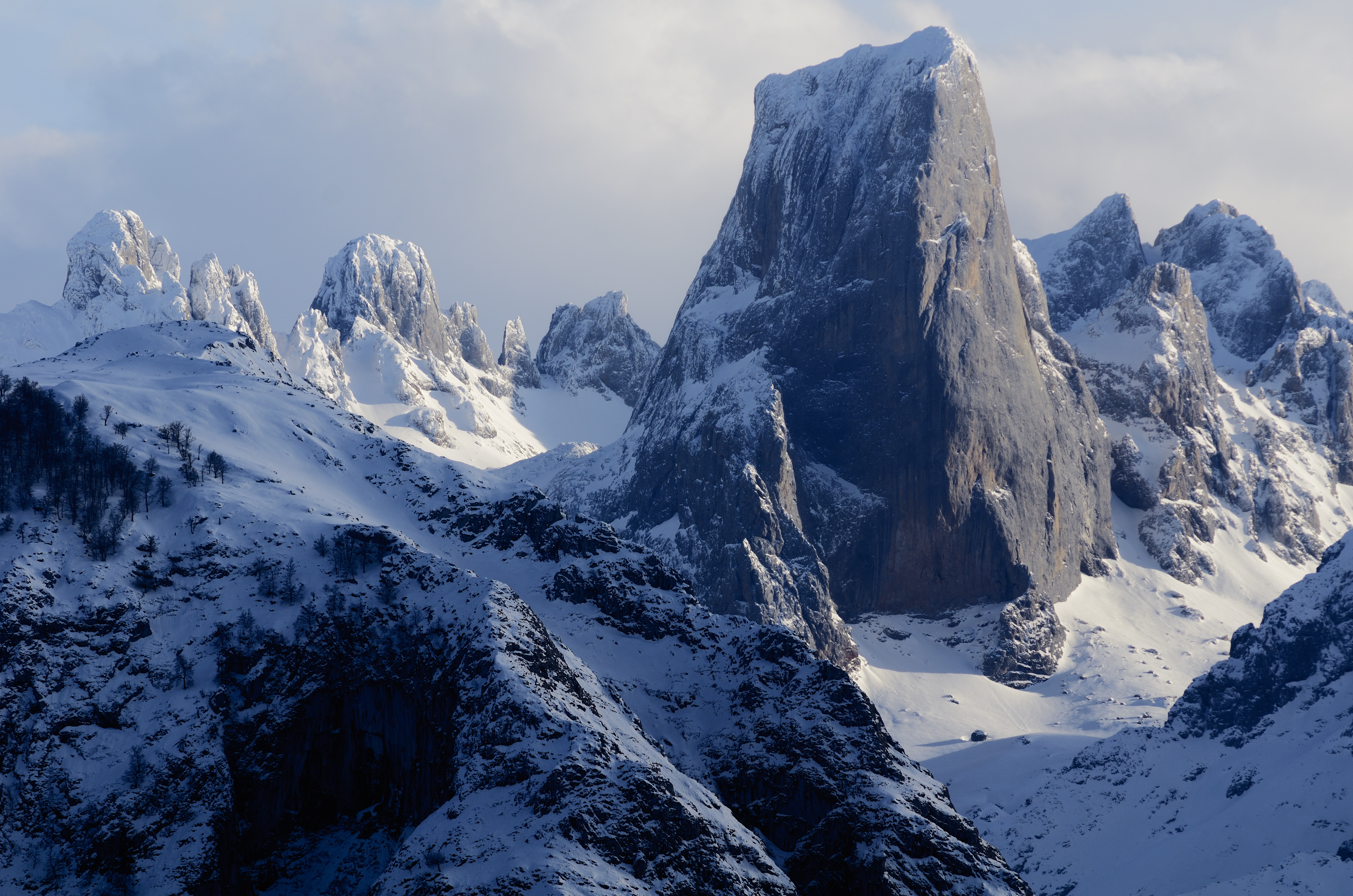
Uriellu on 3 March 2013

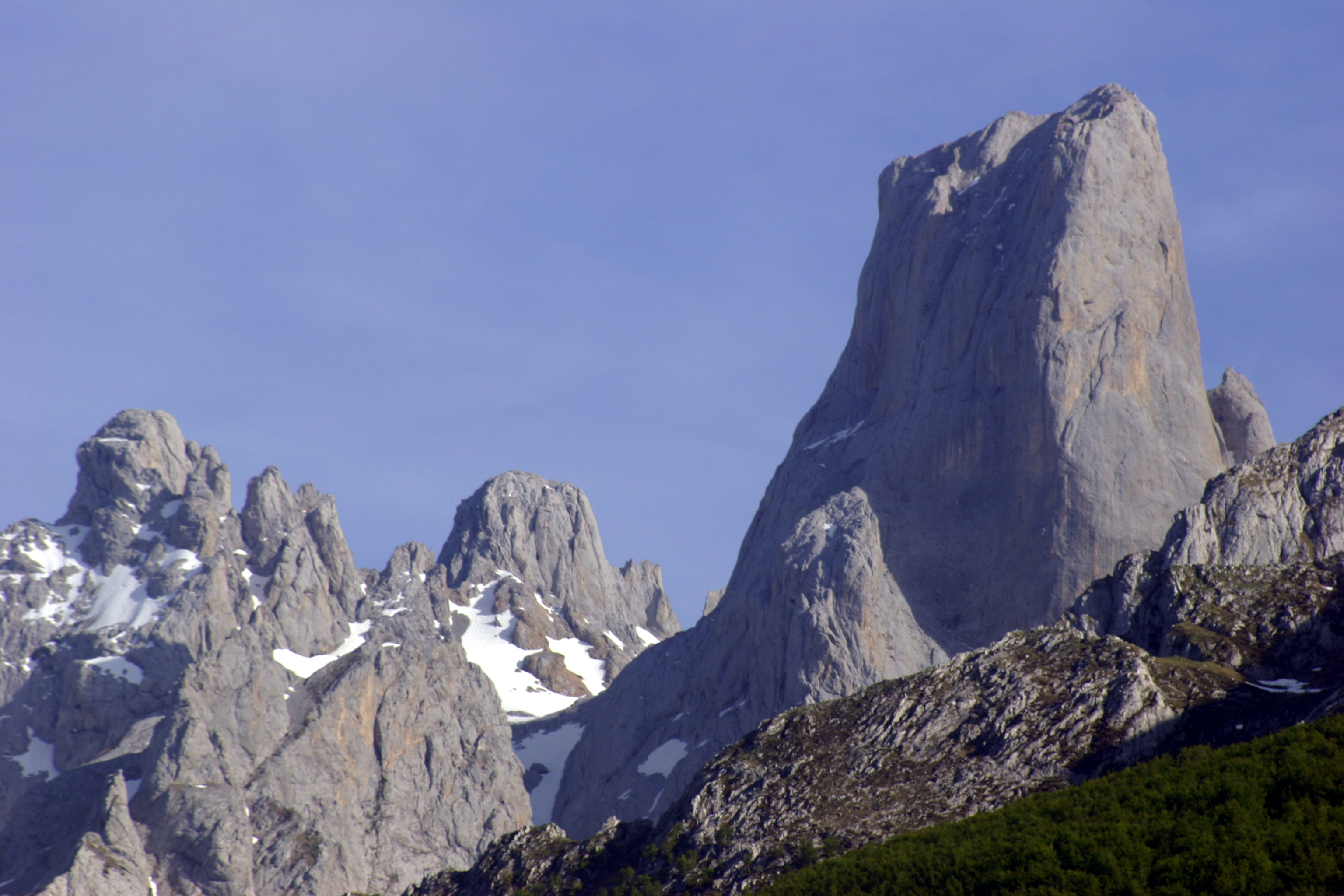
Uriellu on 24 May 2005

A list of the most important routes (most of which are for big wall climbing):

West Face

- Rabadá y Navarro (750m, MD+, 6a, A1 [6c+])
- Leiva (500m, 7a/[6b,A1])
- Sagitario (200m, 6b)
- Directísima (500m, 7b/[6a,A2])
- Murciana 78 (500m, 7c+/[6a,A2])

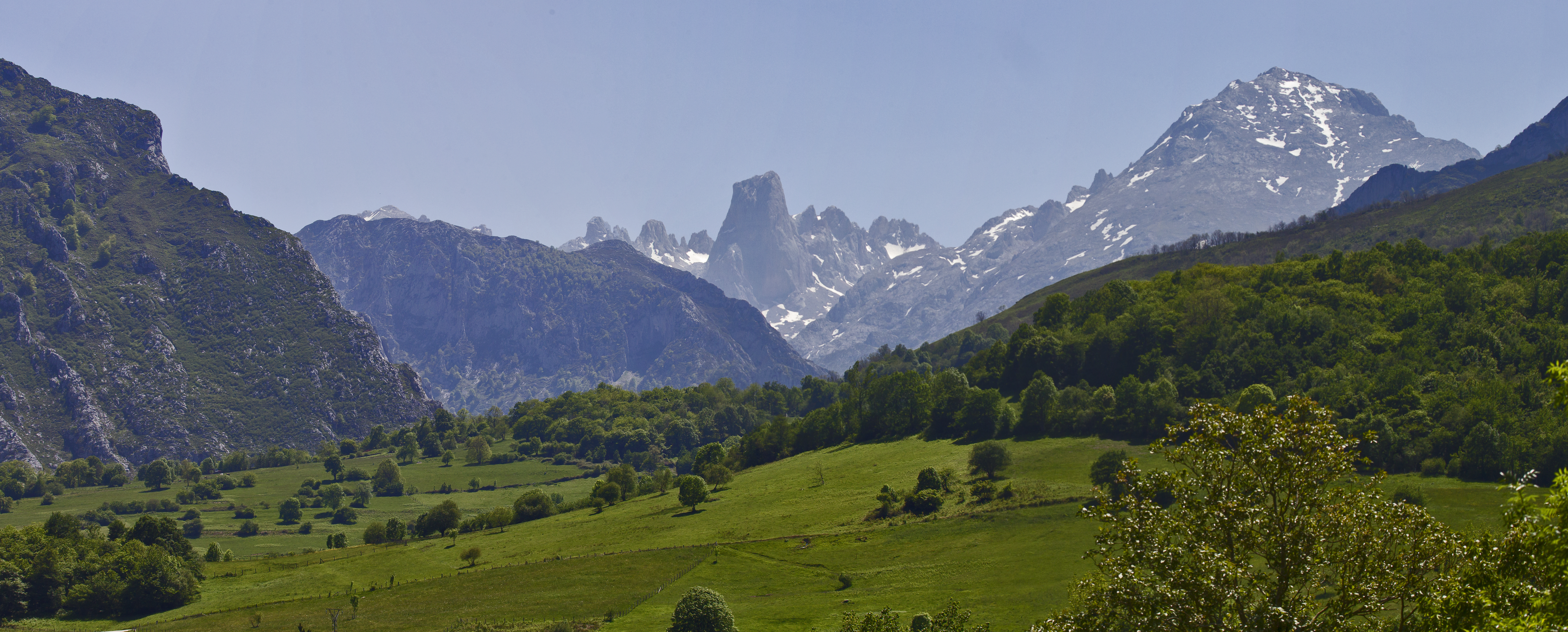
As seen from Pozo de la Oración

- Mediterráneo (500m, [6b,A3])
- Pilar del Cantábrico (500m, 8a+/[6a,A2+])
- Orbayu: The most difficult free climbing route yet open on any mountain. It was opened by the Pou brothers in September 2009 (500m high with a difficulty of 8c+y9a at some stages).

North Face

- Régil (700m, V)
- Pidal-Cainejo (450m, V) (1st ascent of Naranjo de Bulnes, August 5, 1904)

East Face

- Cepeda (350m, 6a)
- Pájaro Loco (200m, 6b)
- Martínez-Somoano (250m, V+ expo)
- Amistad con el Diablo (200m, V+ expo)
- Cainejo (260m, 7b/[6a+, A1])

South Face

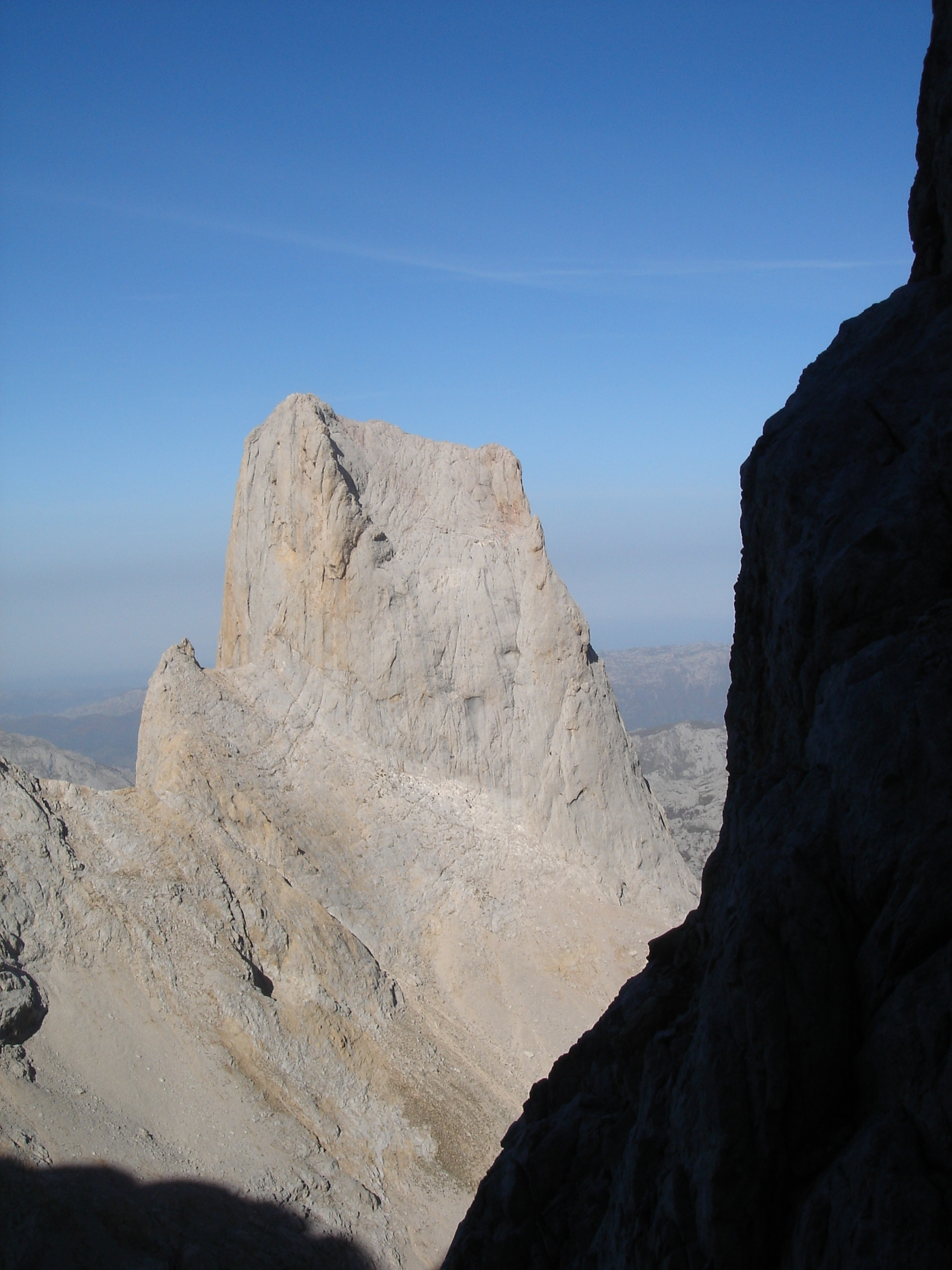
South face

- Nani (300m, V+)
- Directa Hermanos Martínez (155m, V−)
- Invicto y Laureado (160m, 6a+, obl. 6a)
- Me refugio en la bebida (145m, 7a, obl. 6c)
- Pecadillu (300m, 6c, obl. 6b).

The descent via the south face (by the South Direct Line) has 4 rappels, after descending through a part of "The Amphitheatre". This is an unstable region and there are loose rocks.
