= Parapimpinella =

Scientific classification
- Kingdom: Plantae
- Clade: Tracheophytes
- Clade: Angiosperms
- Clade: Eudicots
- Clade: Asterids
- Order: Apiales
- Family: Apiaceae
- Subfamily: Apioideae
- Tribe: Pimpinelleae
- Genus: Parapimpinella; Fern.Prieto, Sanna & Arjona
- Species: P. siifolia

Binomial name
- Parapimpinella siifolia (Leresche) Fern.Prieto, Sanna & Arjona

Synonyms
- Apium siifolium (Leresche) Calest.; Pimpinella cantabrica Bubani; Pimpinella siifolia Leresche (1879) (basionym)

Genus of flowering plants

Parapimpinella is a genus of flowering plants in the family Apiaceae. It includes a single species, Parapimpinella siifolia, a perennial native to the western Pyrenees and northwestern Spain (Picos de Europa).
