= Picos de Europa National Park =

National Park in Spain

- Parque Nacional de Picos de Europa(in Spanish)
- IUCN category II (national park)
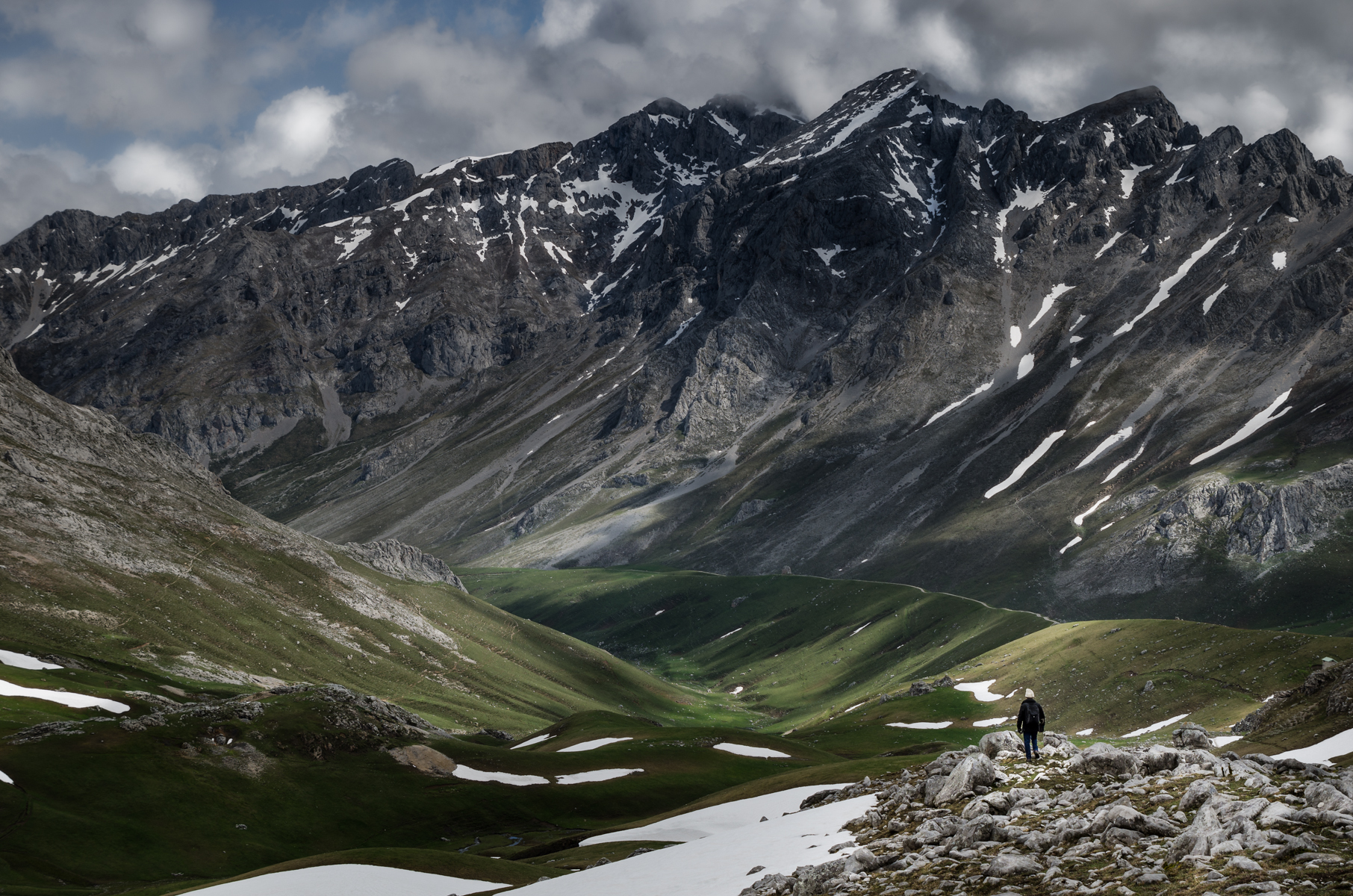
- Location of Picos de Europa
- Location: Picos de Europa, Cantabrian Mountains, Spain
- Nearest city: Asturias: Oviedo, Cantabria: Santander and Castile and Leon: Leon
- Coordinates: 43°11′51″N 4°51′06″W
- Area: 646.60 km^{2} (249.65 sq mi)
- Established: 1918
- Governing body: Ministry of Environment of Spain

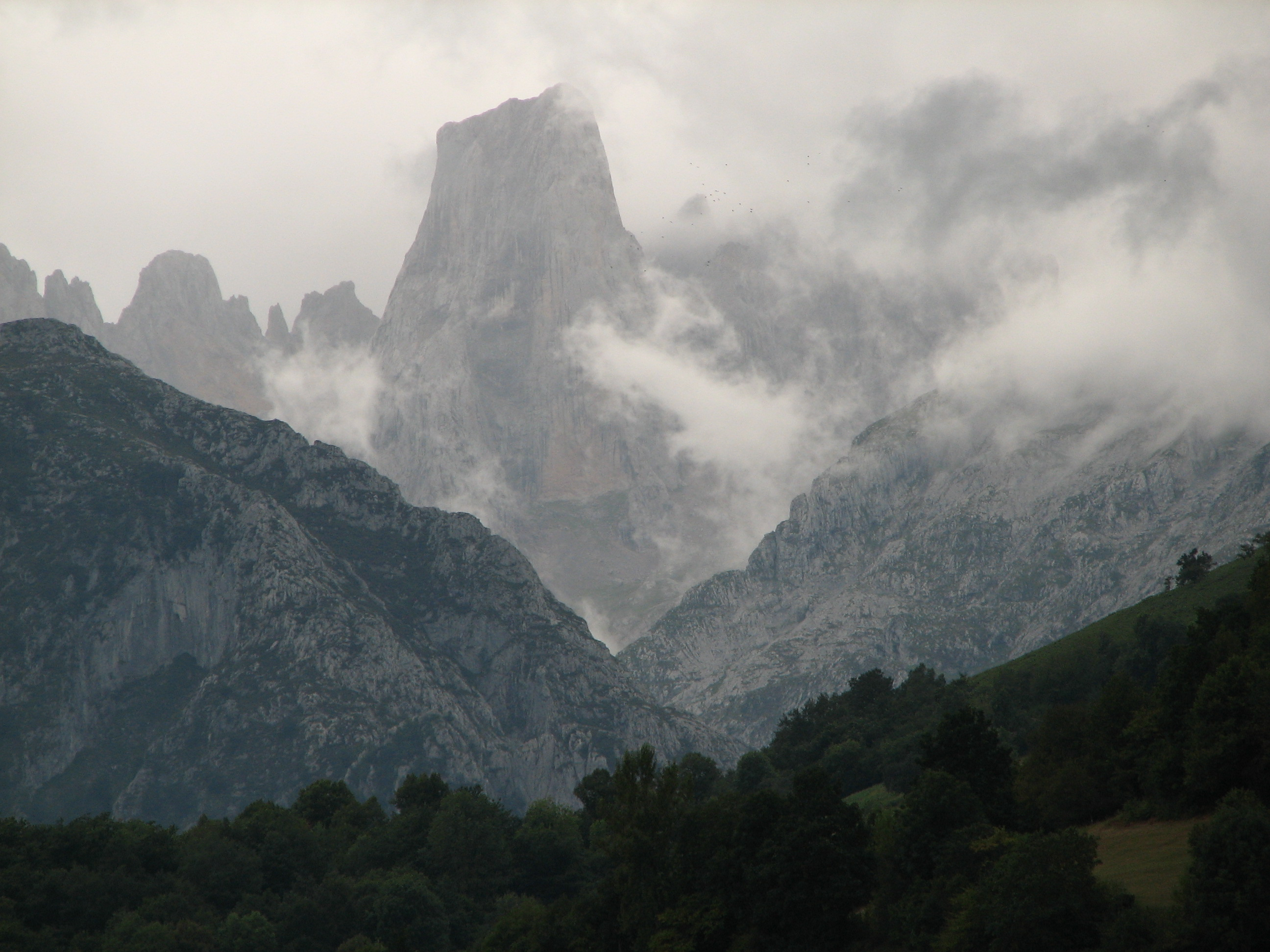
Naranjo de Bulnes

The Picos de Europa National Park (Spanish: Parque Nacional de Picos de Europa) is a National Park in the Picos de Europa mountain range, in northern Spain. It is within the boundaries of three autonomous communities, Asturias, Cantabria and Castile and León, which are represented on the body which runs the park. The park is a popular destination for hikers and trekkers.

== History ==
It was the first of the National Parks of Spain. When it was created 22 July 1918 with help from Pedro Pidal, 1st Marquess of Villaviciosa de Asturias, it covered the western part of today's national park, centered on the Lakes of Covadonga. The Parque Nacional de la Montaña de Covadonga, as it then was called, had an area of 169.25 km². On 30 May 1995 and then on 3 December 2014, the park was extended to include its current total area of 671.27 km².

On 9 July 2003, UNESCO approved Biosphere Reserve status for the National Park. Picos de Europa is one of several biosphere reserves in the Cantabrian Mountains which are being integrated into a single super-reserve to be known as "Gran Cantábrica".

== Geography ==
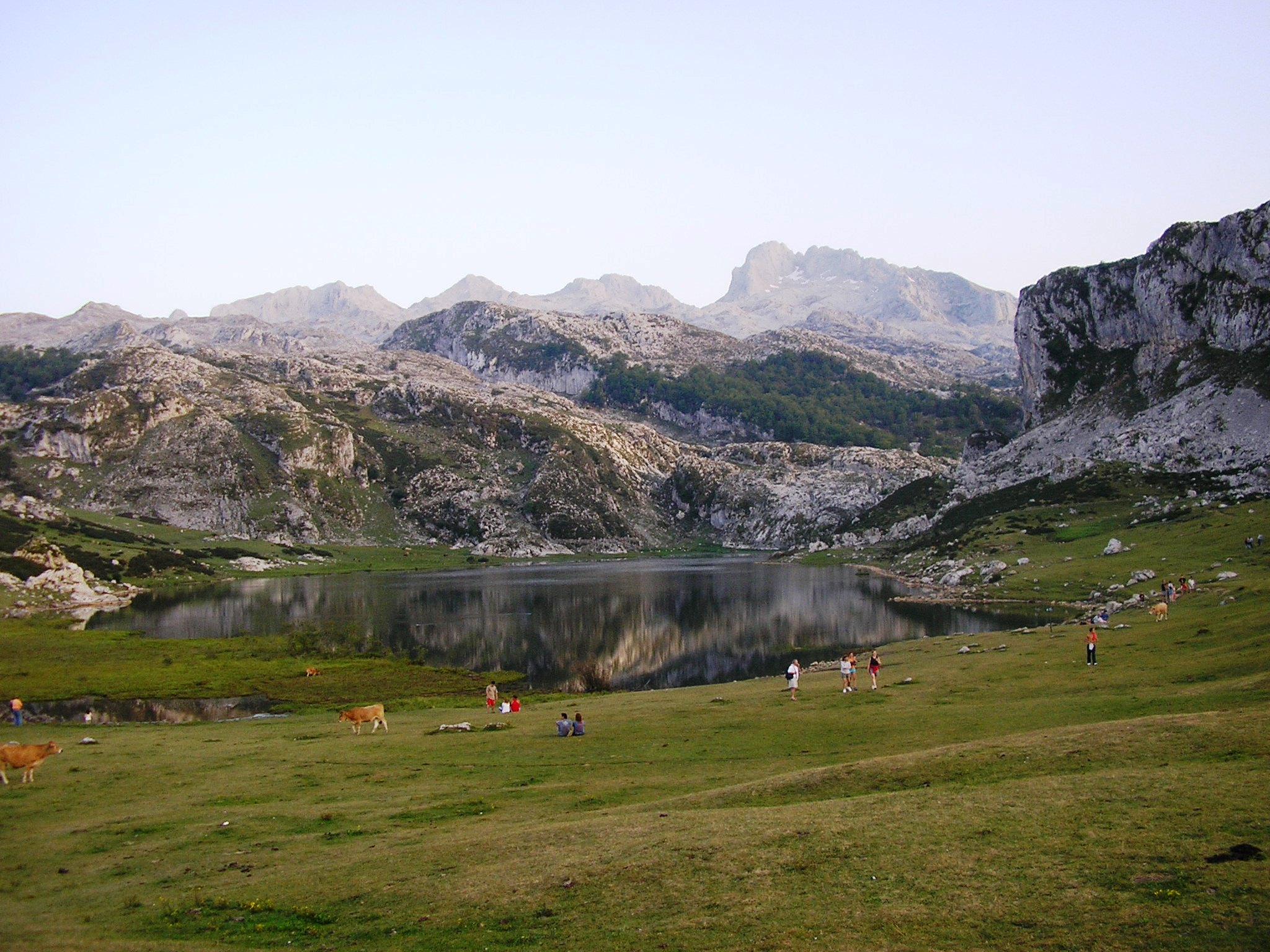
Lago Ercina, one of the Lakes of Covadonga.

The total area of the park is 671 km² and is shared by Castilla y León, Asturias, and Cantabria. The highest point of the park is in Torre de Cerredo peak, 2,648 m AMSL and the lowest point is 75 m AMSL in the Deva River, that is, a vertical drop of 2,573 m.

The geological features of the park show the effects of glacial erosion on the limestone massifs that form the Cantabrian Mountains. The human population is about 1300.

Vega de Liordes, an enclave in the León sector of Picos de Europa belonging to the municipality of Posada de Valdeón registered −35.8 °C (−32.4 °F), a record low temperature, on January 7, 2021.

== Flora and fauna ==
Several types of woods can be found in the area; trees include beeches and Cantabrian Holm Oaks.

There are many protected animal species, like the Cantabrian capercaillie (Tetrao urogallus cantabricus), the Bearded vulture (Gypaetus barbatus), the Cantabrian brown bear and the Iberian wolf (Canis lupus signatus). The most representative animal of the Picos de Europa is the Cantabrian chamois (Rupicapra pyrenaica parva) or rebeco, of which there are many sculptures around the park.

== See also ==
- Redes Natural Park
- San Glorio
- Flora of Cantabria
