= Urrieles Massif =

Massif in Spain

The Urrieles Massif or the Central Massif is a mountainous massif in the north of Spain, one of the three massifs that make up the Picos de Europa, and in turn, one of the stretches of the Cantabrian Massif belonging to the Cantabrian Range. The other two massifs are the Cornión and Ándara. Of the three, it is the tallest. The unique formation of the massif is the result of glacial activity.

Administratively, it belongs to the autonomous communities of the Principality of Asturias, Cantabria, and Castilla y León.

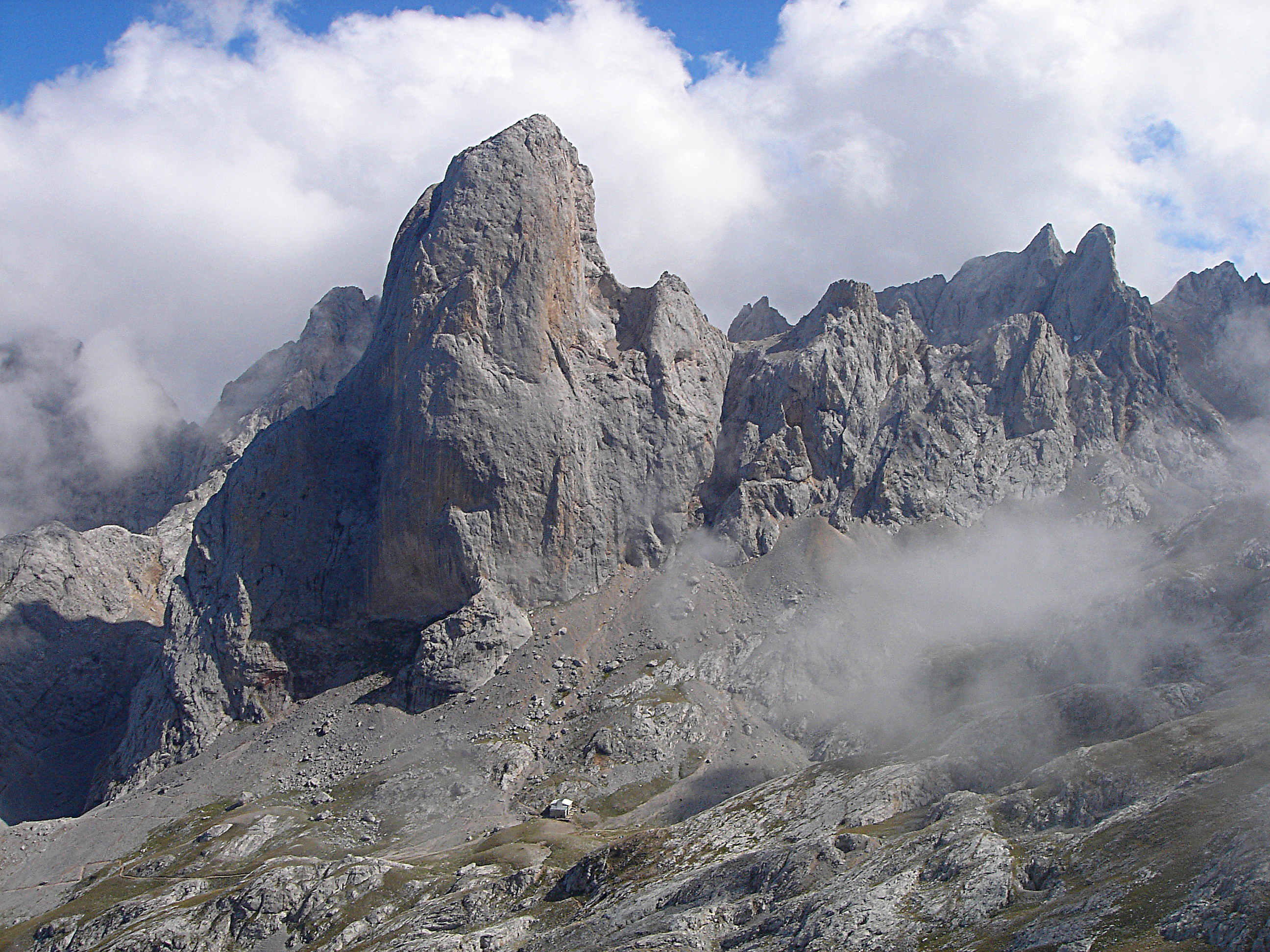
The highest peaks of the Urrieles Massif
	Name	Group	Elevation	Location
01	Torrecerredo	Torrecerredo	2,650	Asturias/León
02	Torre del Llambrión	Llambrión	2,642	León
03	Torre del Tiro Tirso	Llambrión	2,641	León
04	Torre sin Nombre	Llambrión	2,638	León
05	Torre Casiano de Prado	Llambrión	2,622	León
06	Torre Llastria	Llambrión	2,621	León
07	Torre Blanca	Llambrión	2,619	Cantabria/León
08	Peña Vieja	Peña Vieja	2,617	Cantabria
09	Torre de la Palanca	Llambrión	2,614	León
10	Torre de Peñalara	Llambrión	2,607	León
11	Torre Bermeja	Torrecerredo	2,606	Asturias/León
12	Torre del Hoyo Grande	Llambrión	2,602	Asturias
13	Torre del Tiro Navarro I	Naranjo	2,602	Ast/Can
14	Pico de Santa Ana I	Peña Vieja	2,601	Ast/Can
15	Torre de la Párdida	Torrecerredo	2,596	Asturias
16	Pico de Santa Ana II	Peña Vieja	2,596	Ast/Can
17	Torre del Tiro Navarro II	Naranjo	2,596	Ast/Can
18	Torre de las Minas del Carbón	Llambrión	2,595	León
19	Torre de Coello	Torrecerredo	2,584	Asturias
20	Torre del Tiro del Oso	Torrecerredo	2,576	Asturias
21	Los Campanarios II	Naranjo	2,572	Asturias
22	Pico Tesorero	Peña Vieja	2,570	Ast/Can/León
23	Los Campanarios I	Naranjo	2,569	Asturias
24	Los Campanarios III	Naranjo	2,568	Asturias
25	Torre del Tiro Llago	Llambrión	2,567	Can/León
26	Risco Saint Saud	Torrecerredo	2,560	Asturias
27	Neverón de Urriellu	Torrecerredo	2,559	Asturias
28	La Morra	Naranjo	2,554	Asturias
29	Pico de los Cabrones	Torrecerredo	2,552	Asturias
30	Los Campanarios IV	Naranjo	2,543	Asturias
31	Torre de Labrouche	Torrecerredo	2,524	Asturias
32	Pico de Boada]	Torrecerredo	2,523	Asturias
33	Aguja de la Canalona	Peña Vieja	2,519	Cantabria
34	Naranjo de Bulnes	Naranjo	2,519	Asturias
35	Pico Arenizas II	Peña Vieja	2,515	Asturias
36	Pico Madejuno	Llambrión	2,513	Can/León
37	Horcados Rojos	Peña Vieja	2,506	Ast/Can
38	Pico Arenizas I	Peña Vieja	2,504	Asturias
39	Pico Arenizas III	Peña Vieja	2,499	Asturias
40	Aguja de los Cabrones I	Torrecerredo	2,493	Asturias

== Geography ==
Located between the valleys carved by the rivers Cares and Duje is the Central Massif, without doubt one of the most rugged and vertical of the Picos de Europa. Possessing the greatest height of the three massifs, as 38 of its summits rise above 2,500 meters, 14 of them being over 2,600 meters. Only Peña Santa, on the Western massif, would be in that group of 38 mountains above 2,500 meters.

Although less extensive than the Cornión massif, the Urrieles massif has more high-mountain area than the previous, crowned by the Torrecerredo with its altitude of 2,650 meters. However, it is not at that point where the legend of this massif in particular and the Picos de Europa in general were concentrated. To find it we must head east, to the heart of the Urrieles, towards the Naranjo de Bulnes or Picu Urriellu, authentic symbol of the Asturian mountain and the place where they have written, since its conquest in 1905, the most beautiful chapters of Spanish mountaineering. Serving as examples Alberto Rabadá and Ernesto Navarro opened up, in 1962, the first route on its west face, 500 meters of vertical limestone, or the Sueños de Inverno (Winter Dreams) route, which required José Luis García Gallego and Miguel Ángel Diez Vives to hang from said wall for 69 uninterrupted days.

Like Cornión, the Central Massif can be divided into different zones for an easier and more understandable analysis.

=== Main rock group ===
From north to south, the first summits are those of the Main Rock group; highlights among those are the Redondo Cueto [inaccessible peak], the Cabeza la Mesa (which with 1,605 meters is the highest in this group) and the Cabecina Quemada.

To the west one finds Bulnes, a village that, as much for its location as for the isolation that geography has subjected it to for centuries, perhaps best represents man's presence in this hostile environment. From Bulnes, through the Balcosín channel first, and then the Camburero channel, one comes to the base of the peak that shares the same name, the Naranjo de Bulnes.

=== Picu Urriellu Group ===
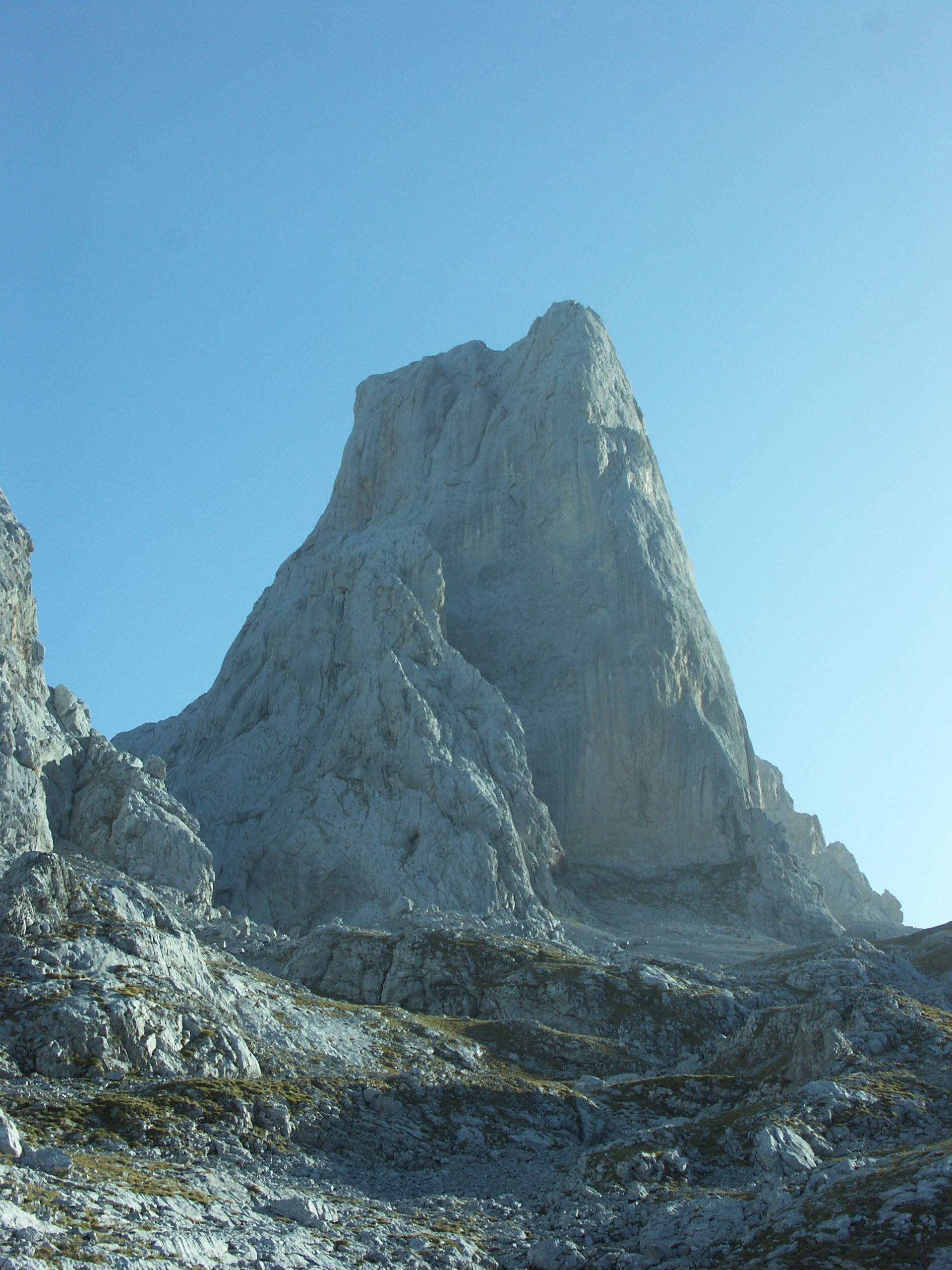
Approaching Naranjo.

The boundaries of this collection of summits are located between the Santa Ana pass in the south and the Castil rock in the northern part.

Starting from the south the Tiro Navarro towers (2,602 m) are highlighted, together with three taller summits which are unique in that they exceed 2,600 meters. To the north, through the Gallows of Infranzon (2,482 m) one finds the Companarios (bell tower), another triple summit whose maximum height rises to 2,572 meters. To the east of this group and through the Jou de Infanzon one finds the Tiros de Santiagos tower and a little farther to the north, the Cuchallon de Villasobrada (2,416 m).

The Naranjo de Bulnes make up, together with the mountains in its range, the Jou Tras El Picu, a circle of mountains which create within its hollow center so spectacular a depth. Starting from the north and following the pointer of the clock, appears the Carnizoso tower (2,332 m), the Oso (Bear) tower (2,461 m), the Risco Victor (Victor Craig) and the falsely named Collada Bonita (Beautiful Hill), the Martinez Spire (2,422 m) from where it descends to the Collada Bonita (2,382 m), a favored place to observe the southern face of the Picu. Continuing towards the south appears the Colladetas Tower (2,456 M) and next the Morra (Hill), a two-headed summit that has a maximum height of 2,554 meters, which is supposed to be the tallest of all the surrounding mountains, together with the Naranjo, the Jou Tras El Picu. The western area of the Jou Tras el Uriellu is covered by the Tiros de la Torca (2,386 m), the southern edge of the Picu Urriellu 2,519 m), from the start of the Canal de la Celada to the Vega de Uriellu.

To the east of this group would be left only the Pena Castil (2,444 m), an impressive pyramid that marks the end, from the north, of the great heights of the Urrieles.

=== Torrecerredo Group ===
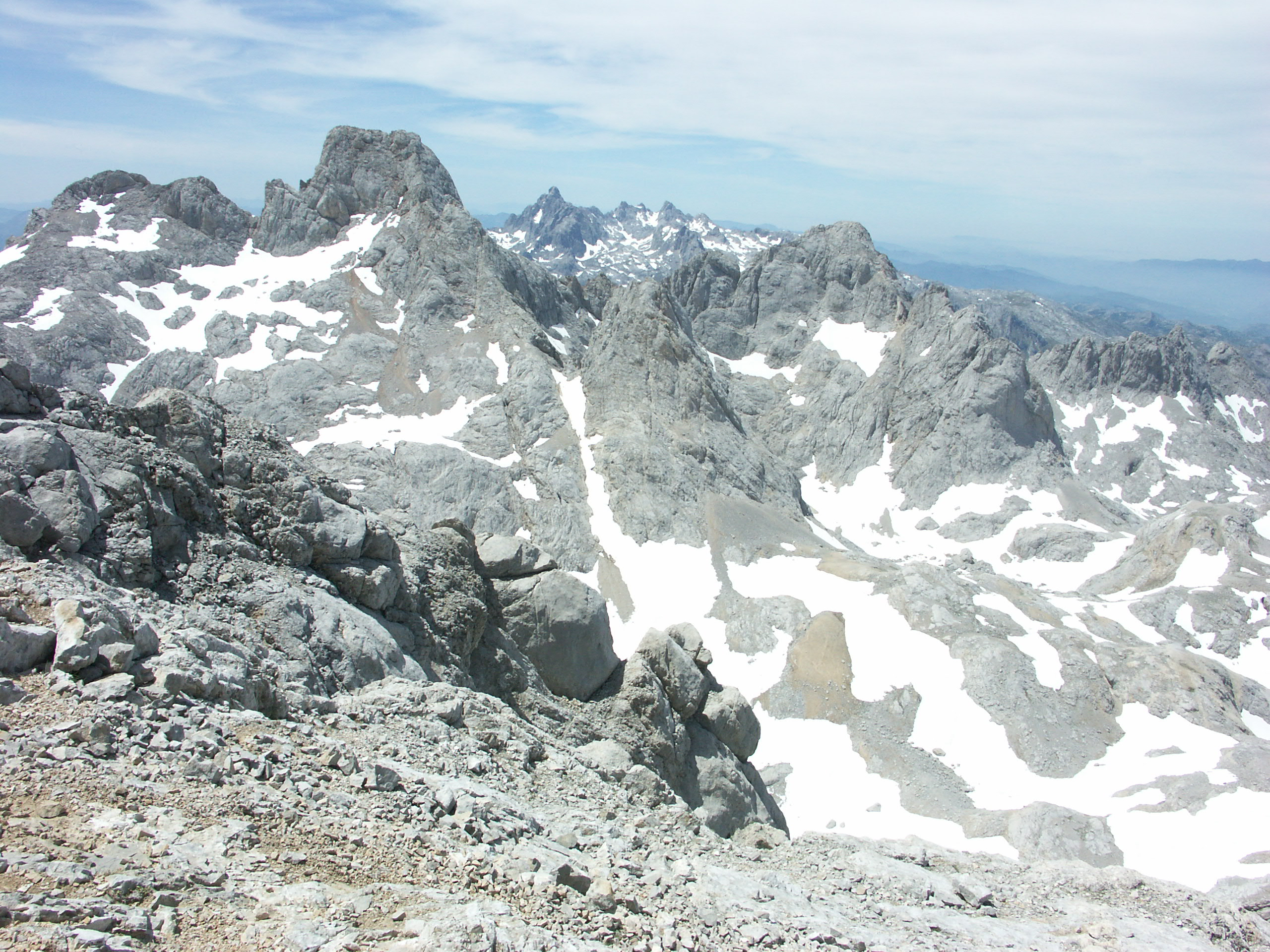
Torrecerredo and Carbones. Among them, the western mountains, always presided by the Penas Santas.

Geographically this area is found to the west of the Picu Urriellu and borders more to the west with the Rio Cares. From north to south, it begins with the Murallon de Amuesa that rapidly goes gaining height until it forms the first summits, which join from the Trave(2,253 meters, the tallest) and after exceeding the Collada del Agua, the Pico de Dobresengros (2,395 m). It was baptized with the same name the Canal de Dobresengros, flowing through that part of the surrounding area of Cain and which accesses, after covering a distance of two thousand meters, the highest point in this area.

To the south of the Pico de Dobresengros appears, impressively, the Cabones group. First is the Agujas de Cabrones (2,474 m) and then the Pico de los Cabrones (2,553 m), a summit which, toward the east, shelters the Jou de los Cabrones, an especially dry area and a place where one finds the Jose Ramon Lueje refuge (2,035 m) and the Trave System, a collection of three chasms that, with its 1,441 metres of depth is the most significant of the Picos.

Without almost resting, the symbol of this area is reached, the Torrecerredo (2,650 m), roof of the Urrieles and the highest point in many hundreds of kilometers around. It is also an exceptional place to observe the Holy Penas massif.

The Torrecerredo is accompanied by two points with unique names, because of its faces emerges the Risco Saint Saud (2,575 m) and, slightly more below, the Torre de Labrouche (2,525 m). These summits take their names from two illustrious characters from Picos de Europa, (European Peaks), the count of Saint Saud and Paul Labrouche, long time companions and discoverers, during the end of the 19th century, one of many of the secrets of these mountains.

Continuing toward the south, attached to Torrecerredo is the Bermeja Tower (2,606 m) and, after going through the Collada Bermeja (red hill)(2,485 m), the Coello Tower (2,584m). Turning toward the east and then to the north, one finds the Tiro del Oso (2,576 m) and beyond that the Horcada de Don Carlos (2,418 m), the Pico de Boada (2,523 m). Finally, the Torre de la Pardida (2,596 m), a summit that has views to the west face of the Naranjo de Bulnes as well as to Torrecerredo and, beyond, to the Cornion.

From the Torre de la Pardida steering north one discovers the Neveron de Uriellu (2,559 m), another exceptional observation point from which to admire the west face of the Naranjo, and the Diente de Urriellu. More to the north, and after crossing the Horcada Arenera, the Conjunto de Los Albos emerges. In this high altitude group the Neveron Albo (2,442 m), the Cueto Albo (2,414 m) and the three Torres Areneras (2,445 meters taller) are highlighted. From Los Albos, continuing toward the north, runs the Canal de Camburero and, from Balcosin until reaching the town of Bulnes.

=== Vieja rock group ===
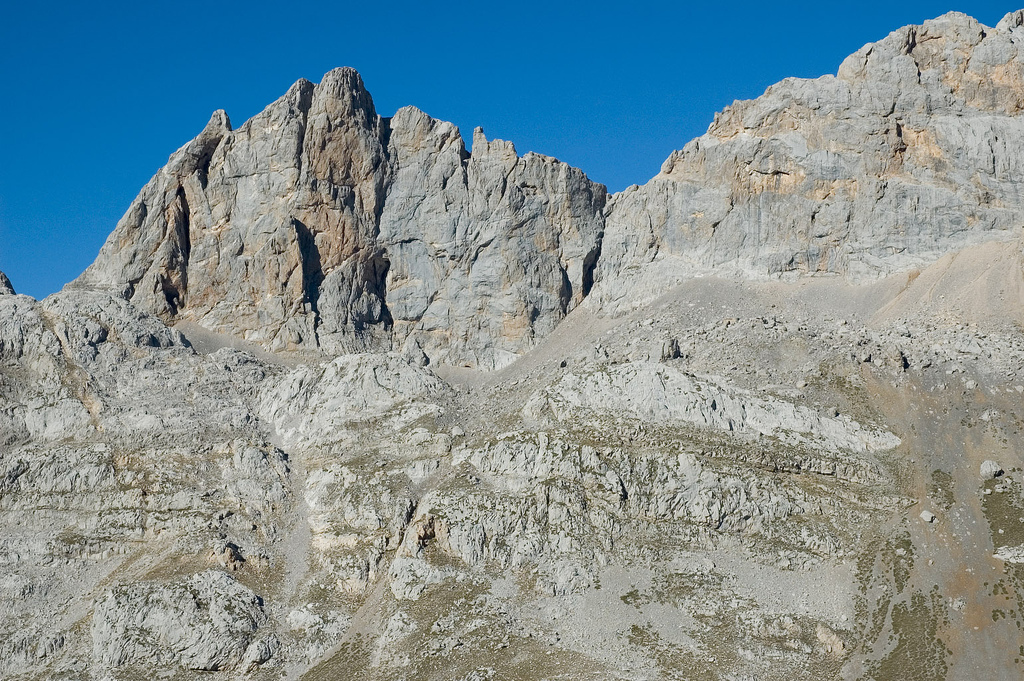
Red Gallows.

Cutting through the southern zone of the previous area, in other words, from the Tiro del Oso, and following the Astur-Leonesa border, you pick up the Picos Arenizas, a triple summit whose greater height reaches 2,515 meters. Continuing this path toward the south of the Urrieles appears the slender and pyramidal peak Tesorero (2,570 m), notable for being the point where the three provinces that share the territory of Picos de Europa meet, this is Asturias, Cantabria and Leon.

Tracing the line that separates from Leon and that follows the dividing line between Asturias and Cantabria towards the east rises the tower of the Horcados Rojos (2,506 m) and beyond, the peaks of Santa Ana ( the tallest of which exceeds by only a meter the barrier of 2,600 m).

In the southeastern direction, back in the Cantabrian region, two sharp spires, one of Canalona and one of Bustamante, precede the Vieja group, which with its 2,169 meters is the greater elevation of this group of mountains and of all Cantabria. To the south, back in the boundaries of this massif, is the Pena Olvidada (2,430 m) and to the northeast from the peaks of Santa Ana reaching to the towers of the Tiro Navarro, already previously commented on. The Arenizas group, --Tesorero, Horcados Rojos, Santa Ana, and Tiro Navarro—give shape to the jou de los Boches, which is to the south of the jou Sin Tierre, which in turn flows into it, more to the north, in the Vega de Urriellu.

In the opposite direction, to the south of the Horcados Rojos would be the jou Sin Tierre, at whose northwest end one finds the Cabana Veronica refuge (2,325 m), the most unusual discovery in Picos, because its structure is the metal dome of antiaircraft batteries of an aircraft carrier vessel.

To the north of the Vieja group, going through the so-called joint of San Juan de la Cuadra to enter the astur region, would give access to the valley of the Monetas, leaving to the west the picu Urriellu group and reaching towards the meadows of Sotres (eastern boundary of the Urrieles) the picturesque lake of the Monetas.

Some notable summits of this small mountain range would be las Coteras Rojas (2,295 meters higher), la Gamona (2,291 m), el cuetu la Cuadra (2,231 m), el Paredon del Albo (2,125 m) or el Escamellau (2,063 m).

On the eastern slope of rock Vieja are the meadows of Áliva where the Duje river rises, and serve as a division between the Central massif and the Andara massif. It is a busy road between the upper station of the Fuente De cable car, and the village Espinama, so it is considered one of the doors of Liébana, to Picos de Europa. Here we find the Refugio de Aliva, still the greater capacity among the locations in the surrounding area of the Picos.

=== Llambrion Section ===
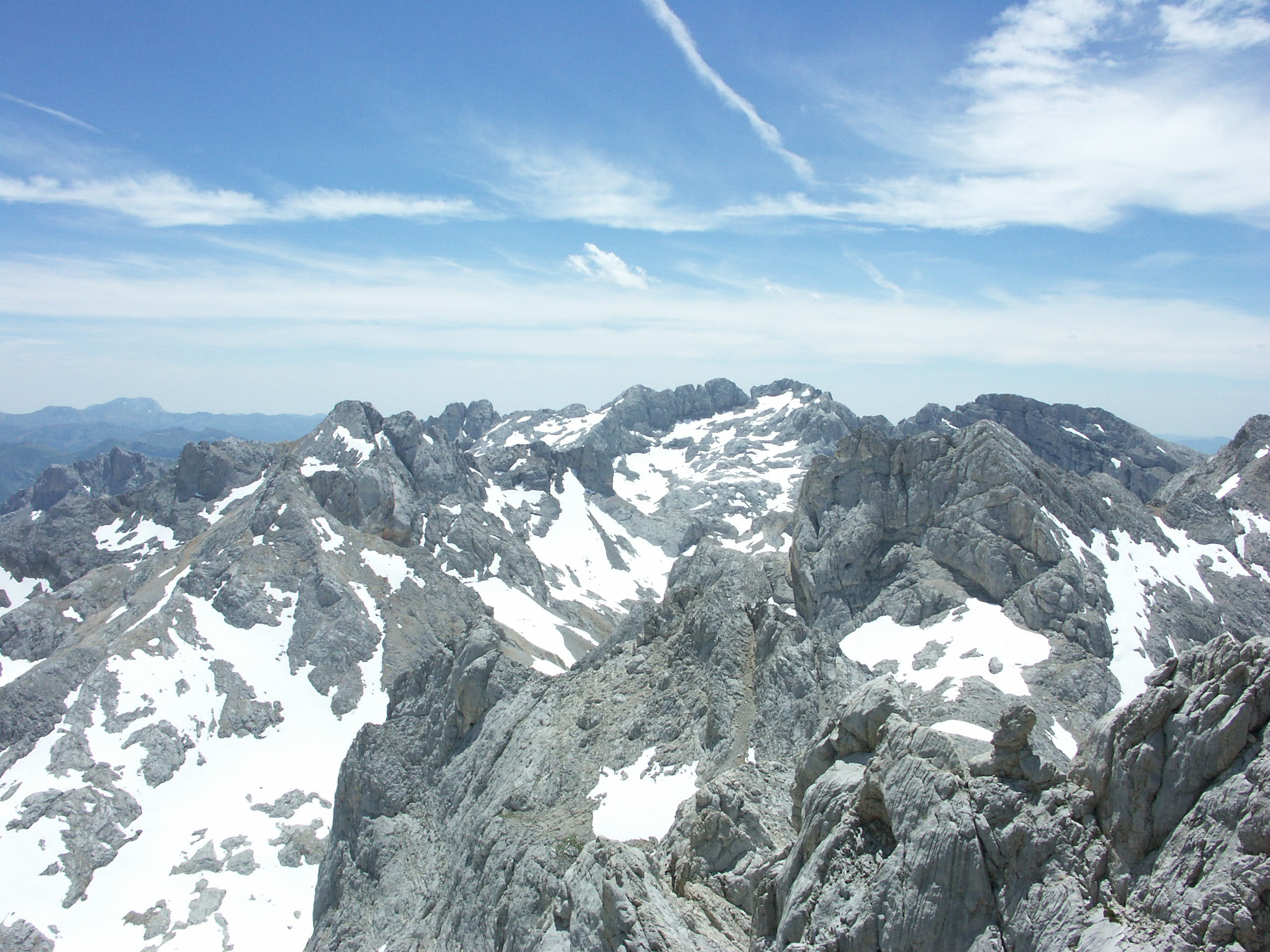
The Llambrión area.

In this area located at the southwest of the central massif is the largest concentration of Picos de Europa's peaks, with various heights of over 2,600 meters. Specifically it includes nine of the fourteen peaks that exceed 2,600 meters.

Around Llambrión tower (2,642 meters and the roof of this group) can be found heights of great importance and all are nearby. Highlighting, because of its height that rivals with Llambrion's own, el Tiro Tirso, with its 2,641 meters of altitude. Also are the Sin Nombre tower (2,638 meters and currently in stages of being baptized as Schulze tower, en honor of this pioneering figure of the Picos de Eruopa), the Casiano de Prado tower (2,622 m), la torre de la Llastrias (2,621 m), la torre Blanca (2,617 m), la torre de la Palanca (2,614 m), la torre Penalara (2,607m) and la torre del Hoyo Grande (2,602 m). To the south of the Casiano de Prado tower you can mention the torre de las Minas del Carbon, that remains at 2,595 meters of elevation.

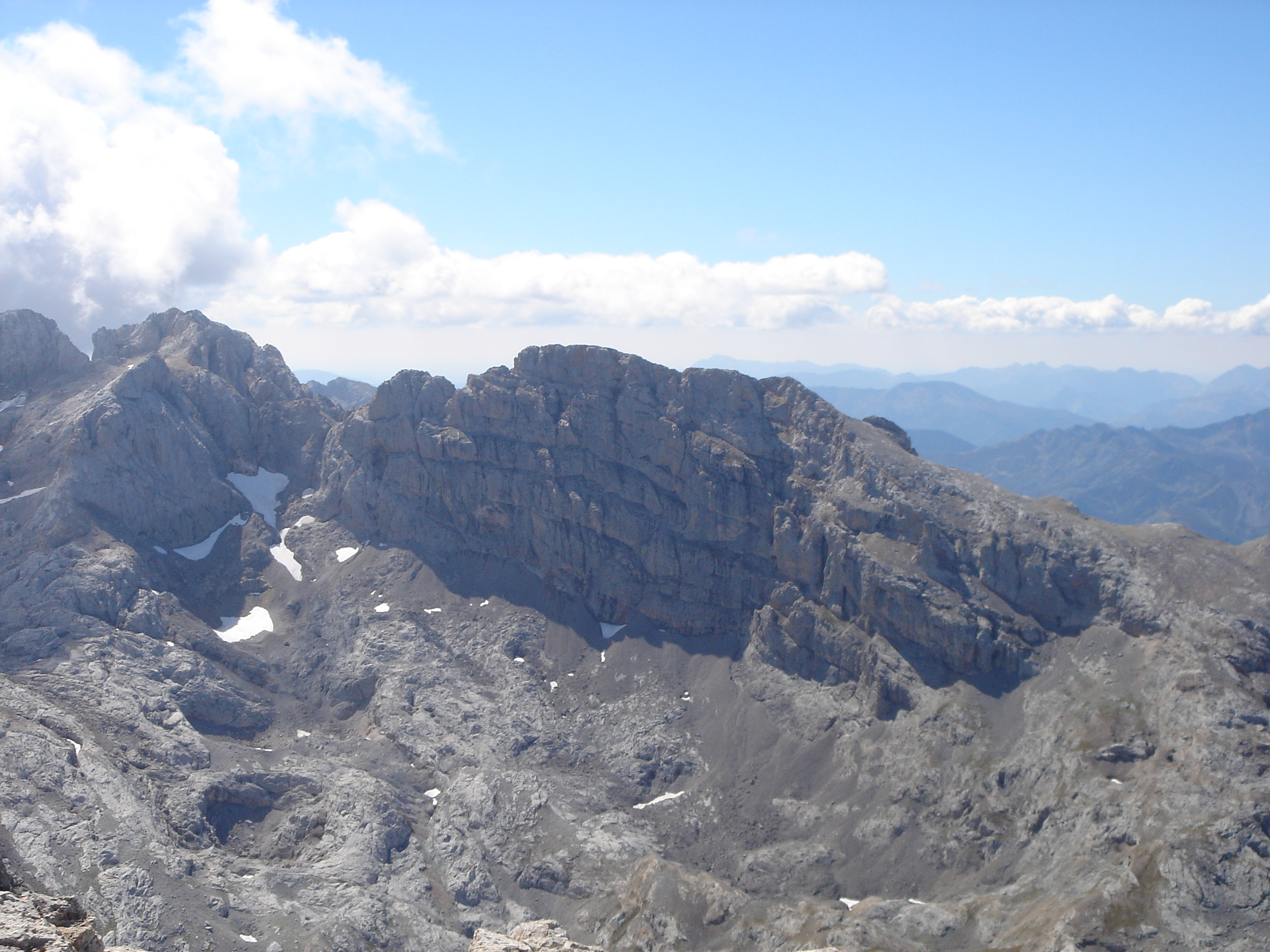
The impressive wall north of the torre de la Palanca (2,614m).

To the southeast of the Blanca tower rises up important elevations, like the Tiro Llago, the Madejuno or the Tiros de Casares back in the vicinity of cabana Veronica. Continuing toward the southeast, another summit that emerges, as the torre del Hoyo Oscuro, the San Carlos peak, the torre del Altaiz or the pico de la Padierna, which draws near to Fuente De, in the extreme south of the Urrieles.

To the west of the torre de la Palanca rises three important towers, the de Diego Mella, the de Delgado Ubeda and torre de Penalba. Continuing in that western direction it begins to lose height with summits of minor importance to reach to the channel of the Rio Cares. It is advisable to emphasize, at the small start the route to the river, the torre de la Celada (2,470m), as much as by its height as by the other name with which it has also been baptized, Torre de Don Pedro Pida, in honor of the man whose name probably is the most important in the history of these mountains.

=== Cifuentes Rocks ===
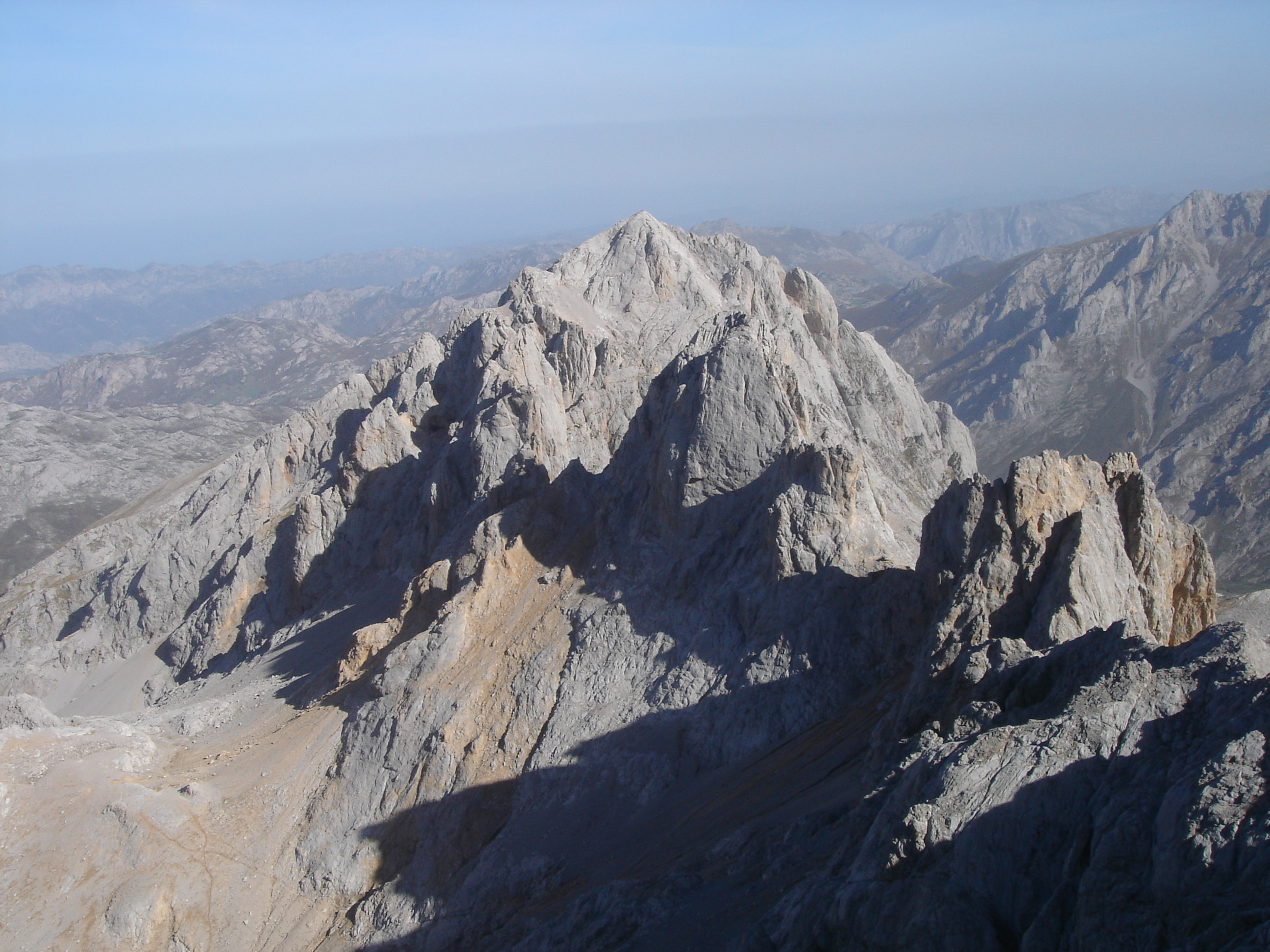
Peña Castillo Pyramid (2,444 m).

In the most southern area of the Urrieles, specifically between Cordinanes and Fuente De, rises up a great wall of mountains that receive the name of the Cifuentes groups. Of notable extent, they can be divided into three areas thanks to the two passes that go through them.

In the western part, very near the Rio Cares, the Aguja de Maria del Carmen is highlighted, which is followed by the Borracho, Cantadota, and the torre de las Mojosas. Each one of these mountains increases in height, patrolling this last torre de las Mojosas (2,000 m). More to the east, rounding up by the south the Hoyo de las Mojosas, appears the Aguja de Maria Luisa (2,386 m) and immediately after, the torre del Friero (2,445 m), that although it is not that little, it is the highest of this group, indeed it is the mountain that shows the most difficult walls, especially in its northern slope.

More to the east is accessed the Canal de la Cabida (2,160 m), that separates the area of the Friero del central, presided over by the torre de Salinas (2,446 m). But before arriving at the roof of the eastern group one finds the torre del Hoyo Chico (2,356 m) and the torre del Hoyo de Liordes (2,474 m), the roof of this formation.

Continuing in this direction one finds the Canal del Pedavejo (2,030 m), that gives way to the height of the Canal, the Regaliz group (triple summit, being the highest at 2,229 m) and the Remona group (2,227 m). Beyond there it descends toward Fuente De, a thousand meters lower.

To the east of Fuente De, now apart from the cordal de las Penas Cifuentes, you find the summits like Joracao or Valdermoro, that patrol at 1,800 meters and that mark the end of the Urrieles on the southeast.

== See also ==
- Picos de Europa
