= Fuente Dé cable car =

Aerial lift line in Cantabria, Spain

Coordinates: 43.1442°N 4.8122°W

Fuente Dé cable car Teleférico de Fuente Dé
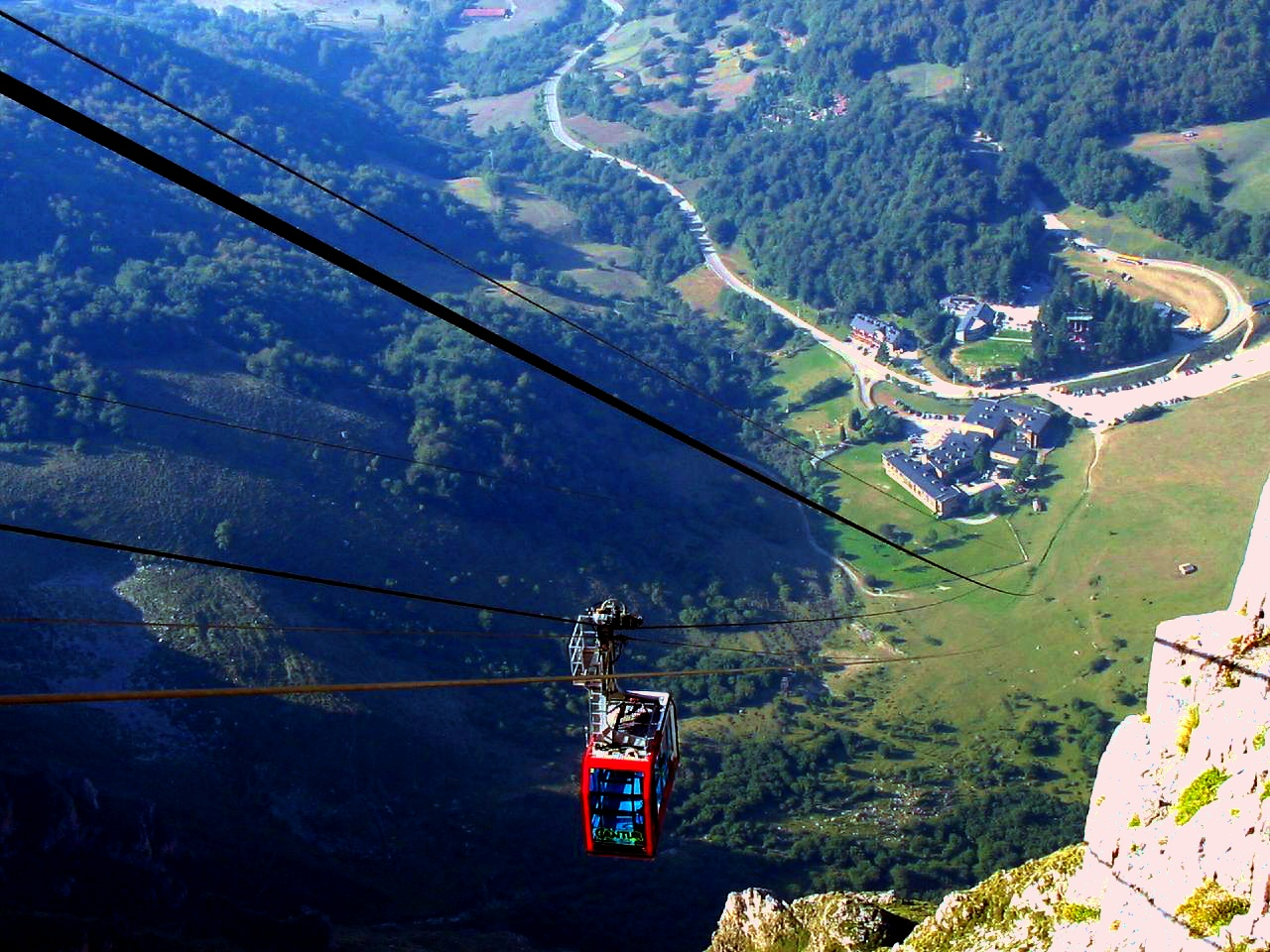
- Interactive map of Fuente Dé cable car Teleférico de Fuente Dé

Overview
- Status: Operational
- Location: Camaleño, Spain
- Open: 1966

Operation
- Owner: Cantur S.A.
- Operator: Cantur S.A.
- Carrier capacity: 20 Passengers per cabin, 2 cabins
- Trip duration: 3 min 40

Technical features
- Line length: 1.45 kilometres (0.9 mi)
- Vertical Interval: 753 m (2,470 ft)

Fuente Dé cable car (in Spanish teleférico de Fuente Dé) is an aerial lift line of Cantabria (Spain).

== History ==
The idea of connecting a high-mountain area in the heart of Picos de Europa with Fuente Dé was firstly developed by José Antonio Odriozola, former president of the ''Federación Española de Montañismo (Spanish Mountaineering Federation), whose family was from comarca of Liébana. The line was designed by engineer José Calavera Ruiz and architect Ángel Hernández Morales. Its construction started in November 1962 and the opening ceremony was held on August 21, 1966.

== Features ==
The line covers a 753-metre (2,470 ft) vertical drop. Its bottom station is located at 1,090-metre (3,576 ft) and the upper one at 1,850-metre (6,070 ft). The cabins have a capacity of 20 people and the trip, which does not have intermediate stops, lasts 3m 40s. The line has a single span and two independent sections with one cabin each, that can be operated separately. The length of the cables is 1,450-metre (4,757 ft) and the speed of the cabins is 10 metres per second (33 ft/s). Fuente Dé ropeway is the longest single-span aerial lift of Europe.
