= Torre Cerredo =

Mountain in Spain

Torre de Cerredo
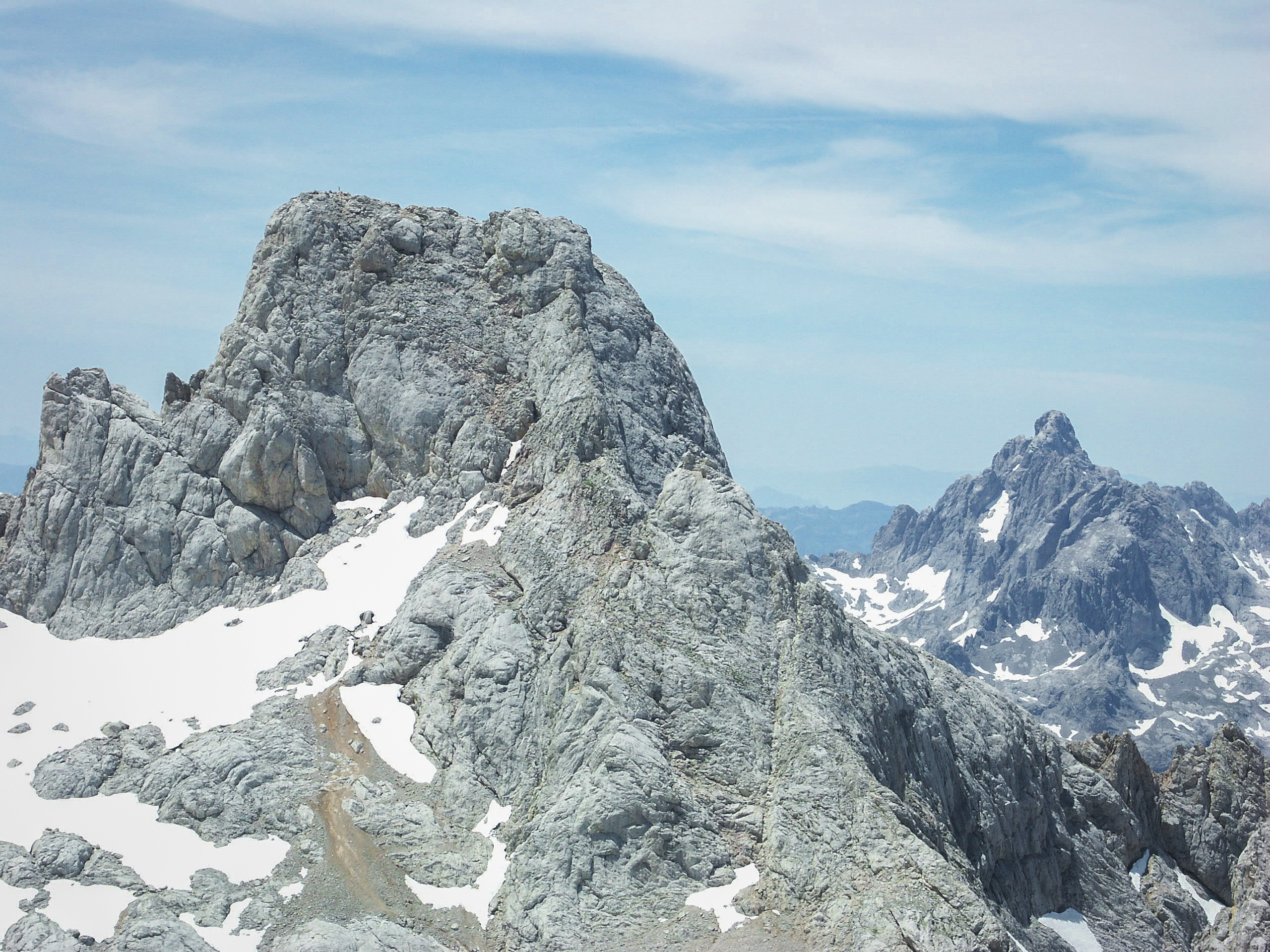
- Torrecerredo from Torre de la Párdida.

Highest point
- Elevation: 2,650 m (8,690 ft)
- Prominence: 1,931 m (6,335 ft)
- Listing: Ultra, Ribu
- Coordinates: 43°11′52″N 4°51′06″W

Geography
- Location within Spain
- Location: Asturias/Castilla y León, Spain
- Parent range: Picos de Europa, Cantabrian Mountains

Climbing
- First ascent: June 30, 1882
- Easiest route: basic snow/rock climb

Torre Cerredo, also called Torrecerredo or Torre de Cerredo (Asturian: La Torre Cerréu), is the highest peak of the Cantabrian Mountains, northern Spain. With a prominence of 1,931 m, it is an ultra-prominent peak and the third most prominent peak of the Iberian Peninsula.

== Geography ==
The mountain has an elevation of 2,650 metres, making it the highest peak of the Picos de Europa and the Cantabrian Mountains. Torre Cerredo is located on the central massif of the Picos de Europa, the Urrieles Massif, on the limits of the provinces Asturias and León. Its summit towers 2,200 metres over the river Cares and offers wide views over the western massif and the Cares' tributaries.

== Climbing ==
Torre Cerredo was first ascended by Aymar d'Arlot de Saint Saud, Paul Labrouche, Juan Suárez, de Espinama and Francois Salles, from Gavarnie, on June 30, 1882.

The easiest ascent route starts at Jou de Cerredo; the last 200 metres are an easy rock climb that does not require special equipment. The most common approach uses the refuges of Jou de los Cabrones and Vega de Urriellu.

== See also ==
- List of European ultra-prominent peaks
