= Wilhelm Phillip Daniel Schulz =

German geologist and engineer

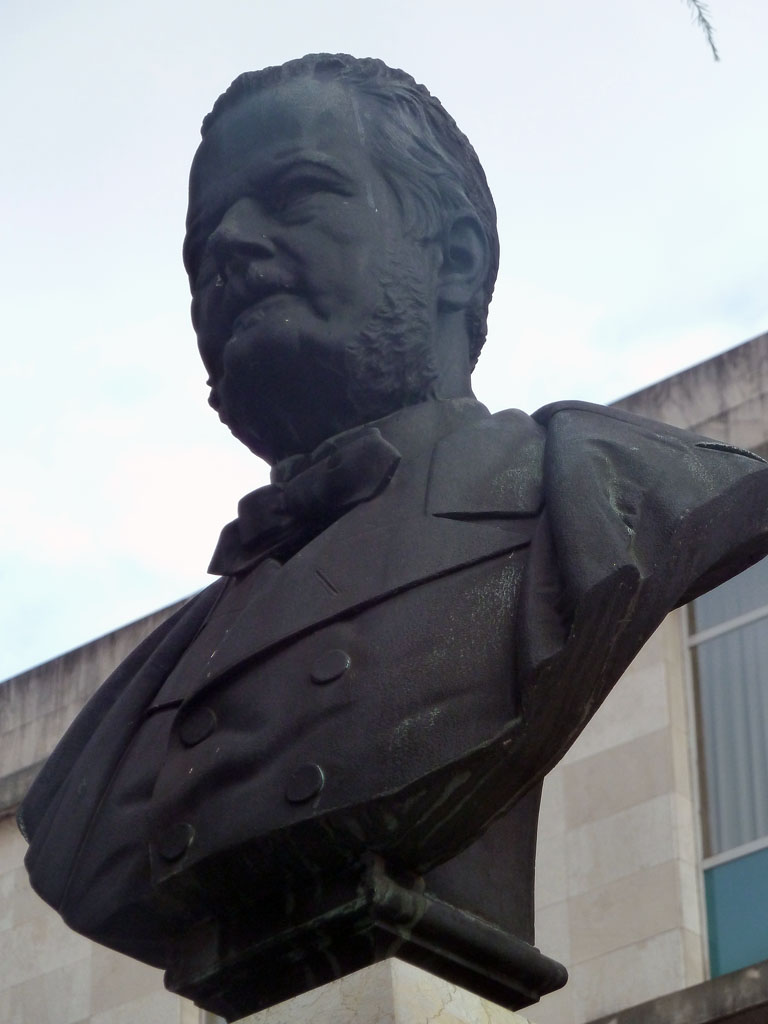
Wihelm Phillip Daniel Schulz

Wilhelm Phillip Daniel Schulz (6 March 1805 – 1 August 1877), also known in Spain as Guillermo Schulz, was a German mine engineer and geologist who spent most of his professional life in Spain. He was born in Dörnberg and died in Aranjuez.

== Career ==
On April 18, 1823, he began studying mining engineering at the Georgia Augusta University of Göttingen. Upon completing his studies, he was hired by a mining company that operated the lead mines of the Sierra de Gádor in Almería. Shortly was hired by the Spanish Government to enhance the mining industry in the country. Around 1830 he returned to Germany. The Spanish government was very interested in hiring him, and in 1830 sent him to Silesia, where he was staying, his appointment as Commissioner of Mines. Before he returned to Spain, he was tasked with visiting several German and Hungarian mines and factories to further perfect his knowledge. In 1831 he returned to Spain, and in 1832 the General Directorate of Mines commissioned him to study the geology of Galicia and to prepare the corresponding petrographic map, a project that was expected to be completed within two years . The work was ultimately published in 1835.

In 1833 he was appointed Mining Inspector for Asturias and Galicia. On 4 December 1834, a royal decree entrusted him with the preparation of the petrographic map of Asturias. In 1837, he published a preliminary account of the work completed thus far in the Bulletin de la Société Géologique de France. In order to carry out the project comprehensively, he first decided to produce a detailed topographic map, a task that required nine years of work and was completed in 1853 at a scale of 1:127,500. It was published in 1855 under the title Geographical Map of the Province of Oviedo. Using this map as a basis, Schulz prepared the book Geological Description of the Province of Oviedo (1858), which included a geological map at a scale of 1:400,000. This same scale would later be adopted by the Geological Map Commission for the publication of the geological map of Spain in 1889. In 1844 he was appointed General Mining Inspector for Asturias. It was in Asturias where, for many years, he carried out outstanding geological and industrial work which he made public in several books.

In December 1853, the Practical School of Mines in Mieres was established and officially inaugurated in 1855, with Schulz responsible for designing the curriculum. On 15 December 1853, he was promoted to First Inspector General of the Mining Corps and subsequently became president of the Higher Technical Mining Board and director of the Madrid School of Mines. In August 1854, he was also appointed president of the Geological Map Commission, a position from which he resigned in 1857 due to the lack of funding and personnel. He voluntarily retired from his remaining posts, effective 1 January 1861.

== Main publications ==
- Schulz, G. 1835. Descripción Geognóstica del Reino de Galicia. Imprenta de Herederos de Collado. Madrid. 52 pp and one chart.
- Schulz, G. 1837. Note sur la Geologie de Asturias. Bulletin de la Societé Geologique de la France, vol. 8, 325-328.
- Schulz, G. 1838. Reseña geognóstica del Principado de Asturias. Anales de Minas, vol. 1, 361-378.
- Schulz, G. 1838. Ojeada sobre el estado actual de la minería del distrito de Asturias y Galicia. Anales de Minas, vol. I, 379-397
- Schulz, G. 1844. Reseña de los principales criaderos de carbón de Asturias, su situación respecto al mar, estado de las empresas que los explotan e indicación de los caminos y la mejora de los puertos que hacen falta para su laboreo en grande. Boletín Oficial de Minas, Is.13, 10-16.
- Schulz, G. 1858. Descripción geológica de la provincia de Oviedo. Impr. de José González, Madrid, 138 pp. With one plate and two charts.
