= Picos de Europa =

Mountain range in Spain

- English: Peaks of Europe
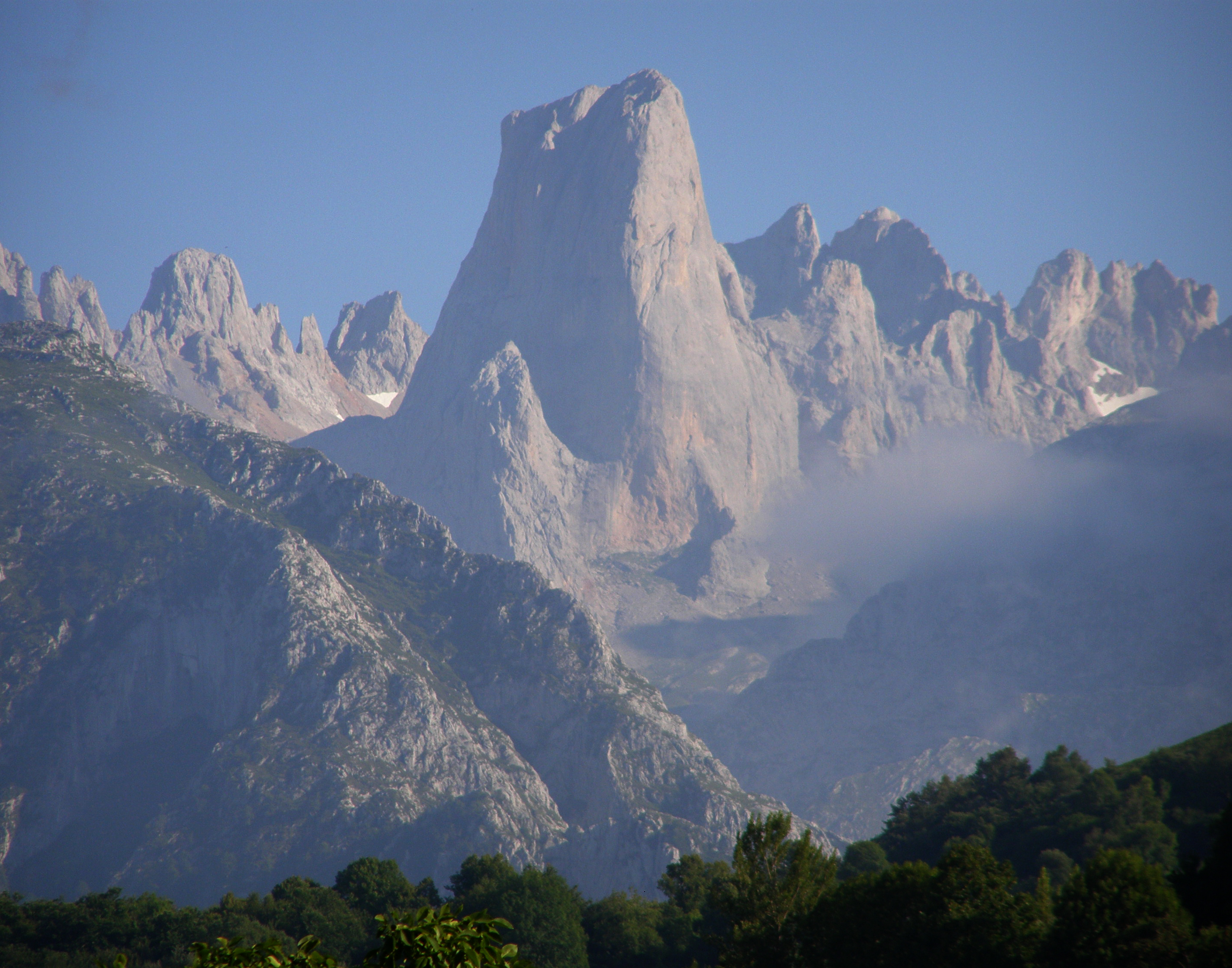
- Naranjo de Bulnes (Picu Urriellu) seen from Pozo de la Oración, Cabrales, Asturias.

Highest point
- Peak: Torre de Cerredo
- Elevation: 2,650 m (8,690 ft)
- Coordinates: 43°11′51″N 04°51′06″W

Dimensions
- Area: 646 km^{2} (249 mi^{2})

Naming
- Etymology: Named for Europe

Geography
- Location within Spain
- Country: Spain
- Region: Iberian Peninsula
- Range coordinates: 43°12′N 4°48′W
- Parent range: Cantabrian Mountains

Geology
- Rock type: limestone

The Picos de Europa ("Peaks of Europe", also the Picos) are a mountain range extending for about 20 km (12 mi), forming part of the Cantabrian Mountains in northern Spain. The range is situated in the Autonomous Communities of Asturias, Cantabria and Castile and León. The highest peak is Torre de Cerredo, at an elevation of 2650 m (8,690 ft).

== Name ==
A widely accepted origin for the name is that they were the first sight of Europe for ships arriving from the Americas. The name can be traced to Lucio Marineo Sículo, who mentioned the Rupes Europae in 1530. Ambrosio Morales, chronist of Felipe II of Spain, mentions the Montañas de Europa in 1572. Prudencio de Sandoval calls them the Peñas o Sierras de Europa in 1601.

== History ==
In ancient times, this mountainous region was inhabited by various peoples, including the Cantabri, an ancient Celtic tribe. The Cantabri were known for their resistance against Roman invasions and their rugged way of life in the mountains.

== Geography ==
The range consists of three major massifs: Central (also known as Urrieles), Eastern (Ándara) and Western (also known as the Picos de Cornión). The Central and Western massifs are separated by the 1.5 kilometres (0.93 mi) deep Cares Gorge (Garganta del Cares), with the village of Caín at its head. The waters in the Cares mostly arise from cave resurgences. Some of the water in the Cares river is diverted through a hydroelectric scheme, with a canal running in the northern wall of the gorge to Camarmeña.

Almost all of the rock in the Picos is limestone, and glacial action has contributed to create an area of alpine karst. The highest peak is Torre de Cerredo, with a height of 2,650 metres. Many other peaks reach altitudes of over 2,600 m. The area is popular with mountaineers, climbers and mountain walkers. There is a network of well-established mountain refuges. A major climbing site is the Naranjo de Bulnes or Picu Urriellu, in the Urrieles massif.

Vega de Liordes, an enclave in the León sector of Picos de Europa belonging to the municipality of Posada de Valdeón registered −35.8 °C (−32.4 °F) on January 7, 2021.

== Nature ==
Cantabrian brown bears and wolves live in the more remote regions. The Cantabrian chamois is fairly frequently seen (according to a 2006 Ministry of the Environment report, there were around 8,000 sightings that year); choughs and buzzards are common, various eagles and vultures are frequently seen, and there is a diverse butterfly population in the park.

Most of the region is now protected as a single Picos de Europa National Park in Cantabria, Asturias and León provinces of Spain; the Asturian part was Spain's first National Park. Access is via minor roads to each of the three massifs from the north, and from the south to the Fuente Dé cable car and to Caín at the head of the Cares Canyon.

== Caves ==
The Picos de Europa is mainly formed by calcareous rocks. Contain at least 3,648 cavities, that involve 355 km of conduits. 235 cavities are from 100 to 500 m in depth, 55 caves are between 500 and 1,000 m and 14 shafts are deeper than 1 km, including many of world's deepest caves, including Torca del Cerro (−1589 m), Sima de la Cornisa (−1507 m), Torca los Rebecos (−1255 m) and Pozo del Madejuno (−1252 m). Discovery of new caves and their exploration still continues.

== Gastronomy ==
The Picos support a dwindling group of shepherds who move up from the valleys in the summer with their sheep, goats, cows, and an occasional pig. The area is famed for its piquant blue cheeses, such as Cabrales cheese and Picón Bejes-Tresviso.

== Gallery ==
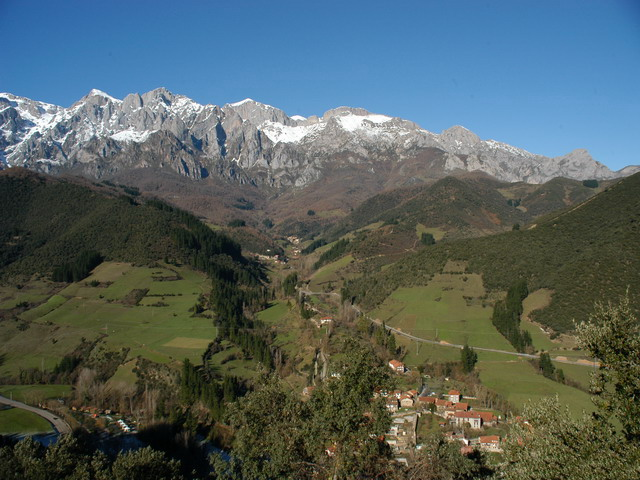
The village of Turieno, at the foot of the Picos

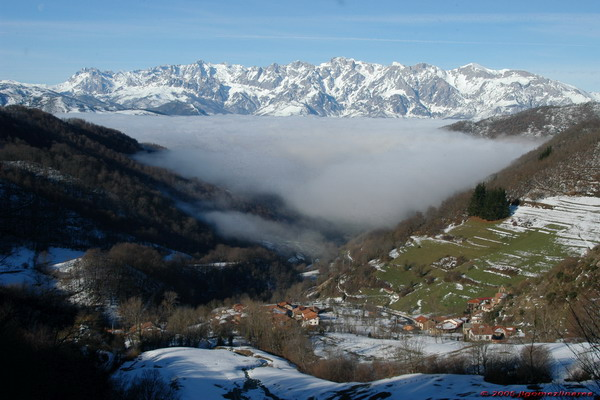
Lamedo, in Liébana (Cantabria)

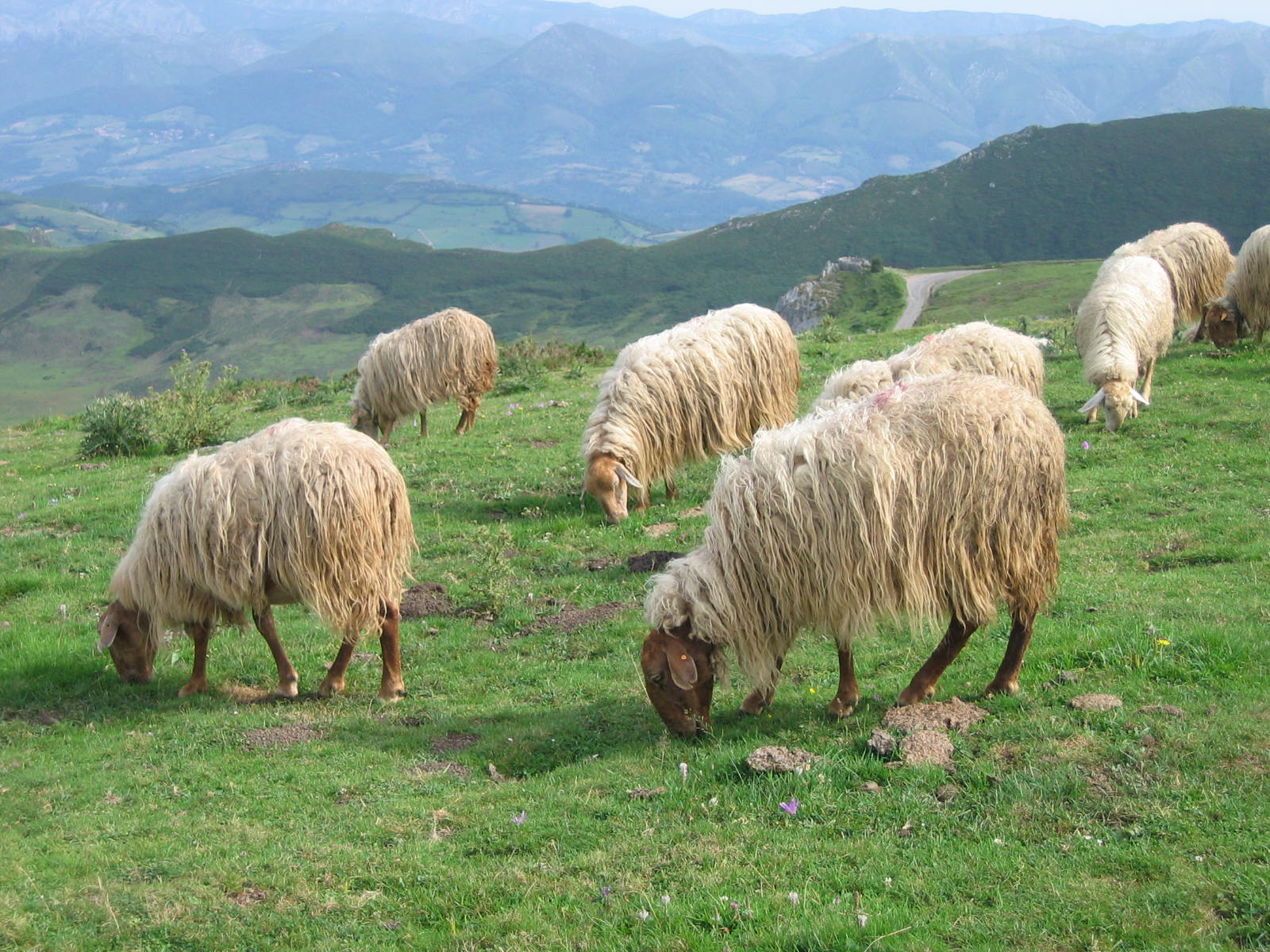
Asturian sheep grazing in the Picos de Europa

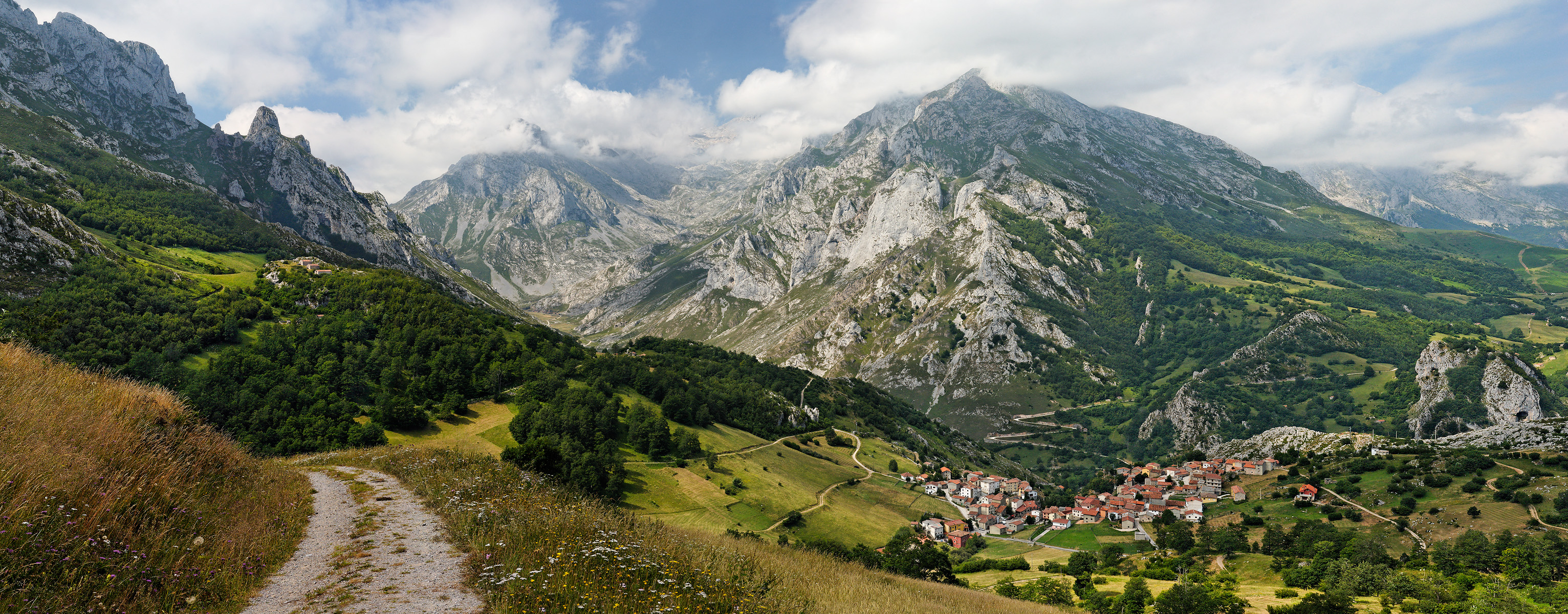
Sotres (Asturias)

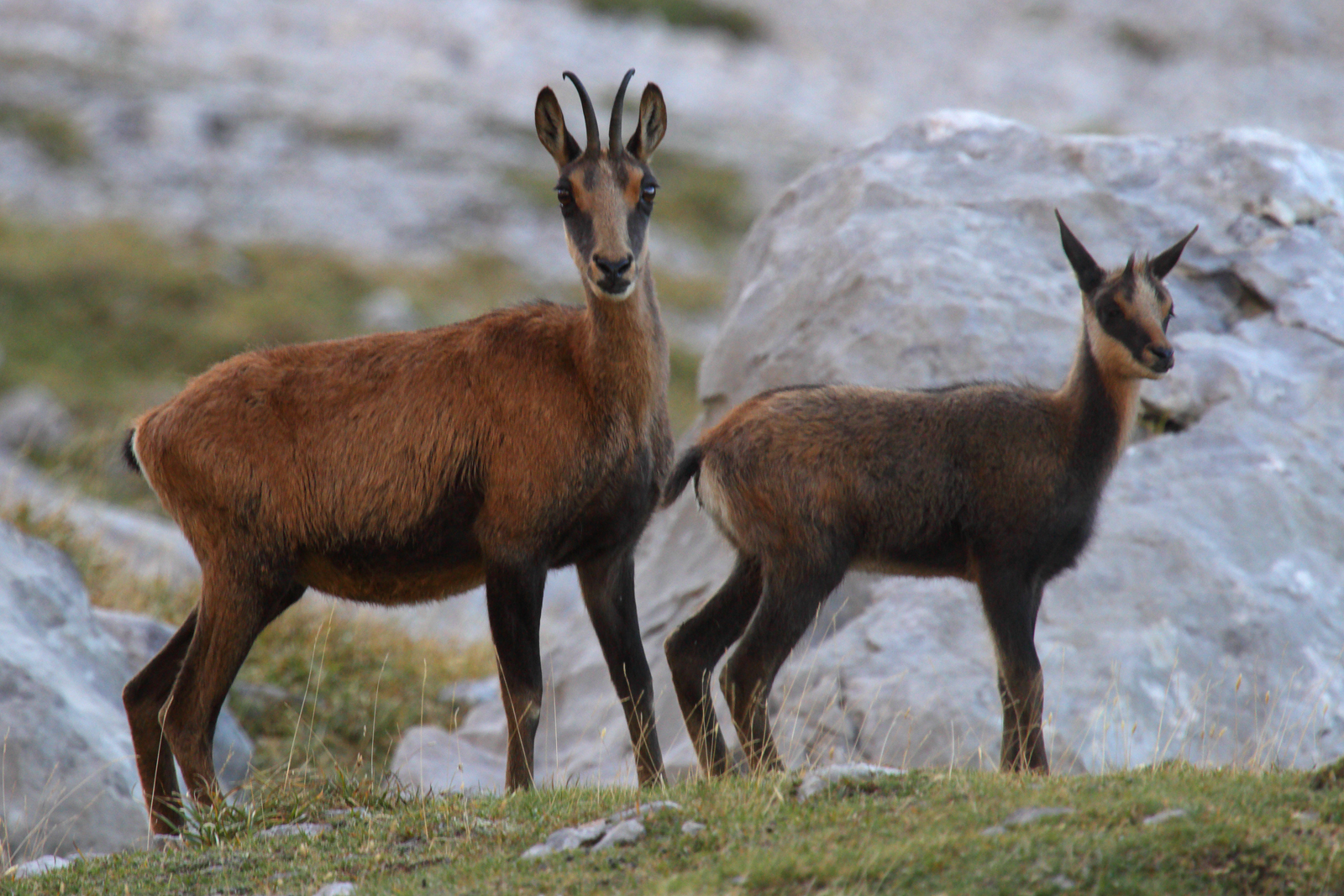
Cantabrian chamois, Picos de Europa

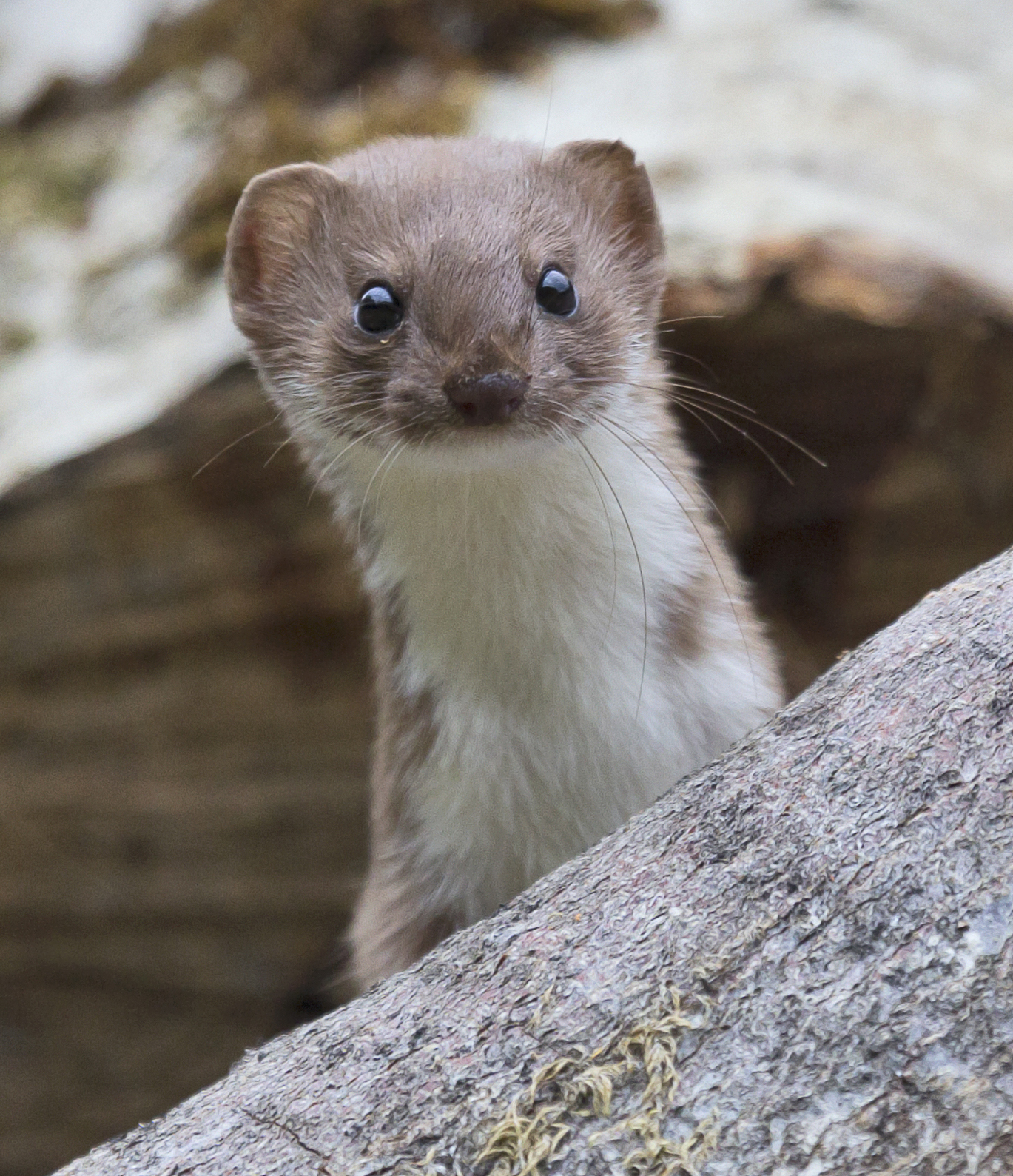
Mustela nivalis, Picos de Europa

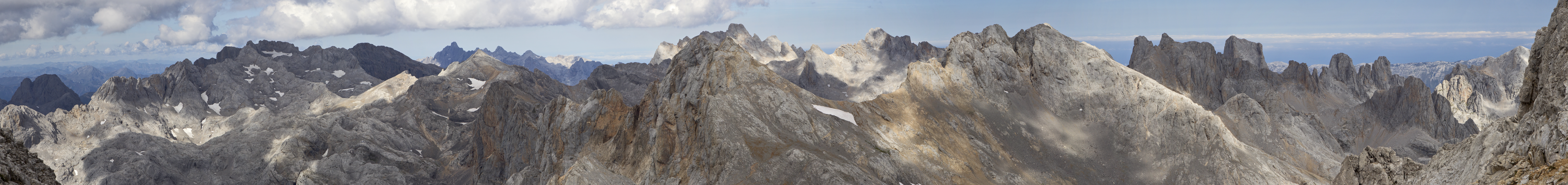
Picos de Europa, from Peña Vieja

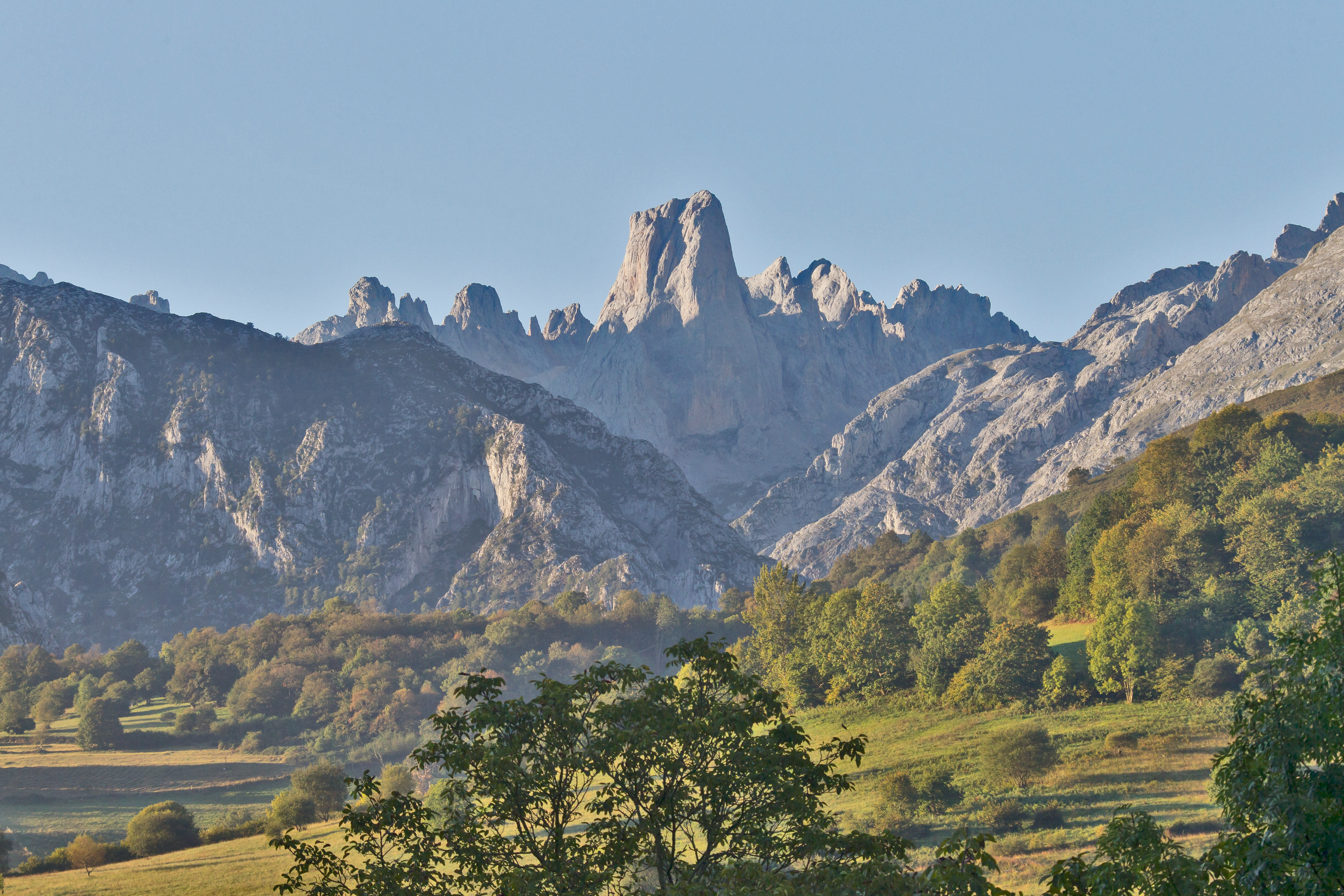
Urriellu peak (Naranjo de Bulnes) from Pozo de La Oracion

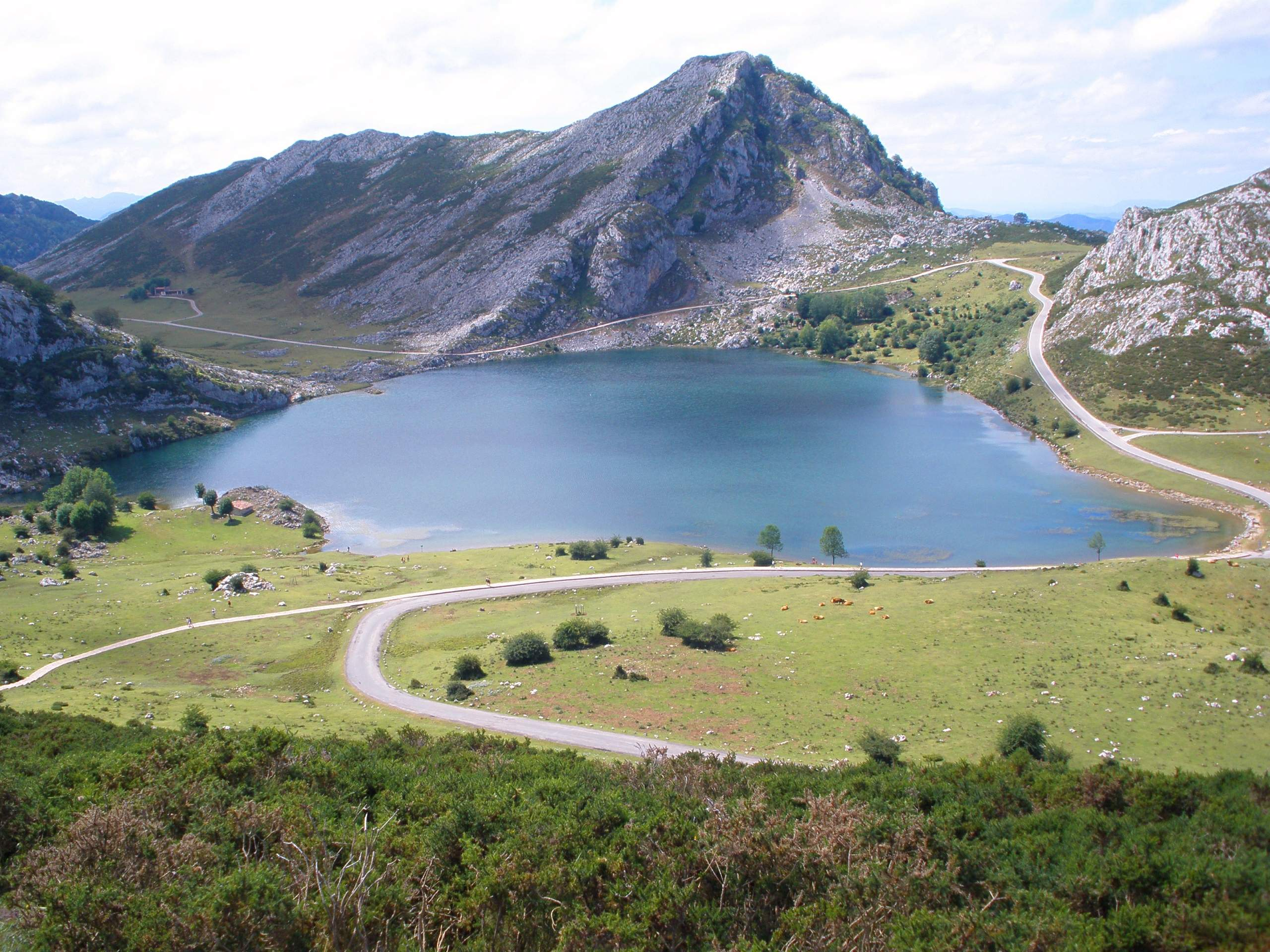
Lake Enol

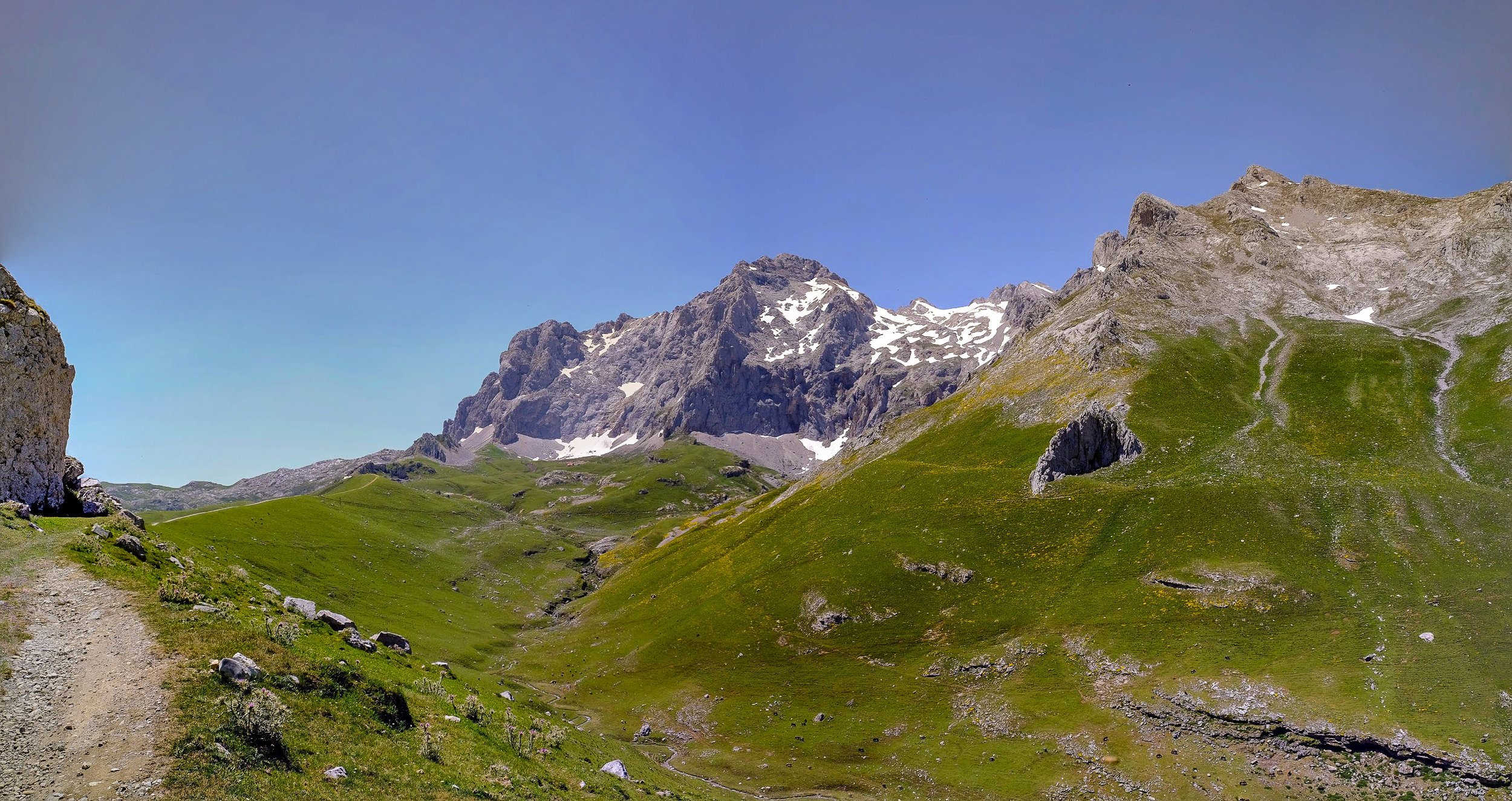
Remote road in the Picos de Europa
