= Spider (disambiguation) =

A spider is a type of arthropod.

Spider, Spiders or The Spider may also refer to:

== Arts, entertainment and media ==
=== Fictional characters ===
==== Comics ====
- Spider (DC Comics), a character introduced in 1940
- Phantom Troupe, also known as the Spiders, characters in the Hunter × Hunter manga series
- Spider, a cartoon character in Osamu Tezuka's Star System
- Spider Jerusalem, the protagonist of the comic book Transmetropolitan
- The Spider (British comics), a 1965–1969 British comic book character, later reprinted in Vulcan
- Spider-Man, a Marvel Comics superhero character
- Spider-Man (disambiguation)

==== Other fictional characters ====
- Spider (pulp fiction character), the hero of a 1933–1943 pulp magazine (see Periodicals subsection below)
- Spider, a character in Mega Man X: Command Mission
- Spiderlegs, a ghost in an episode of The Real Ghostbusters
- The Spider, the eunuch Varys in George R.R. Martin's A Song of Ice and Fire and its TV adaptation, Game of Thrones
- Spider Nugent, a character in Coronation Street

=== Films ===
- The Spider (1916 film), by Robert G. Vignola
- The Spiders (film), 1919, by Fritz Lang
- The Spider (1931 film), by MacKenna and Menzies
- The Spider (1940 film), by Maurice Elvey
- The Spider (1945 film), by Robert D. Webb
- Spiders (film), a 2000 American science fiction horror film
- Spider (1992 film), by Vasily Mass
- Spider (2002 film), by David Cronenberg
- Spider (2007 film), by Nash Edgerton
- Spiders 3D, 2013, by Tibor Takács
- The Spider, or Earth vs. the Spider
- The Spider, 2012 film by Robert Sigl
- Spider (2019 film), Chile
- The Spider (2022 film), Egypt

=== Gaming ===
- Spider (solitaire), a card game
- Spiders (company), a French video game developer
- Spiders (video game), a 1981 arcade game
- Spider: The Secret of Bryce Manor, a 2009 iPhone game
- Spider: The Video Game, a 1997 video game developed by Boss Game Studios

=== Literature ===
- "The Spider" (Danish: Edderkoppen), a 1901 short story by Carl Ewald, collected in his 1907 book of short stories The Spider, and Other Tales
- "The Spider" (short story), a 1908 short story by Hanns Heinz Ewers
- The Spider, a 1910 novel by Fergus Hume
- "Spider", a 1929 short story by Eden Phillpotts, from his short story anthology The Torch and Other Tales (1929)
- "Spider", a 2000 short story by John Pelan
- Spider (novel), a 1990 novel by Patrick McGrath
- Al-Ankabut ("The Spider"), the 29th sura of the Qur'an

=== Music ===
==== Groups ====
- Spider (American band), a 1980s American rock band
- Spider (British band), a UK rock band formed in 1976
- Spiders (British band), a 2010s British indie band
- Spiders (Swedish band), a 2010s Swedish rock band
- The Spiders (American band), a 1950s R&B group
- The Spiders (American rock band), a 1960s American rock band, later known as Alice Cooper
- The Spiders (Japanese band), a 1960s Japanese Group Sounds band

==== Albums ====
- Spiders (album), a 1996 album by Space
- Spiderr, a 2022 album by Bladee

==== Songs ====
- "Spider", a song by Bo Burnham from the 2022 The Inside Outtakes
- "Spider", a song by Oingo Boingo on the 1994 album Boingo
- "Spider", a single by Spitz
- "Spider", a song by The Vapors on the 1981 album Magnets
- "Spider", a song by They Might Be Giants on the 1992 album Apollo 18
- "Spiders" (Destine song), 2010
- "Spiders" (Moby song), 2005
- "Spiders" (System of a Down song), 1999
- "Spiders", a song by Slipknot on the 2019 album We Are Not Your Kind
- "Spiders", a song by Editors on the 2007 album An End Has a Start
- "Spiders (Kidsmoke)", a song by Wilco on the 2004 album A Ghost Is Born
- "The Spider", a song by Kansas on the 1997 album Point of Know Return
- "The Spider", a song by Scottish musician Momus on the 2015 album Turpsycore
- "Spider" (Gims song), 2024

=== Periodicals ===
- Spider (computer magazine), a monthly magazine in Karachi, Pakistan
- Spider (magazine), a children's literary magazine
- The Spider (magazine), a pulp magazine published from 1933 to 1943

=== Other uses in arts, entertainment and media ===
- Spider (Bourgeois), a sculpture by Louise Bourgeois
- Spider! (TV series), a 1991 musical children's television miniseries
- The Spiders (comic), a webcomic by Patrick S. Farley
- "Spider", a 2005 episode of the animated television series 12 oz. Mouse

== Military ==
- 4th Guards Brigade "Spiders", a former Croatian army unit
- Light Strike Vehicle (Singapore), or Spider New Generation
- SS-23 Spider, a ballistic missile

== People ==
- Spider (nickname), a list of people
- John Koerner (born 1938), American blues/folk musician known as Spider
- Spider Robinson (born 1948), American-Canadian science-fiction writer
- Ben Spider (born 1970), Franco-Swiss artist
- Spider (musician) (born 1999/2000), Irish musician
- The Spider, ring name for professional wrestler Randy Savage (1952–2011)
- The Spider, professional wrestler from United States Wrestling Association

== Places ==
- Spider, Kentucky, U.S.
- Spider crater, Western Australia
- The Spider (Colorado), a mountain in the Gore Range
- "The Spider", another name for the Pantheon Fossae surface formation on Mercury
- ¨Las Arañas, lit. "The Spiders":
  - Las Arañas, Santiago Metropolitan Region
  - Las Arañas, O'Higgins Region

== Science and technology ==
- Spider (polarimeter), an experiment to study the cosmic microwave background radiation
- Apollo 9 lunar module (callsign "Spider")
- Spider, a support for the secondary mirror of a reflecting telescope
- Spider, a component of a loudspeaker
- AMD Spider, a computer platform
- 45 rpm adapter, called the spider, for a phonograph record
- Web spider, another name for a web crawler — an Internet bot that systematically browses the World Wide Web for purposes of web indexing — typically employed by search engines
- Spectral phase interferometry for direct electric-field reconstruction, an ultrashort pulse measurement technique
- Spider wrap, a type of electronic article surveillance tag
- Spider wrench, a x-shaped Lug wrench
- Tubing spider, a heavy duty gripping tool used in oil drilling for securing the drill pipe to the drill floor
- SPIDER, a prototype negative ion source for the ITER Heating Neutral Beams

== Sports ==
- Spider, a piece of snooker equipment
- Cleveland Spiders, an 1887–1899 American baseball team
- Richmond Spiders, the sports teams of the University of Richmond
- San Francisco Spiders, a 1996 American hockey team
- The Spiders, an early ring name for professional wrestling tag-team The Headbangers
- The Spiders, nickname of Queen's Park F.C., Glasgow

== Transportation ==
=== Cars ===
- Various Alfa Romeo models:
  - Alfa Romeo Spider (916), a roadster version of the Alfa Romeo Brera produced from 2006 to 2010
  - Alfa Romeo Spider (939), a roadster sports car produced from 1993 to 2004
  - Alfa Romeo Spider, a sports car introduced in 1966
- Bovensiepen Spider, a roadster
- Aston Martin Valkyrie Spider, a convertible version of the Aston Martin Valkyrie sports car
- Fiat 124 Sport Spider, also known as the Pininfarina Spider, a sports car produced 1966–1980
- Fiat 124 Spider (2016), a sports car introduced in 2016
- McLaren MP4-12C Spider, a convertible version of the McLaren MP4-12C sports car
- Renault Sport Spider, a sports car produced 1996–1999

=== Other uses in transportation ===
- Spider (locomotive), a 1890 locomotive on the Marrawah Tramway, Tasmania, Australia
- Pipistrel Spider, a Slovenian ultralight trike aircraft design
- Spider, part of a bicycle crankset

== Other uses ==
- Spider (portal) (Strathclyde Personal Interactive Development and Educational Resource)
- SPDR, pronounced "spider", a family of investment funds
- Spider (utensil), a basket with a long handle
- Spider, a type of frying pan with legs
- Spider, a type of ice cream float (a beverage)

== See also ==
- SPDR (disambiguation)
- Spyder (disambiguation)
- Arana (disambiguation), La Araña (disambiguation), and Las Arañas (disambiguation), terms referring to Spanish translations of spiders
