= Las Arañas =

Las arañas is the Spanish translation for "spiders".

Las Arañas may also refer to:

- Las Arañas, Santiago Metropolitan Region, a hamlet in Chile
- Las Arañas, O'Higgins Region, a village in Chile
- Las Arañas, a fictional tribe in the 2024 superhero film Madame Web

== See also ==
- Arana (disambiguation)
- La Araña (disambiguation)
- Las Arenas
- Las Arenas (Cabrales)
- Las Ranas (disambiguation)
