= Rock spider =

Rock spider or rockspider may refer to:

- In South African slang, an Afrikaner (derogatory)
- In Australian prison slang, a child molester
- Caladenia petrensis, the rock spider orchid
- Rockspider, a 1999 true crime book by Vikki Petraitis

== See also ==
- Spider Rock, a feature in Canyon de Chelly National Monument
- Rock (disambiguation)
- Spider (disambiguation)
