= Bovensiepen (disambiguation) =

Bovensiepen may refer to:

- Bovensiepen family, a German family name, notably associated with business and industry
- Otto Bovensiepen (1905–1979), German lawyer and Gestapo police official
- Alpina Burkard Bovensiepen GmbH & Co. KG; commonly known as Alpina, a German automobile manufacturing company founded by Burkard Bovensiepen, specializing in high-performance vehicles based on BMW models
- Bovensiepen Zagato, a car model
