= Bulnes Funicular =

Underground funicular in Picos de Europa, Asturias, Spain

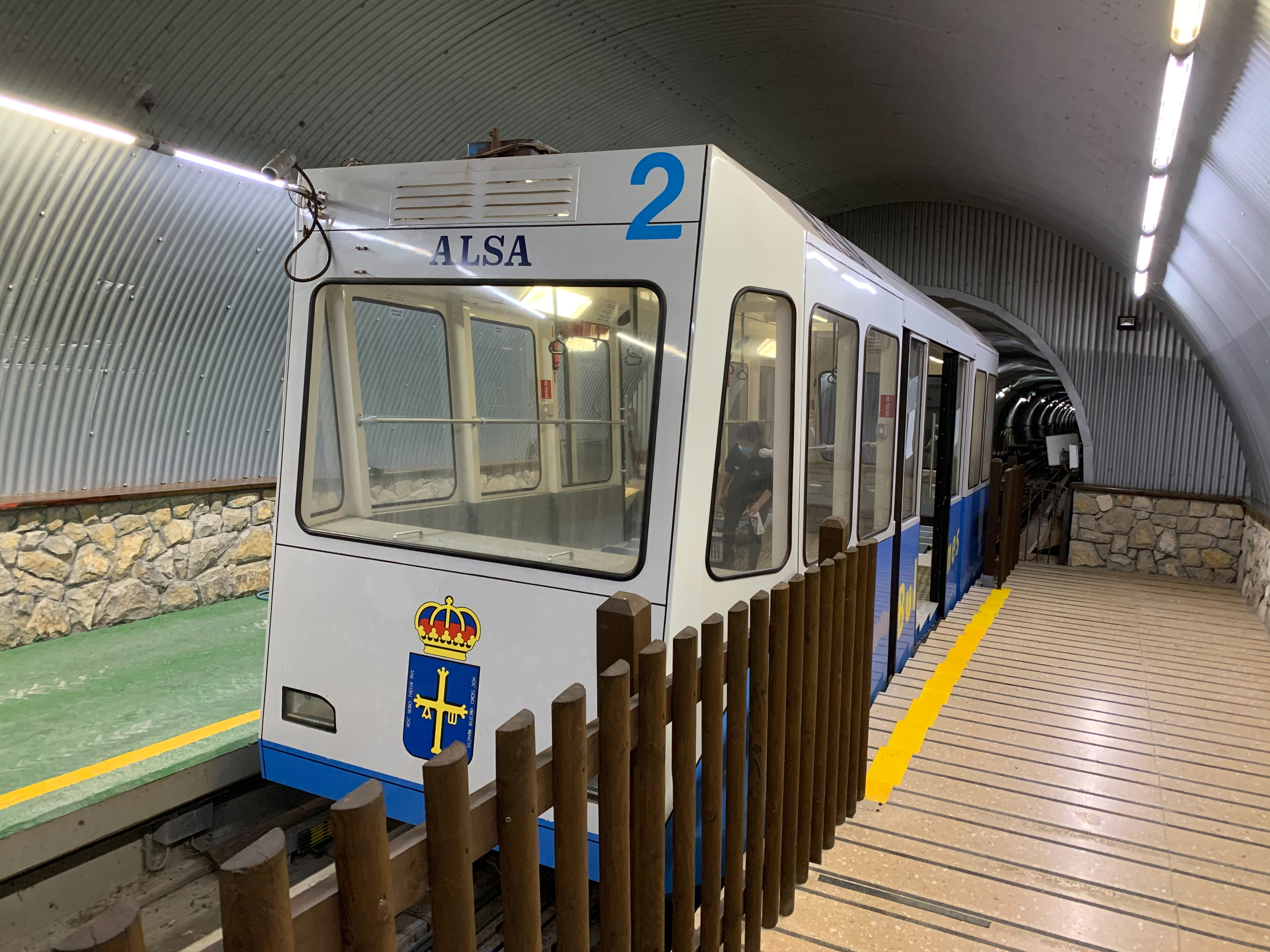

Overview
- Locale: Cabrales, Asturias, Spain
- Termini: Poncebos; Bulnes

Service
- Type: Funicular

History
- Opened: 2001

Technical
- Track length: 2.23 km (1.39 mi)
- Track gauge: metre gauge
- Operating speed: 18 km/h (11 mph)
- Maximum incline: 18.19%

The Bulnes Funicular (Spanish: Funicular de Bulnes) is an underground funicular connecting the villages of Bulnes and Poncebos in the Picos de Europa region of the Cantabrian Mountains in Asturias, Spain.

== Overview ==
The village of Bulnes is located at an elevation of 650 m (2,130 ft) in a steep mountain valley above the Cares River. Traditionally, the only routes to the village were the strenuous two-hour trail from Poncebos and the mountain path from Sotres. There are no vehicular routes to the village. To provide better access to Bulnes and to open up the region to tourism, the Asturias government developed the Bulnes Funicular which opened in September 2001. In the first 10 years after opening, the funicular recorded 500,000 passengers.

The funicular is a single-track railway with an 18% slope that operates through a tunnel below the mountains north of Bulnes. The railway has an elevation gain of 402 m (1,319 ft) from its base in Poncebos to the terminus in Bulnes. There are no other stations along the route.

There are two passenger cars for the funicular, with total capacity of 48 passengers, in addition to a freight car that is used to transport goods to Bulnes. The funicular operates 365 days a year and departs at 30 minute intervals. Fares are collected to use the funicular, except for residents of Bulnes who can travel for free.

== Gallery ==
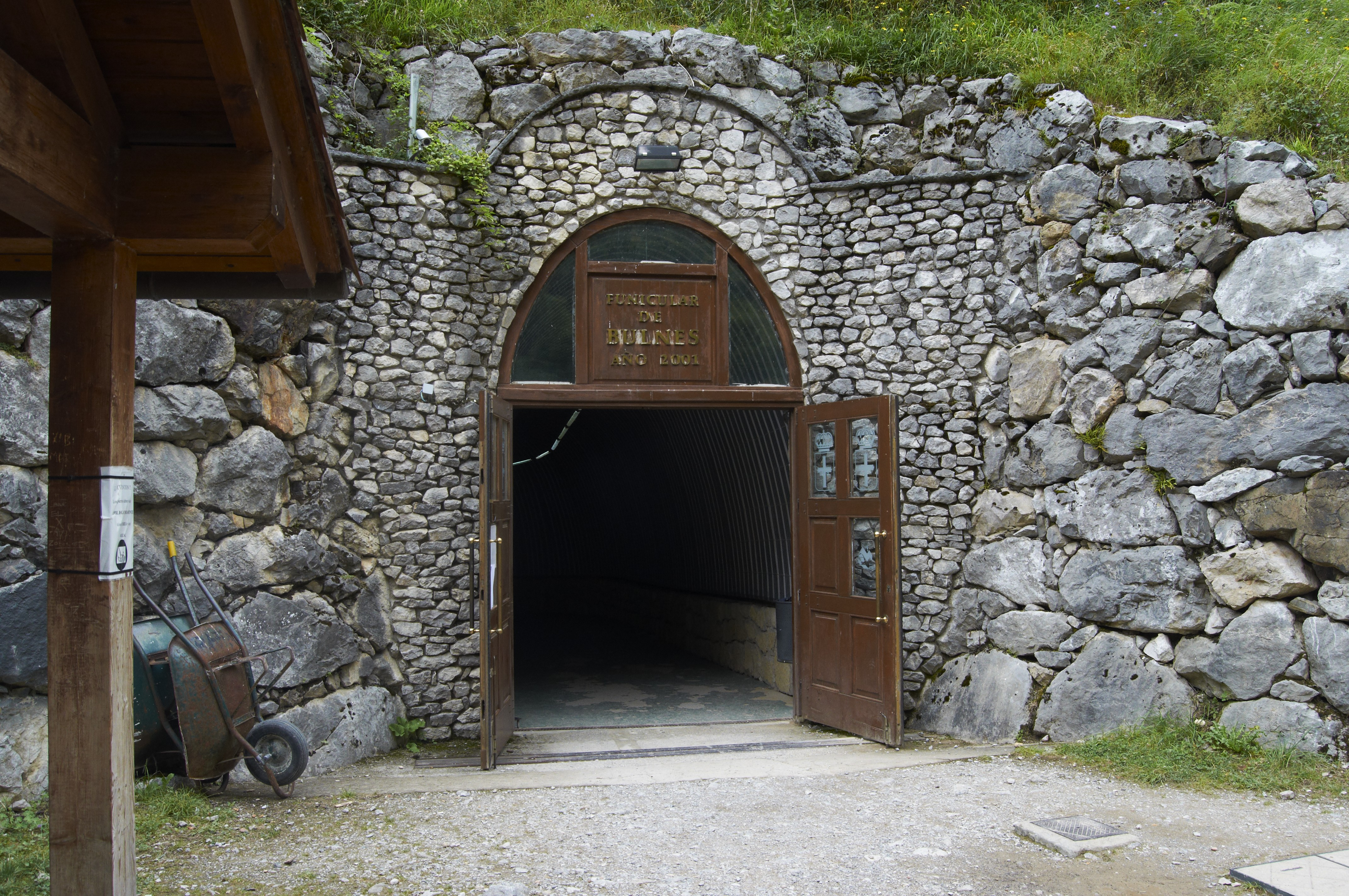
Entrance to the funicular station

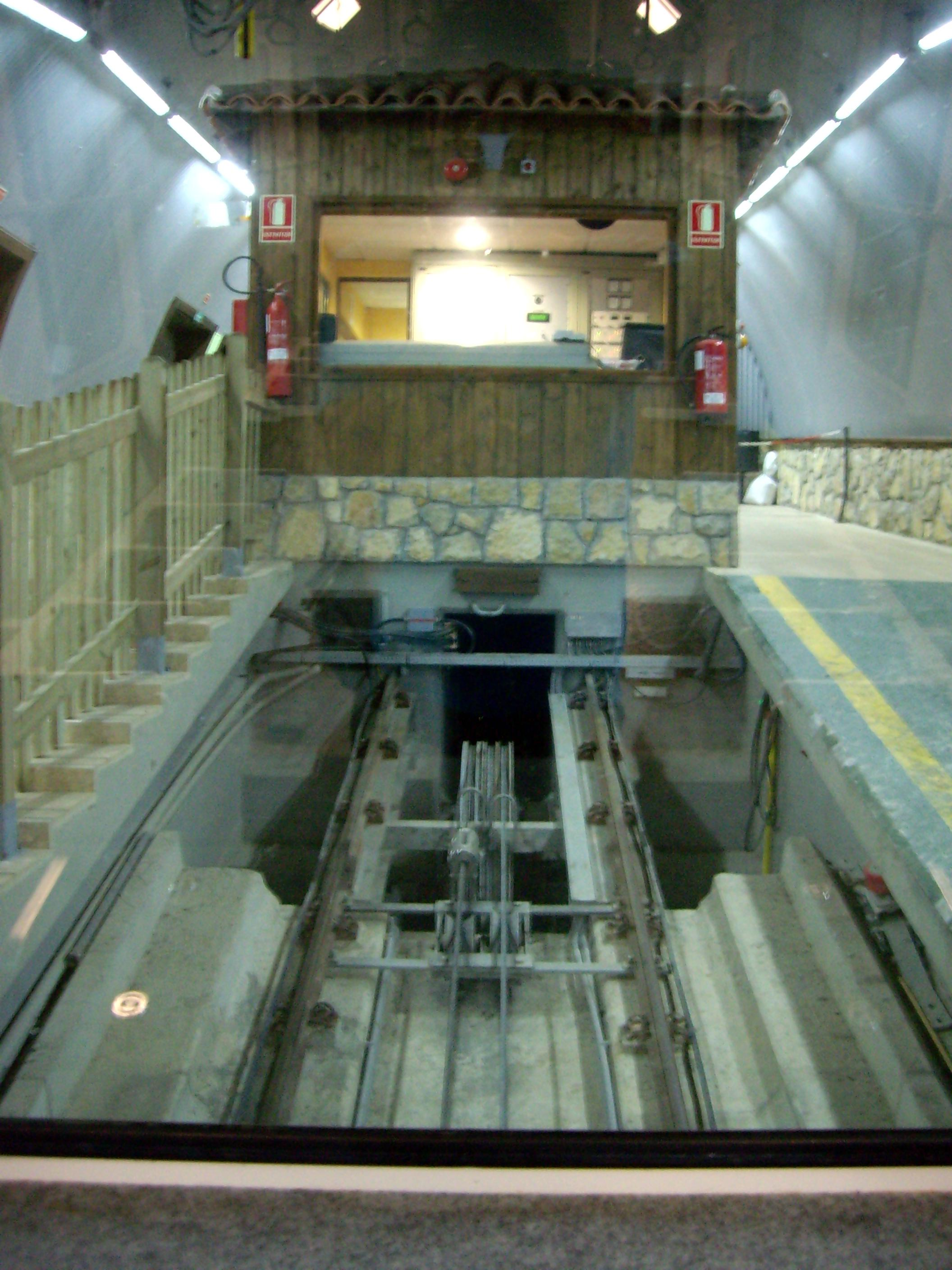
View of the terminus in Bulnes

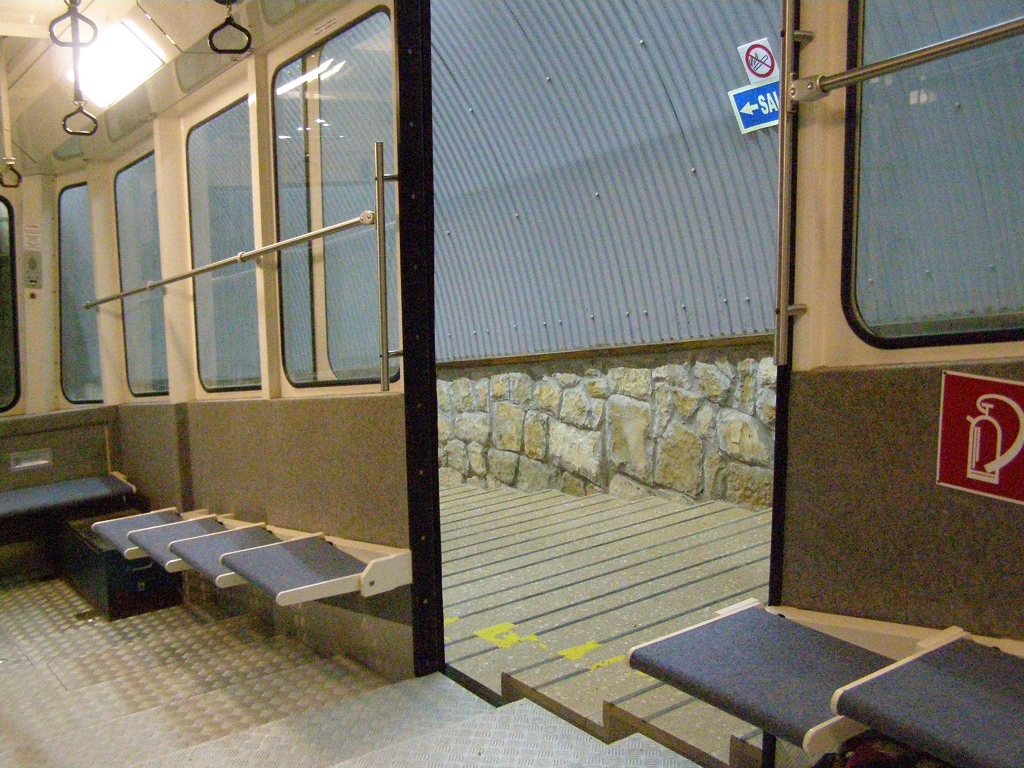
Interior of the Bulnes Funicular
