= Díaz Inguanzo Palace =

Coordinates: 43.3099°N 4.8780°W

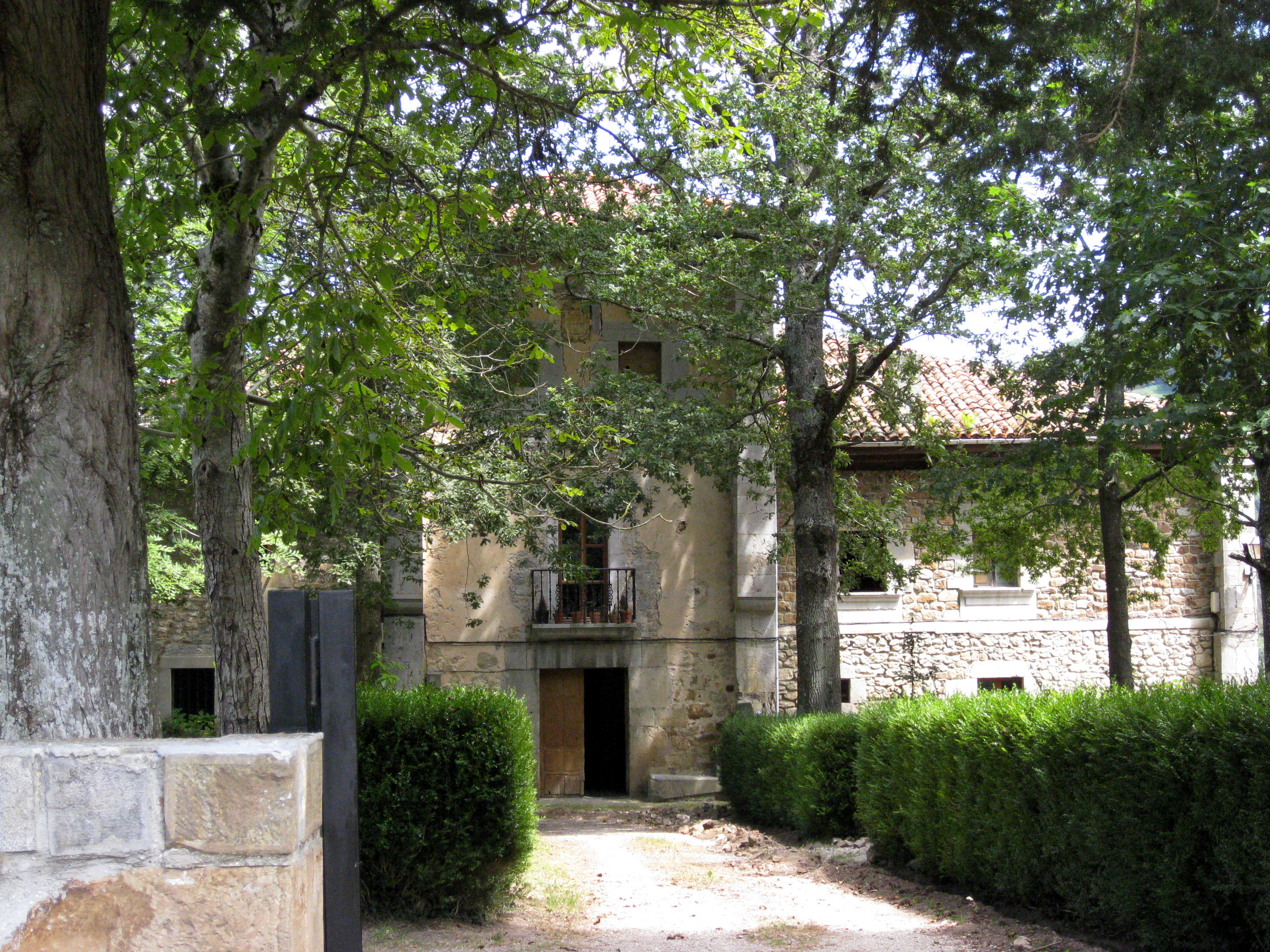
Palacio de Díaz Inguanzo

Díaz Inguanzo Palace (also known as Palacio de la Torre or The Palace of the Tower) is located in the parish of Berodia, in the municipality of Cabrales, in Asturias, Spain. The palace is in a valley, near the Iglesia de Sta. María Magdalena (Church of Mary Magdalene) and a few hundred meters from the town.

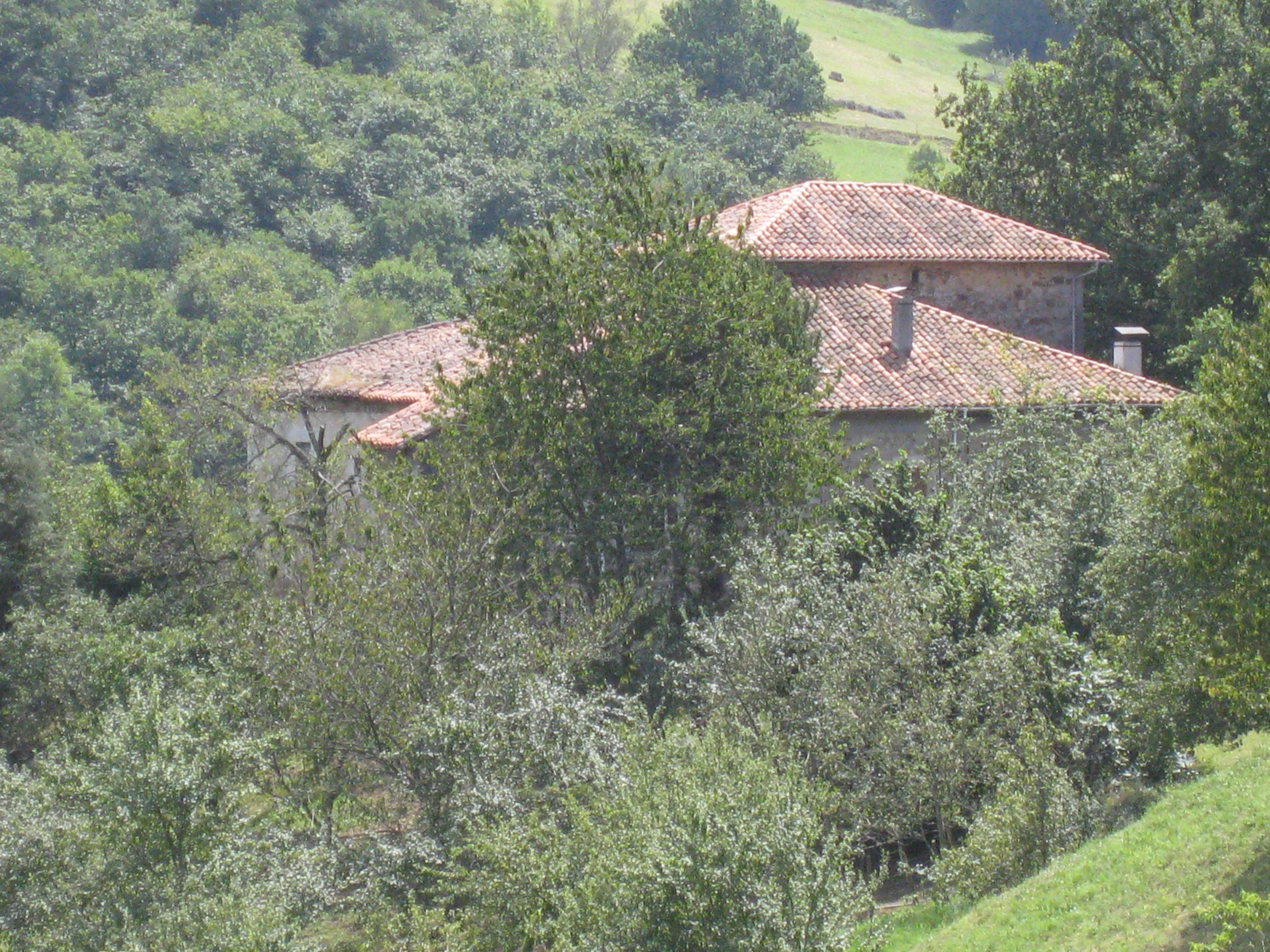
Palacio de Díaz Inguanzo

The building has a three-story central tower flanked by two symmetrically sized two-story sections. The central tower has a hipped roof, with paired window openings and situated at the top is a shield bearing the Inguanzo family crest. On the ground floor, a balcony overhangs the door. The lintel of the door is embossed with the date 1898.

The two sections on either side of the tower are not symmetrical in appearance. The right hand side has tall windows between the two floors, but these are not in evidence on the left side. The palace houses an antique cider press.

Since 1994, the palace has been designated as a historic monument.
