= Spyder =

Spyder may refer to:

== Arts and media ==
- Spyder, a minor Myth Adventures character
- Spyder (film), a 2017 Indian film directed by A. R. Murugadoss, starring Mahesh Babu
  - Spyder (soundtrack), its soundtrack by Harris Jayaraj
- Spyder Games, an MTV television series
- "Spyder", a 1996 Imperial Drag song off their album Imperial Drag
- SPYDER, the villain in the book series Spy School by Stuart Gibbs
- Spyder (video game), an adventure video game that was developed by Sumo Digital for iOS, iPadOS, macOS, and tvOS.

== Automotive ==
- Roadster (automobile), a type of car
- Several cars made by Porsche:
  - Porsche 550 Spyder, a very successful race car from the 1950s
  - Porsche RS Spyder, a Le Mans Prototype race car from 2005-2010, named in tribute to the Porsche 550 Spyder
  - Porsche 918 Spyder, a high performance plug-in hybrid road car from 2013-2015
  - Porsche 718 Spyder (previously named the Porsche Boxster Spyder), mid-engine road car from 2019-2024
- Chevrolet Corvair Monza Spyder, a turbocharged version of the Chevrolet Corvair
- Chevrolet Monza Spyder, a performance package version of the 1975–1980 subcompact, four-passenger automobile
- Lamborghini Gallardo Spyder, a production model of the Lamborghini Gallardo
- Mitsubishi 3000GT Spyder, a 2-door hard top convertible version of the Mitsubishi 3000 GT
- Mitsubishi Eclipse Spyder, a 2-door convertible version of the Mitsubishi Eclipse
- BRP Can-Am Spyder Roadster, a three-wheeled motor vehicle manufactured by Can-Am
- Toyota Spyder, a convertible sold in the United States
- Maserati Spyder, a grand tourer

== People ==
- Spyder Turner (born 1947), American soul singer
- Spyder Jonez, screen name of pornographic actor Evan Seinfeld
- Joe "Spyder" Lester, current bassist for the American rock band Steel Panther

== Technology ==
- SPYDER, an anti-aircraft missile-system
- Spyder (software), an open-source IDE for the Python programming-language
- Spyder, codename for the Motorola Droid Razr, an Android smartphone
- Spyder, a satellite launch vehicle developed by UP Aerospace

== Other uses ==
- Spyder (ski apparel brand)
- Spyder, a brand of paintball markers and other related equipment
- Spyder, a former alternative name for the Klobb

== See also ==
- Spider (disambiguation)
- SPDR (disambiguation)
