= Arana =

Arana may refer to:

== Places ==
- Arana Hills, Queensland, a suburb in Moreton Bay Region, Queensland, Australia
- Sierra Arana, a mountain range in the province of Granada, Spain
- Harana/Valle de Arana, a valley and municipality in the southeast of Álava
- Arranah, a village in Jenin Governorate, Palestinian National Authority
- Arana Gulch, in Santa Cruz, California, United States
- Cuevas de la Araña, caves in eastern Spain

== Other uses ==
- Arana (surname)
- Araña, code name used by fictional character Anya Corazon, a Marvel Comics superheroine who later used the codename Spider-Girl
- Arana language, a member of the Krenak languages
- Arana College, a residential college of the University of Otago
- Arana–Lepredour Treaty, between Argentina and France
- Arana–Southern Treaty, between Argentina and the United Kingdom
- La Araña, nickname of Roberto Vásquez, a Panamanian professional boxer
- Operation Araña, a Spanish law enforcement operation
- TR Araña, a robot

== People with the given name Arana ==
- Arana Taumata (born 1989), New Zealand rugby league player

== See also ==
- Aranäs, the name of at least two locations in southern Sweden
- La Araña (disambiguation) and Las Arañas (disambiguation), terms referring to Spanish translations of spiders
- Arano (disambiguation)
