= SPDR (disambiguation) =

SPDR may refer to:

- SPDR funds, exchange-traded funds
  - Standard & Poor's Depositary Receipts, an exchange-traded fund
- System Peril Distributed Reflex, in the game I Love Bees

== See also ==
- Spyder (disambiguation)
- Spider (disambiguation)
- Speeder (disambiguation)
