= Poo (Cabrales) =

Place in Cabrales

Coordinates: 43°18′28″N 4°50′07″W

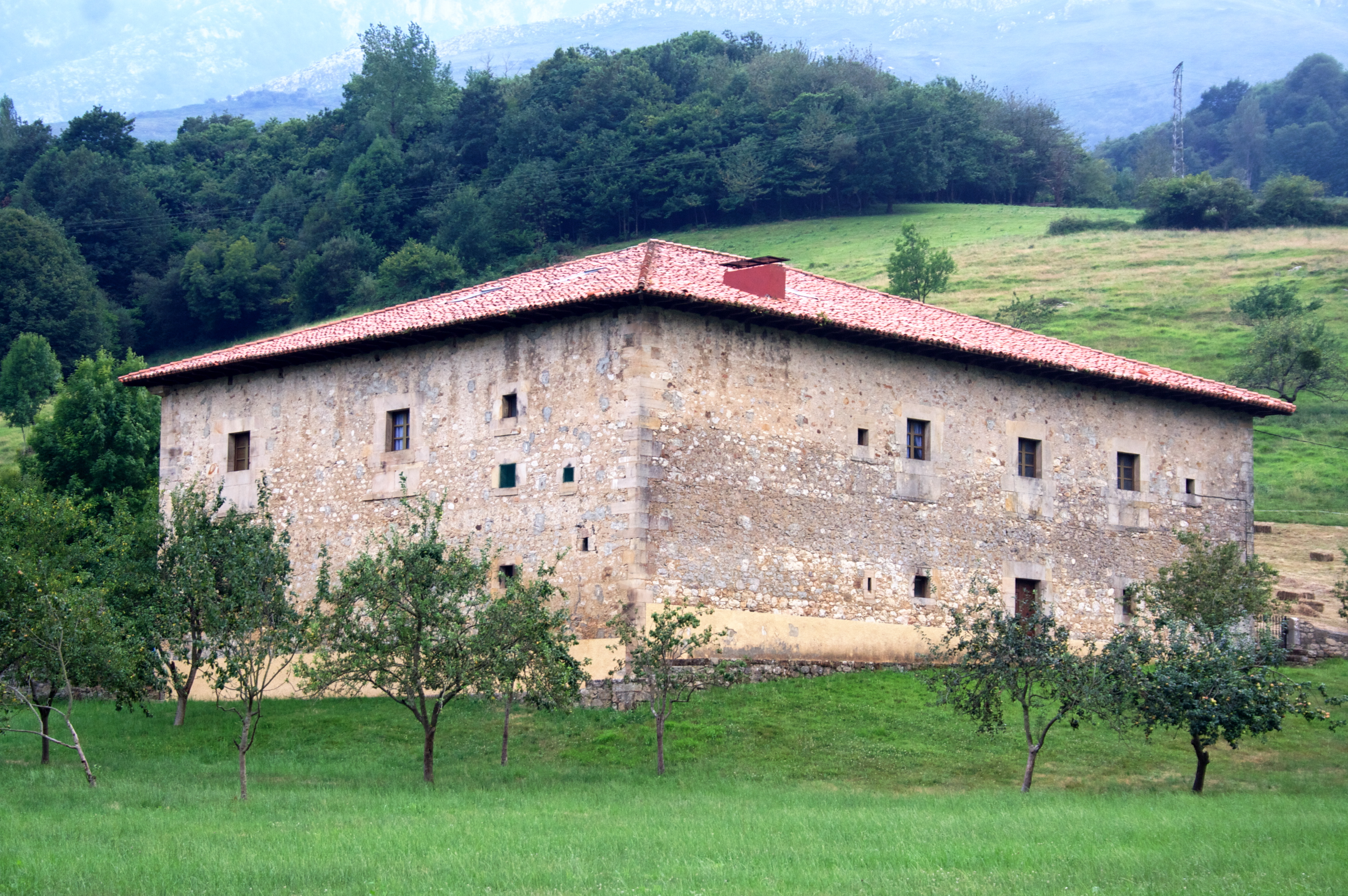
Home in Poo, Cabrales, Asturias

Poo is one of nine parroquias in Cabrales, a municipality of the autonomous community of Asturias, in northern Spain. It has an area of 10.28 km^{2}, and a population of 214 (INE 2015) all in the same settlement. Poo is located 158 meters above sea level. It lies 1.5 km from Carreña, the capital of Cabrales.
