= Sotres =

Coordinates: 43.230°N 4.750°W

- Parish
- Interactive map of Sotres
- Country: Spain
- Autonomous community: Asturias
- Province: Asturias
- Municipality: Cabrales

Population
  - Total: 130

Sotres is a village and parish in the Asturian municipality of Cabrales, in Spain, located 19 km from Carreña, the municipal capital, in the eastern extreme of the province.

The highest of all villages in the Picos de Europa National Park, it is part of the designated Biosphere Reserve and is sheltered by the peaks of the Andara (eastern) Massif and the Central Massif of the Picos de Europa, as well as the slopes of Pena Maín. It covers a land area of 38,1 km^{2} and has a resident population of just 130 (INE 2011) that is almost outnumbered in summer by guests of the village's hostals.

The village is linked to the European GR footpath network, being the arrival point of the GR-71 route known as the "Path of the Saja Nature Reserve" that begins in Corconte in Cantabria and traverses the hills and valleys of the province. Now better known as a base for eco-tourism, Sotres has retained much of its agricultural identity and is one of the key producers of Queso de Cabrales, the blue cheese matured in the many limestone caves present in the surrounding mountains.

Like much of Asturias and rural Spain in general, Sotres has experienced significant depopulation since the early 1970s. As a result, construction of the Park's first ski resort at San Glorio, which met with considerable opposition from conservation groups, has been largely supported by villagers who see it as a much needed boost to the area's dynamism, and a new mountaintop road from Sotres to the resort has already been approved by the Asturias regional government.

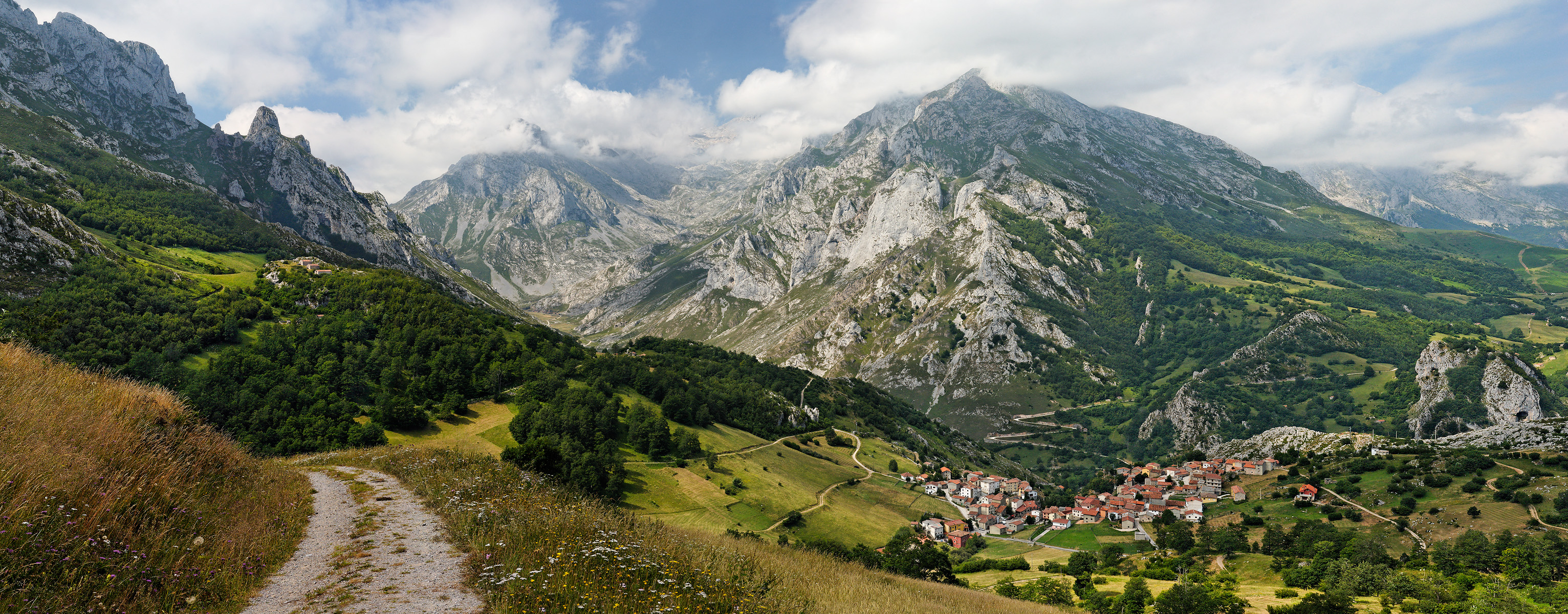
The peaks of the central massif overlooking the village of Sotres

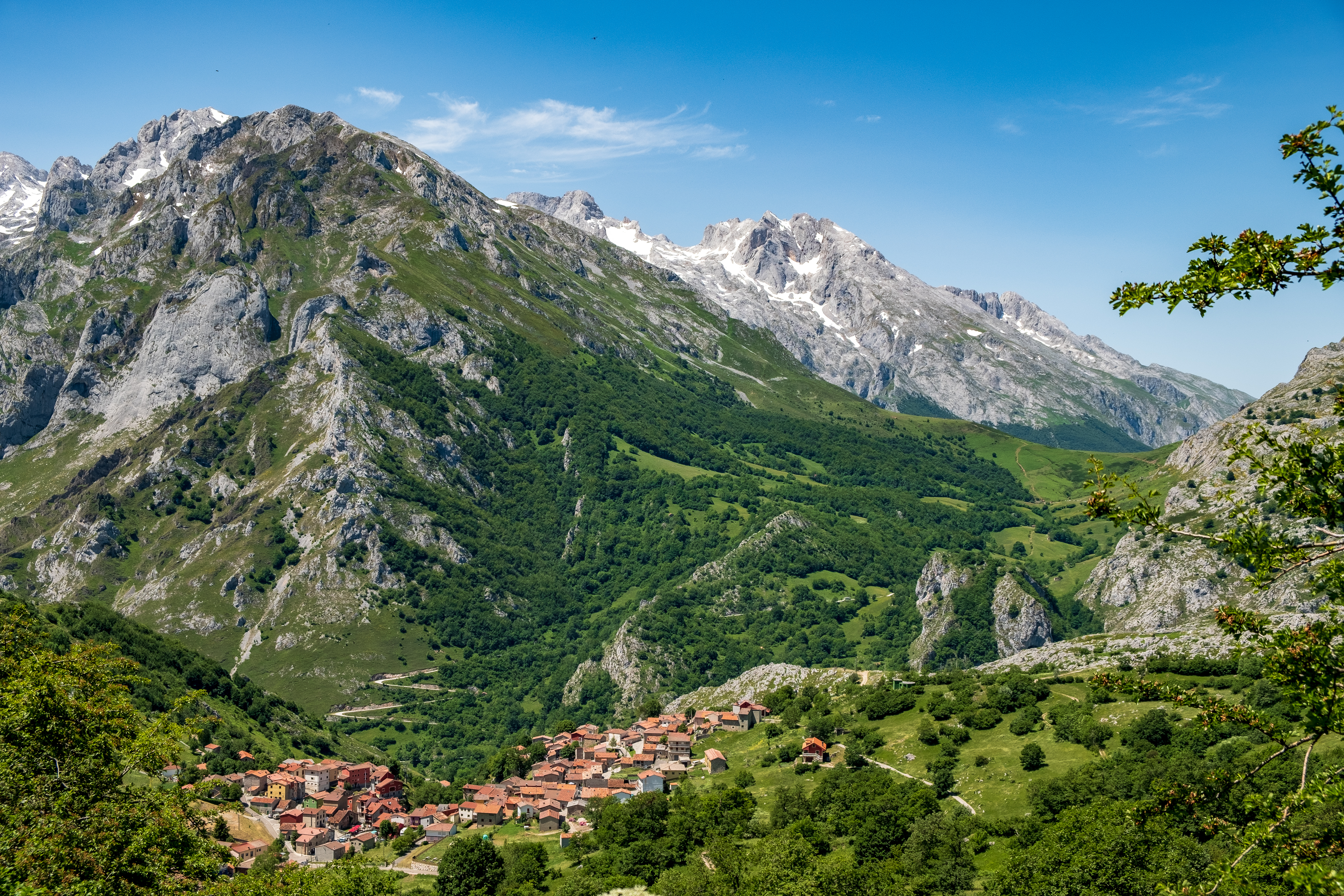
Sotres with the Picos de Europa National Park in the background as is seen in Summer
