= Berodia =

- Parish
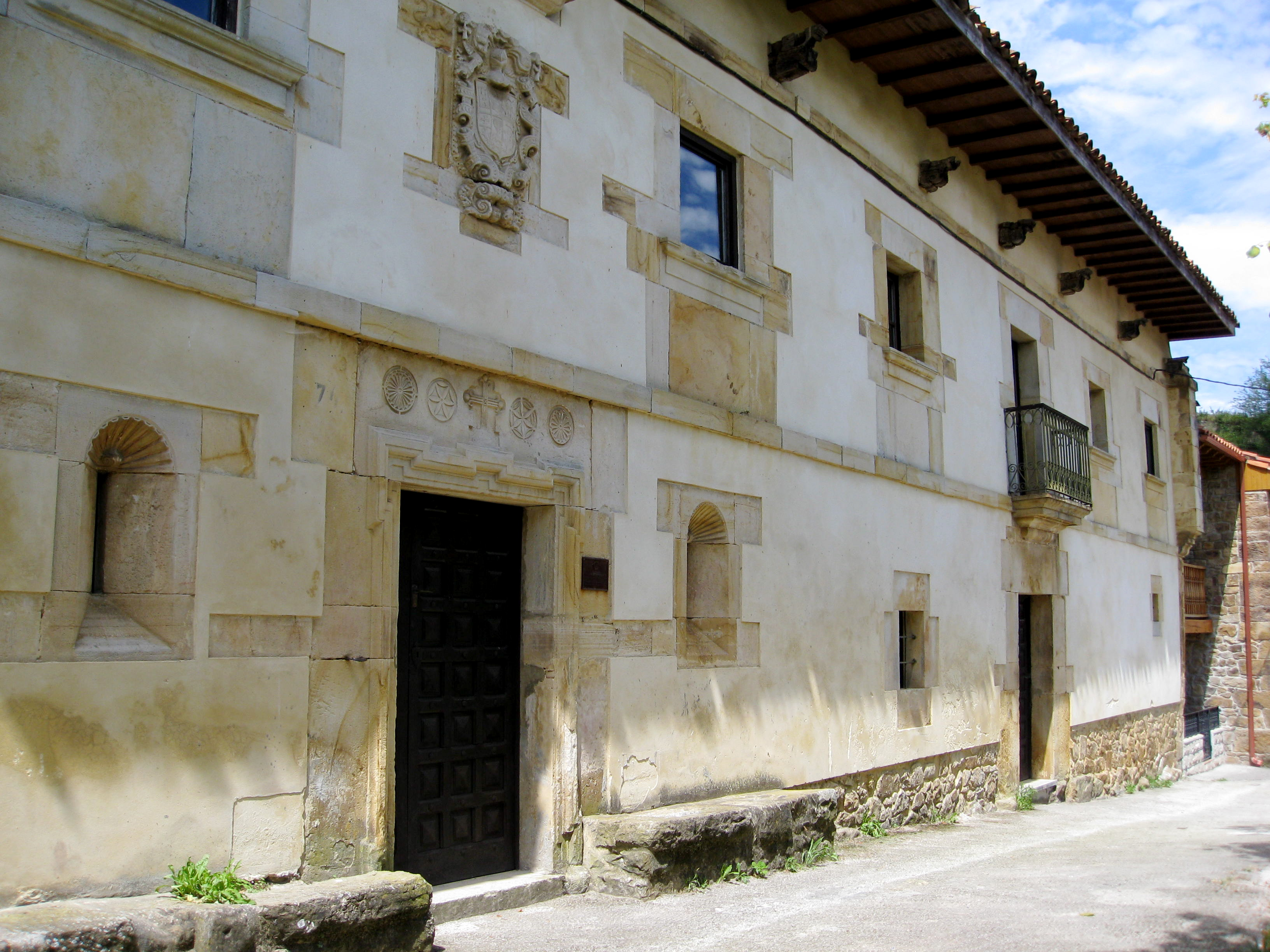
- Mayorazgo Palace in Iguanzo, parish Berodia

- Location within Spain
- Coordinates: 43°19′N 4°53′W
- Country: Spain
- Autonomous community: Asturias
- Province: Asturias
- Municipality: Cabrales

Population (2023)
  - Total: 148

Berodia is one of nine parishes in Cabrales, a municipality within the province and autonomous community of Asturias, in northern Spain. It is 13.51 km^{2} (5.22 sq mi) in size, with a population of 148 as of 2023. The parish consists of two villages, Berodia and Inguanzo.

The Díaz Inguanzo Palace, also called the Palacio de la Torre, is located in a valley near the Iglesia de Sta. María Magdalena (Church of Mary Magdalene), a few hundred meters from town. The palace was designated as a historic monument in 1994 and is on the list of Bienes de Interés Cultural.

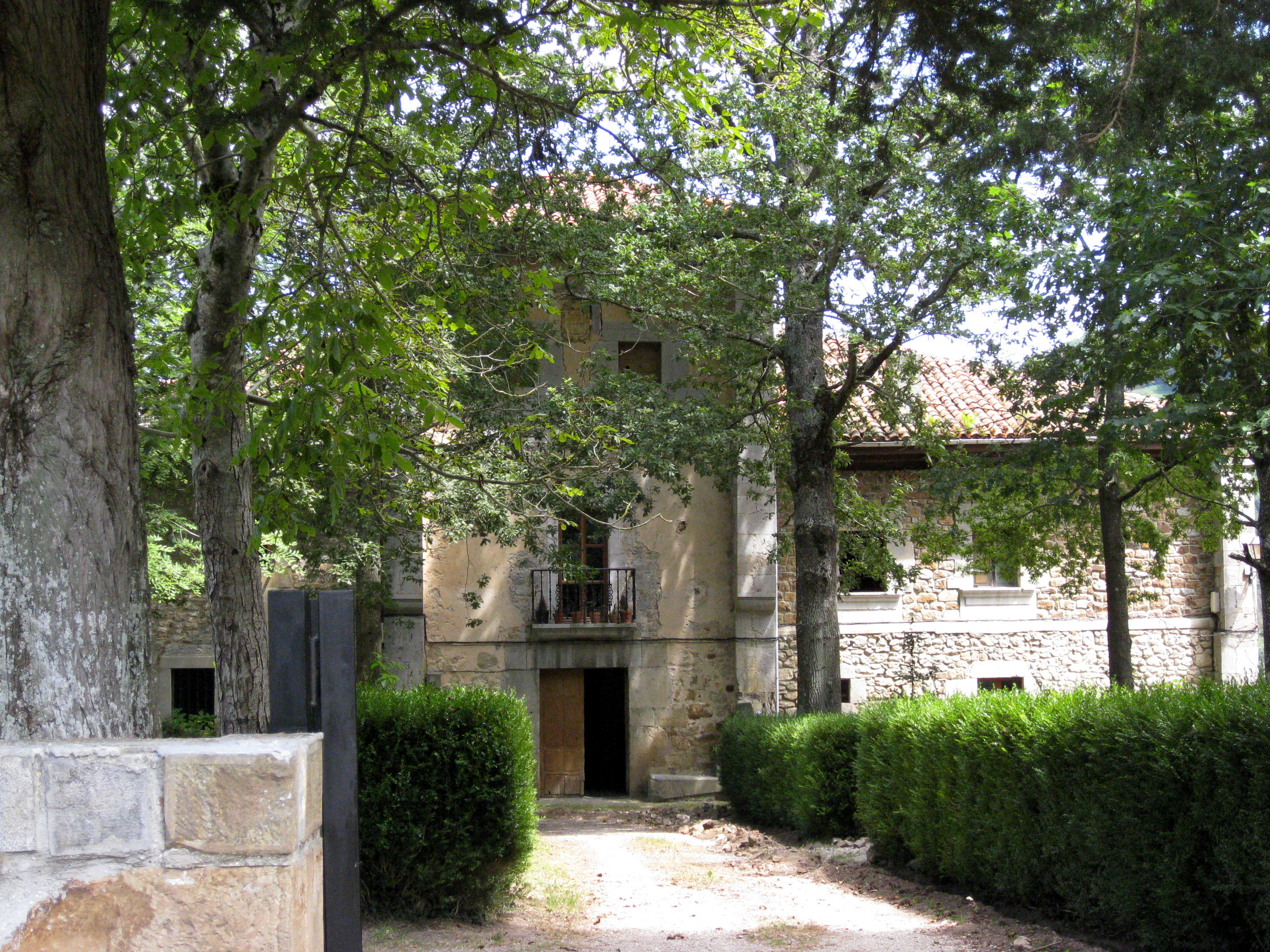
Palacio de Díaz Inguanzo
