= Bovensiepen (company) =

German sports car manufacturer

Bovensiepen Automobile GmbH
- Type: Private
- Industry: Automotive
- Founded: 2025
- Founder: Andreas Bovensiepen
- Headquarters: Buchloe, Bavaria, Germany
- Products: Automobiles
- Website: www.bovensiepen.com/en/

Bovensiepen Automobile GmbH is a German car manufacturer headquartered in Buchloe. Formed in 2025, the company develops and sells high-performance versions of BMW cars under the Bovensiepen brand.

== History ==
In May 2025, during the prestigious annual Concorso d'Eleganza Villa d'Este event, the inauguration of Bovensiepen took place, a new company of the German family named after that family, previously known for the BMW company Alpina sold in 2022. The first product, dubbed the Bovensiepen Zagato, was a luxury-sports coupe developed in cooperation with the Italian design studio Zagato, which was responsible for the styling of the model named in its honor. Despite being a twin of the BMW 4 Series, the car gained its own, distinct styling.

In June 2026, Bovensiepen presented its second car, this time departing from the concept of a small-scale sports car, which received a unique design in collaboration with an external design studio. Instead, the large 05 GT station wagon was de facto only a slightly modified eighth-generation BMW M5 in a 5-door variant. In September 2026, Bovensiepen presented its third car, the Bovensiepen Spider, which based on the BMW Z4 (G29) and limited to 99 units.

== Products ==
- Bovensiepen 05 GT
- Bovensiepen Spider
- Bovensiepen Zagato
