= Santolaya (Cabrales) =

- Parish
- Location within Spain
- Country: Spain
- Autonomous community: Asturias
- Province: Asturias
- Municipality: Cabrales

Population
  - Total: 137

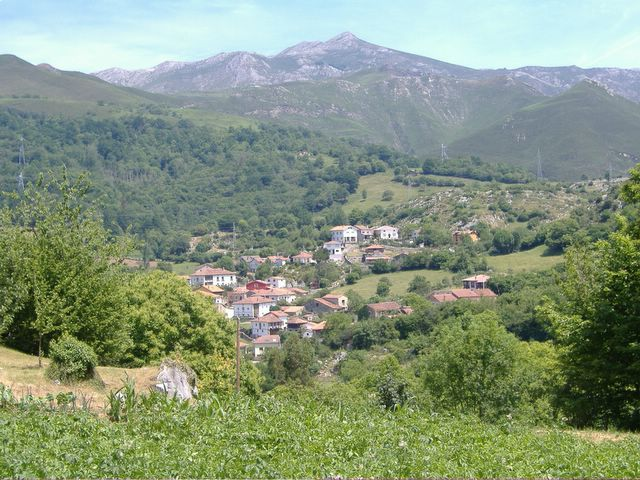
Puertas

Santolaya is one of nine parishes (administrative divisions) in Cabrales, a municipality within the province and autonomous community of Asturias, in northern Spain.

It is 15.93 km^{2} (6.15 sq mi) in size with a population of 137 (INE 2011).

== Villages ==
- L’escobal
- Pandiellu
- Puertas
