= Tielve =

- Parish
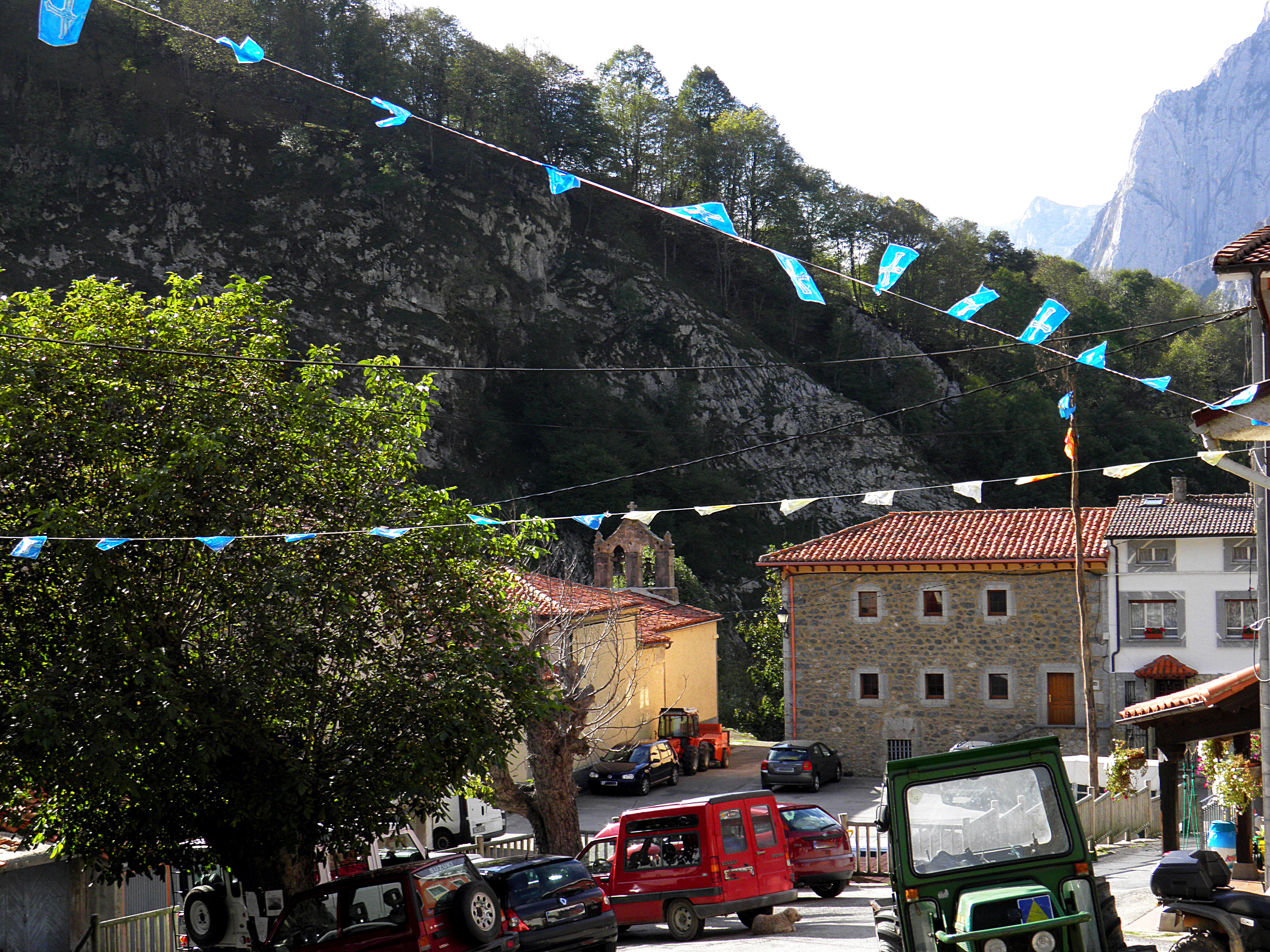

- Location within Spain
- Country: Spain
- Autonomous community: Asturias
- Province: Asturias
- Municipality: Cabrales

Population
  - Total: 72

Tielve is one of nine parishes (administrative divisions) in Cabrales, a municipality within the province and autonomous community of Asturias, in northern Spain.

The altitude is 685 m (2,247 ft) above sea level. It is 43.15 km^{2} (16.66 sq mi) in size with a population of 72 (INE 2011). The postal code is 33554. The parish has one village.

== Hamlets ==
- Catruche
- El Caleru
- El Catalinariu
- El Colladín
- El Cuadru
- El Cárabu
- El Molín de Saleras
- El Piplón
- El Praducu
- El Puelu Baju
  - El Cantón
  - El Pontigu
  - La Calle Tras
  - La Salgareda
  - La Ḥontina
- L'Entelhorru
- La Bolera
- La Calle Mediu
- La Casa la Cruz
- La Cortina
- La Escuela
- La Retoral
- La Riega
- La Ḥuente
- Las Adras
- Las Vegas
- Llorea
- Los Cuarteles
- Socampu
