= San Roque (Cabrales) =

- Parish
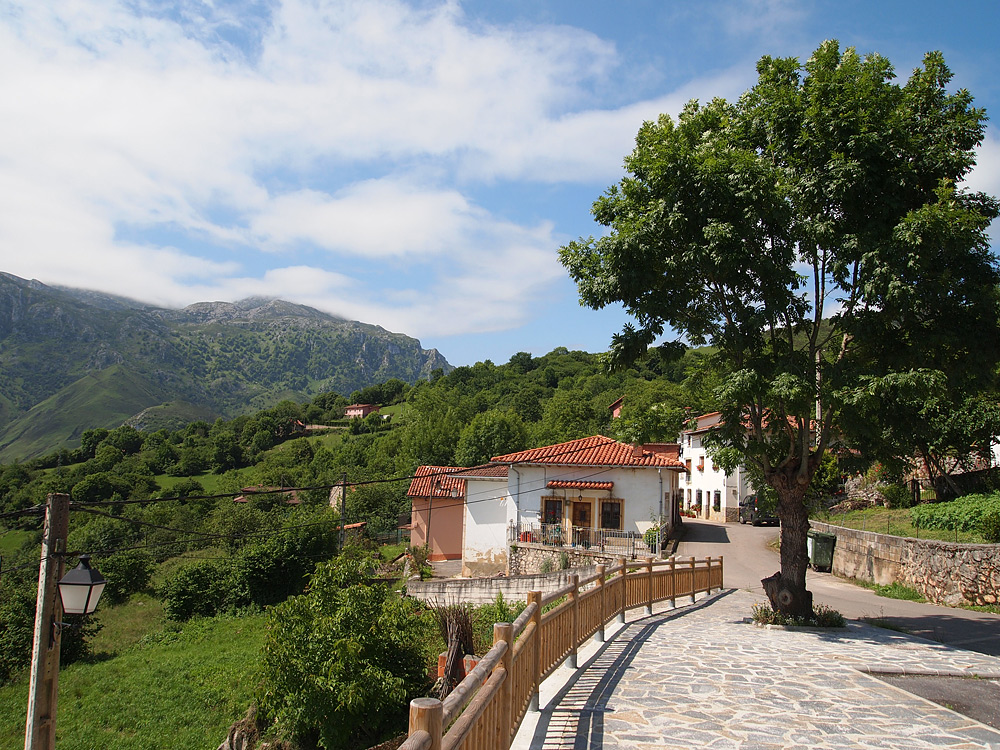

- Location within Spain
- Country: Spain
- Autonomous community: Asturias
- Province: Asturias
- Municipality: Cabrales

Population
  - Total: 199

San Roque is one of nine parishes (administrative divisions) in Cabrales, a municipality on the province and autonomous community of Asturias, in northern Spain near the Picos de Europa mountains.

The altitude is 441 m (1,447 ft) above sea level. It is 20.87 km^{2} (8.06 sq mi) in size with a population of 199 (INE 2011). The postal code is 33555.

== Villages ==
- Canales
- La Molina
- Ḥortigueru
- La Salce
