= Snow-speeder =

Snow-speeder, snow speeder, or snowspeeder may refer to:

- snow-speeder, another name for a snowmobile
- sno-speeder, a type of downhill sled/toboggan with a steerable front ski and pair of rear runner
- Snowspeeder, fictional flying vehicle, see list of Star Wars air, aquatic, and ground vehicles
- スノースピーダー (lit. Snow Speeder), Japanese videogame, released to North America as Big Mountain 2000
- Snowspeeder, a fictional ground vehicle from the 2008 film One-Eyed Monster

== See also ==
- Speeder (disambiguation)
