= Las Arenas (Cabrales) =

- Parish
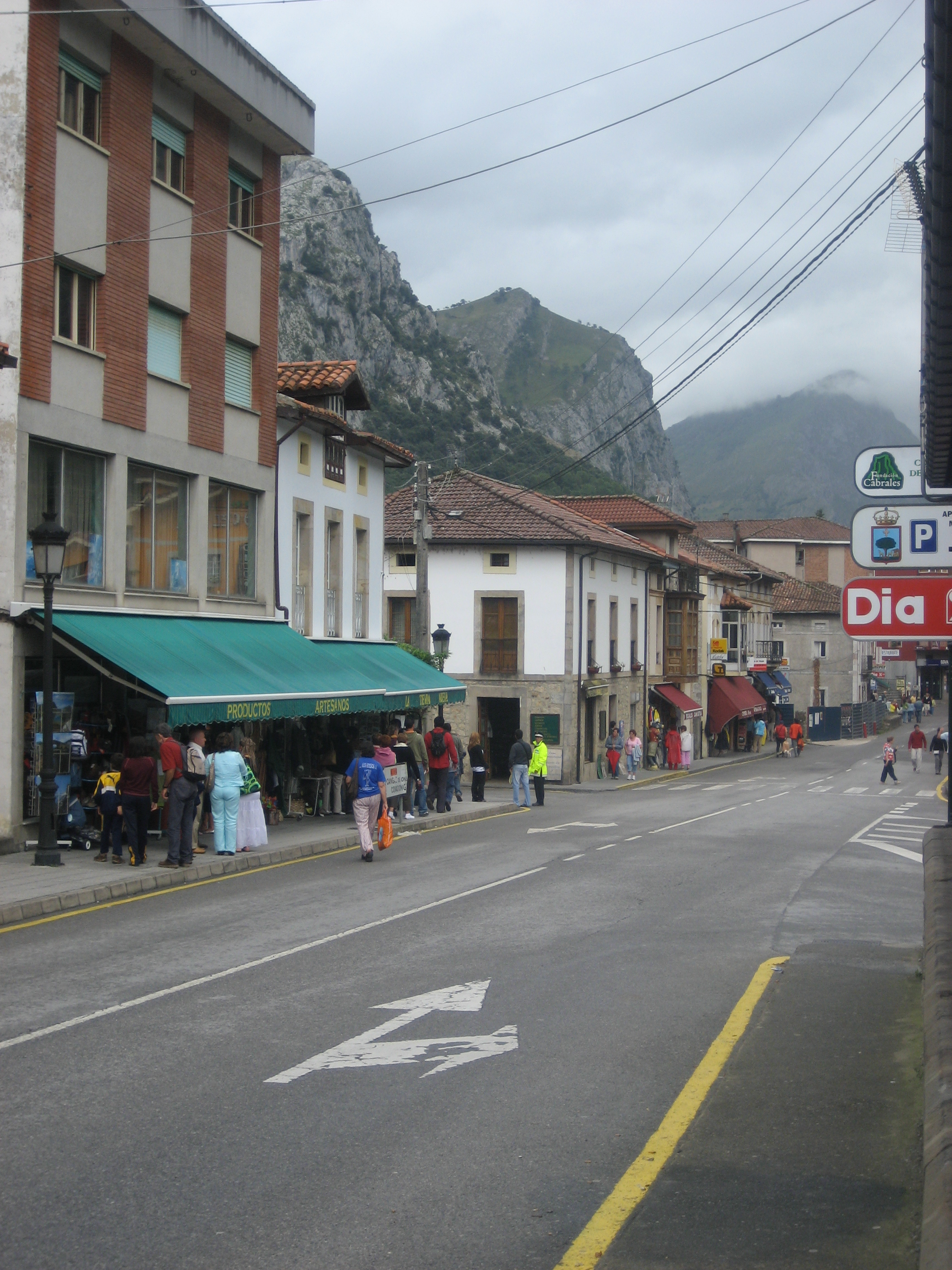

- Location within Spain
- Country: Spain
- Autonomous community: Asturias
- Province: Asturias
- Municipality: Cabrales

Population
  - Total: 882

Las Arenas is one of nine parishes in Cabrales, a municipality within the province and autonomous community of Asturias, in northern Spain.

It is 20.15 km^{2} (7.78 sq mi) in size with a population of 882 (INE 2011).

== Description ==
The town of Las Arenas is about 180 meters (590 ft) above sea level. It is located 3 km to the Southeast of Carreña, the capital of the local council. It has had the title of town since 1910. The demonym associated with those who live there is cabraliegos.

Las Arenas is one of the most important ports of entry into the Picos de Europa (Peaks of Europe) national park, as it is the connection point between the regional road and the local roads which lead closer to the park. Located within the town is the Naranjo de Bulnes peak.

== Villages ==
- Arangas
- Las Arenas
