= AMD Spider =

Platform of computer hardware by AMD

The AMD Spider platform consists of enthusiast level products from AMD, including AMD Phenom X4 9000 series processors, ATI Radeon HD 3800 series GPUs, and the AMD 7 series chipset.

== See also ==
- AMD Dragon
- Phenom (processor)
- Radeon R600
- AMD 700 chipset series
