= Dev (soundtrack) =

Soundtrack album by Harris Jayaraj
- Released: 12 January 2019
- Recorded: 2018
- Studio: Studio H
- Genre: Feature film soundtrack
- Length: 25:20
- Language: Tamil
- Label: Junglee Music
- Producer: Harris Jayaraj

Harris Jayaraj chronology
Spyder (2017)	Dev (2019)	Kaappaan (2019)
External audio
- Audio Jukebox on YouTube

Singles from Dev
- 1. "Anangae Sinungalama" Released: 14 December 2018

Dev is the soundtrack album to the 2019 film of the same name directed by debutant Rajath Ravishankar, starring Karthi and Rakul Preet Singh. The film's musical score and soundtrack is composed by Harris Jayaraj and featured five songs with lyrics written by Thamarai, Kabilan, Vivek and Rajath. Preceded by the lead single "Anangae Sinungalama", the album was released under the Junglee Music label on 12 January 2019 to mixed reviews from critics.

== Development ==
"Whenever I met Karthi, he kept telling me that he wanted to be in a film that had my music. But it just didn’t fall in place till now. Karthi was doing a lot of local, rowdy-ish roles back then, and kept saying that he needed to look really good if he were to do a film that had my songs. Thankfully, Dev has brought us together."

— Harris Jayaraj on his collaboration with Karthi

Dev is the first collaboration with Karthi and Harris Jayaraj; the latter had collaborated with Karthi's brother Suriya on multiple successful films. Jayaraj iterated on composing music for young subjects being his favorite, as he could "work from our heart, have fun with the score, and do not need to follow ‘Kodambakkam rules’ while doing so". Since he had composed for several masala films with leading actors for over a decade, and having not worked with young films—the last film in the genre, he composed was for Vaaranam Aayiram (2008)—he accepted the story, when Rajath narrated it and thought he could justify it musically. He admitted that while Rajath narrated the script of Dev, he was reminiscent of working with late Jeeva, who used "used to work on scripts about the new generation — their problems, happiness, excitement, sorrow… the journey that youngsters go through" which he felt on working with a young director.

Jayaraj went to Kodaikanal to work on the film's music, which he commenced during the Pongal season in January 2018 and completed composing the tunes within eight days. He further discussed with the lyricists Thamarai, Kabilan, Vivek, to find the right words that suited the characters. Jayaraj further used 15 singers for the album, with "Anange" having seven singers, Jayaraj made all of them sing the entire song and took the best lines from each. He stated, "The intention wasn't to have that many singers, but we (director Rajath Ravishankar and I) wondered how different the song would sound in different voices. That's when I came up with this idea to have several singers render it and take the best bits from each to get the final track." The recording of the songs and score were held at Harris' Studio H around 2018.

== Release ==
The soundtrack preceded with the lead single "Anangae Sinungalama" which released on 14 December 2018. The song featured vocals by Hariharan, Tippu, Bharath Sundar, Arjun Chandy, Krish, Christopher Stanley and Sharanya Gopinath, and lyrics written by Thamarai. The New Indian Express noted that the song had similarities with Michael Jackson's 1983 hit single "Billie Jean" with respect to the beats and chorus. The Telugu version of the song "Chelliyaa Adugudhama" was released on 30 December.

The album was launched on 12 January 2019 at the Sathyam Cinemas in Chennai, where the film's cast and crew and other celebrities attended the event, and the songs were released on all digital platforms. The Telugu version of the soundtrack was launched at the pre-release event held at the seven-acre complex located at Annapurna Studios in Hyderabad.

== Track listing ==
Tamil version track listing
No.	Title	Lyrics	Artist(s)	Length
1.	"Anangae Sinungalama"	Thamarai	Hariharan, Christopher Stanley, Tippu, Krish, Arjun Chandy, Bharath Sundar, Sharanya Gopinath	5:59
2.	"Dai Machan Dev"	Vivek	Naresh Iyer, Velmurugan, Malavika Manoj, Deepika	5:03
3.	"She Is My Girl"	Rajath Ravishankar	Haricharan, Christopher Stanley, Mahathi	3:54
4.	"Oru Nooru Murai"	Thamarai	D. Sathyaprakash, Shakthisree Gopalan	5:12
5.	"Engade Nee Pone"	Kabilan	S. P. Balasubrahmanyam	5:12
Total length:				25:20

All lyrics are written by Chandrabose.

Telugu version track listing
No.	Title	Artist(s)	Length
1.	"Chelliyaa Adugudhama"	Hariharan, Christopher Stanley, Tippu, Krish, Arjun Chandy, Bharath Sundar, Sharanya Gopinath	5:58
2.	"Rei Bawa Dev"	Benny Dayal, Velmurugan, Malavika Manoj, Deepika	5:03
3.	"She Is My Girl"	Haricharan, Christopher Stanley, Mahathi	3:53
4.	"Oka Vandha Saaralu"	D. Sathyaprakash, Shakthisree Gopalan	5:10
5.	"Nannu Veedi Etto"	S. P. Balasubrahmanyam	5:11
Total length:			25:15

== Reception ==
V Lakshmi from The Times of India reviewed the album, stating that "The overall vibe of the album is upbeat, though he hasn’t experimented much in terms of the soundscape, the songs are foot-tappingly enjoyable." For the Telugu version, Neetishta Nyayapati summarized that "All in all, the album of Dev is a clear winner with all the numbers in it standing out in their own way — a rarity these days. Harris’ music in particular is refreshing and a delight to listen to, completely reminiscent of a time when music meant more wind instruments and less techno. While it is difficult to pick and choose the best number from the album, Cheliya definitely has to be it for us. However, give the album of Dev a chance this weekend and it might just put a much-needed spring in your step."

Sowmya Rajendran of The News Minute, while writing a negative review for the film, complimented the music saying "Harris Jayaraj's music is the only factor that keeps you from falling asleep." Negatively, Srinivasa Ramanujam of The Hindu wrote that Harris Jayaraj's music "sound just like the songs he dished out a decade ago. ‘Oru Nooru Murai’ is pleasant, but the rest of the songs and the background score is as predictable as they come from the music composer’s stable of songs." Sify wrote "Harris Jayaraj's songs are repetitive and often comes as speed breakers." Gauthaman Bhaskaran of News18 also added "the much publicised Harris Jayaraj music sounds flat, and there was not one number that stayed with me after the curtain came down."
