= Bulnes (Cabrales) =

- Parish
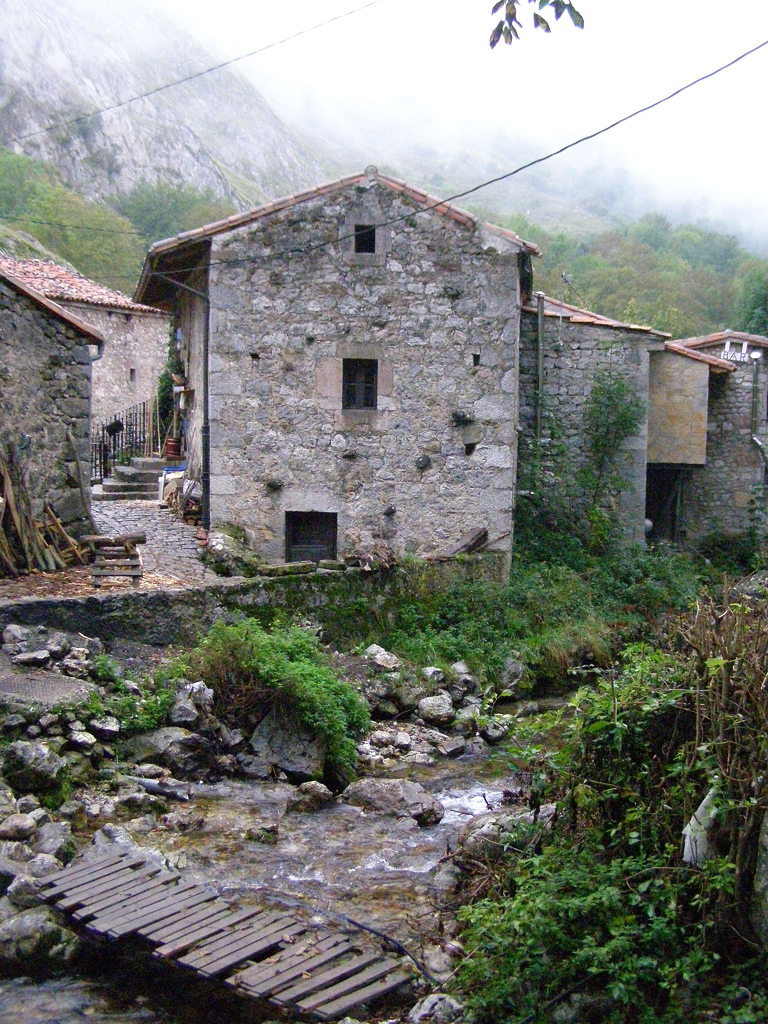
- Buildings in Bulnes

- Location within Spain
- Country: Spain
- Autonomous community: Asturias
- Province: Asturias
- Municipality: Cabrales

Population
  - Total: 34

Bulnes is one of nine parishes (administrative divisions) in Cabrales, a municipality within the province and autonomous community of Asturias, in northern Spain.

It is 56.35 km^{2} (21.76 sq mi) in size with a population of 34 (INE 2011).

== Villages ==
- Bulnes
- Camarmeña

== Transport ==
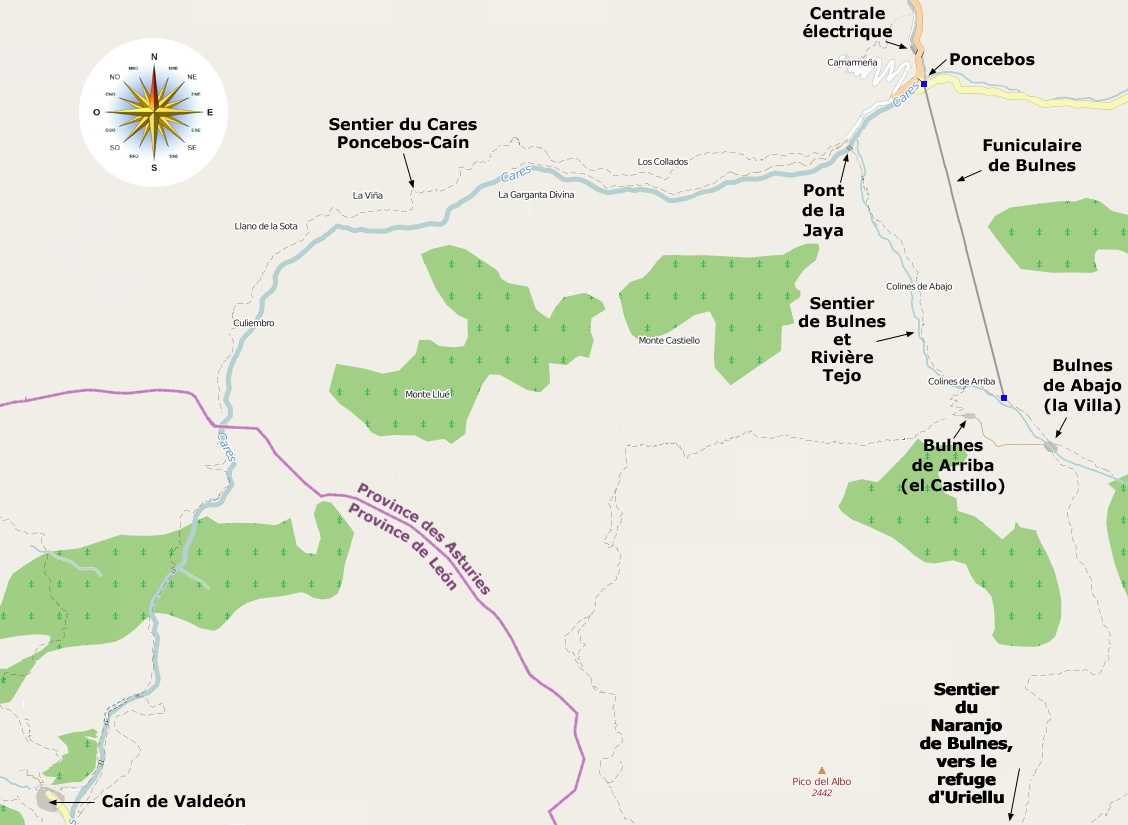
Trails around Bulnes and the funicular

No roads reach Bulnes, however it is served by the Bulnes Funicular from Poncebos.
