= Ben Spider =

Visual artist

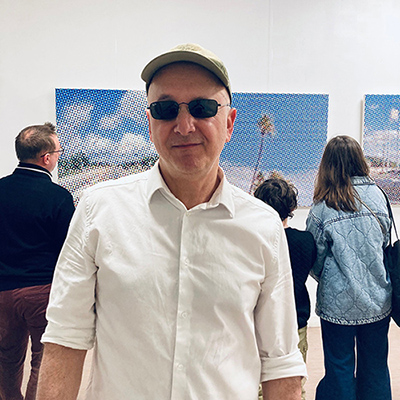
- 2024 by Isolda G
- Born: April 10, 1970; Zurich
- Education: Faculté d'arts plastiques - Université Paris 1 Panthéon-Sorbonne
- Known for: Printmaking, Screen printing, Poetry
- Notable work: Saint Clair Remix (2021) RoadTrip (2022)
- Style: neopointillism, Halftone, contemporary art
- Movement: Appropriation (art), derPunkt

Ben Spider (born April 10, 1970, in Zurich) is a Franco-Swiss visual artist. He practices screen printing, drawing inspiration from images sourced from the media and advertising. In his work, the halftone printing is omnipresent. He explores themes such as image perception, propaganda, and identity in a changing world.

== Biography ==
=== Youth ===
Ben Spider spent his childhood on the French Riviera and arrived in Paris in 1980. His mother introduced him to photography, and his father to graphic design. He studied visual arts at the Sorbonne University, where he attended classes by Michel Journiac. In 1993, he exhibited for the first time at the Sorbonne and at the Donguy gallery. After his studies, he went on a humanitarian mission to Romania, then began a career as a graphic designer in communication.

=== Artistic career ===
In 2015, he began screen printing and created series inspired by his own advertising campaigns and the posters of the Parisian metro. Halftone dots became the central, even obsessive, element of a work described as neo-pointillist.

In 2019, he won the Master Art Prize with the Memory Bugs series. The screen prints in this series consist of accumulated advertisements on the screen until accidental elements occur, such as computer bugs, producing an abstract image reminiscent of system error and glitch aesthetics. The series Special Offers and RadioTrans are based on the same principle of overlay, this time using advertising texts as motifs, whose repetition creates an unreadable image.

Starting from 2020, Ben Spider perfects his digital process and embarks on a more realistic turn through abundant production. He uses screenshots to capture all kinds of media images from news channels and search engines. These are clichés, stereotypes that he blends with other information, as in Europe Hot Chicken (2023), where a weather map overlaps with a packet of dehydrated noodles.

He co-founded the derPunkt movement, which advocates for a global and anti-fascist art, and begins the series RoadTrip, Pop Icons, and Saint Clair Remix. In the Pop Icons series, he gathers portraits of political and entertainment figures as well as everyday consumer products. The treatment aims to create cold, empty, emotionless images, reflecting a world dominated by product marketing. The Ramens are exhibited during his residency at Maison Marceau in 2021.

I make canvas without paint, photos without a camera…

In RoadTrip, Spider uses images of traffic in suburban areas. His oversized dots invites a journey that questions the place of humans in their environment. In 2024, he presents the works from this series at the Nowhere Now exhibition.

Ben Spider dedicates the Saint Clair Remix series (2021) to the reproduction of the painting Saint Clair Healing the Blind (1836) by Hippolyte Flandrin, destroyed in the fire at the Nantes Cathedral in 2020. The halftone version serves as a motif for the creation of around fifteen screen-printed and animated works. This appropriative series addresses themes of vision, absence, and rebirth and references the miracle in monotheistic religions. The canvas Saint Clair Burning is exhibited for the first time at Les Arches Citoyennes in November 2023.

=== Personal life ===
In 1986, he narrowly escapes an attack at the Forum des Halles in Paris. In 2017, he is present during the Turku attack in Finland. These events, spaced thirty years apart, inspire him to create the Apocalypse series. Ben Spider lives in Paris and is the father of two sons.

== Artistic practice ==
=== Style ===
Ben Spider practices a new form of screen printing, starting from halftone screenshots. The term "neo-pointillism" is first used in an interview in 2018. The artist mentioned preferring the reference to Divisionism, which involves a precise system of juxtaposing pure colors. He uses the term "Ultraflat" to describe a flat artwork, without texture or relief.

In addition to the oversized points, his style is characterized by the practice of copy-pasting, overlaying images or advertising texts, and shifting colors. These images can also be subject to alterations such as cropping, enlargement, or the removal of one or more colors. Furthermore, beyond appropriation, Spider engages in image re-appropriation, reproducing works that have already been copied, questioning the source and its anteriority.

I only use four colors. Everything else is unnecessary.

=== Technique ===
His digital screen printing technique involves separating a digital image into four CMYK (Cyan, Magenta, Yellow, and Black) layers and creating a halftone version of each using graphic design software, aiming to achieve an image capable of enlargement.

The four colors are then overlaid again before printing. Their mixture allows him to obtain three secondary colors (red, green, and blue). This process enables him to overcome constraints of size and resolution.

=== Influences ===
Ben Spider draws inspiration from Divisionism and Appropriation (art). His work is also influenced by Art history, Optical art, Glitch art, and Pattern in general. He is fascinated by Le Déjeuner sur l'herbe (1964) by Alain Jacquet, to which he pays tribute in 2020.

=== Controversy ===
His work has sometimes been considered as uniform and unoriginal. In 2023, during a performance, he burns a book by Ernst Gombrich to protest against the absence of female production in official Art history. Due to copyright issues, some of his works are neither exhibited to the public nor available for sale. A Stag's Head is an invisible work, the very existence of which remains hypothetical.

== Selected works ==
- Road Trip, screen prints, since 2022
- Pop Icons, screen prints, since 2021
- Saint Clair Remix, screen prints and animation, 2021
- Ramen Noodles, screen prints, 2021
- art:remix, screen prints, since 2020
- Memory Bugs, screen prints, 2019
- Special Offers, screen prints, 2018
- Fossils, screen prints, 2018

Invisible book cover, 2024

== Publication ==
Invisible (2024), nox.center (see bibliography)

== Awards ==
Master Art Prize, 2019

== Bibliography ==
Spider, Ben; et al. (2024). Invisible (in French) (1st ed.). Paris: nox.center. ISBN 978-2-9589068-1-8. LCCN 2023491641. OCLC 1443603699. BNF 47417800 [INV 2024].
