= Bovensiepen Spider =

German roadster, based on the BMW Z4

Overview
- Manufacturer: Bovensiepen
- Production: 2027 (to commence)
- Assembly: Germany: Buchloe
- Designer: Frank Stephenson

Body and chassis
- Class: Sports car (S)
- Body style: 2-door roadster
- Layout: Front-engine, rear-wheel-drive
- Platform: Cluster Architecture (CLAR)
- Related: BMW Z4 (G29)

Powertrain
- Engine: 3.0 L B58 turbocharged I6
- Transmission: 8-speed ZF 8HP45 automatic

Dimensions
- Wheelbase: 2,470 mm (97.2 in)
- Length: 4,334 mm (170.6 in)
- Width: 1,864 mm (73.4 in)
- Height: 1,304 mm (51.3 in)
- Curb weight: 1,660 kg (3,660 lb)

The Bovensiepen Spider is a roadster produced by German automobile manufacturer Bovensiepen. Based on the BMW Z4 (G29), production is scheduled to commence with deliveries beginning in the first quarter of 2027.

== Development and launch ==
The limited-edition Spider, based on the BMW Z4 (G29) and limited to 99 units, was unveiled in September 2026, although production of the BMW model had already ceased in March 2026. Deliveries are scheduled to begin in the first quarter of 2027. The Z4 design was adapted for the Bovensiepen model by Frank Stephenson.

== Specifications ==
The Spider has a soft top and is 4.33 meters long. Compared to the Z4, the front splitter, wheel arch vents, and side skirts were among the changes. The chassis was also optimized. The three-liter inline six-cylinder B58 gasoline engine from the BMW Z4 M40i was revised and now produces 320 kW (435 hp) in the Spider. The roadster is said to accelerate from 0 to 100 km/h in 4.2 seconds. The top speed is 260 km/h (160 mph), or 295 km/h (183 mph) with the optional Performance Package.

== See also ==
- List of German cars
