= Bovensiepen Zagato =

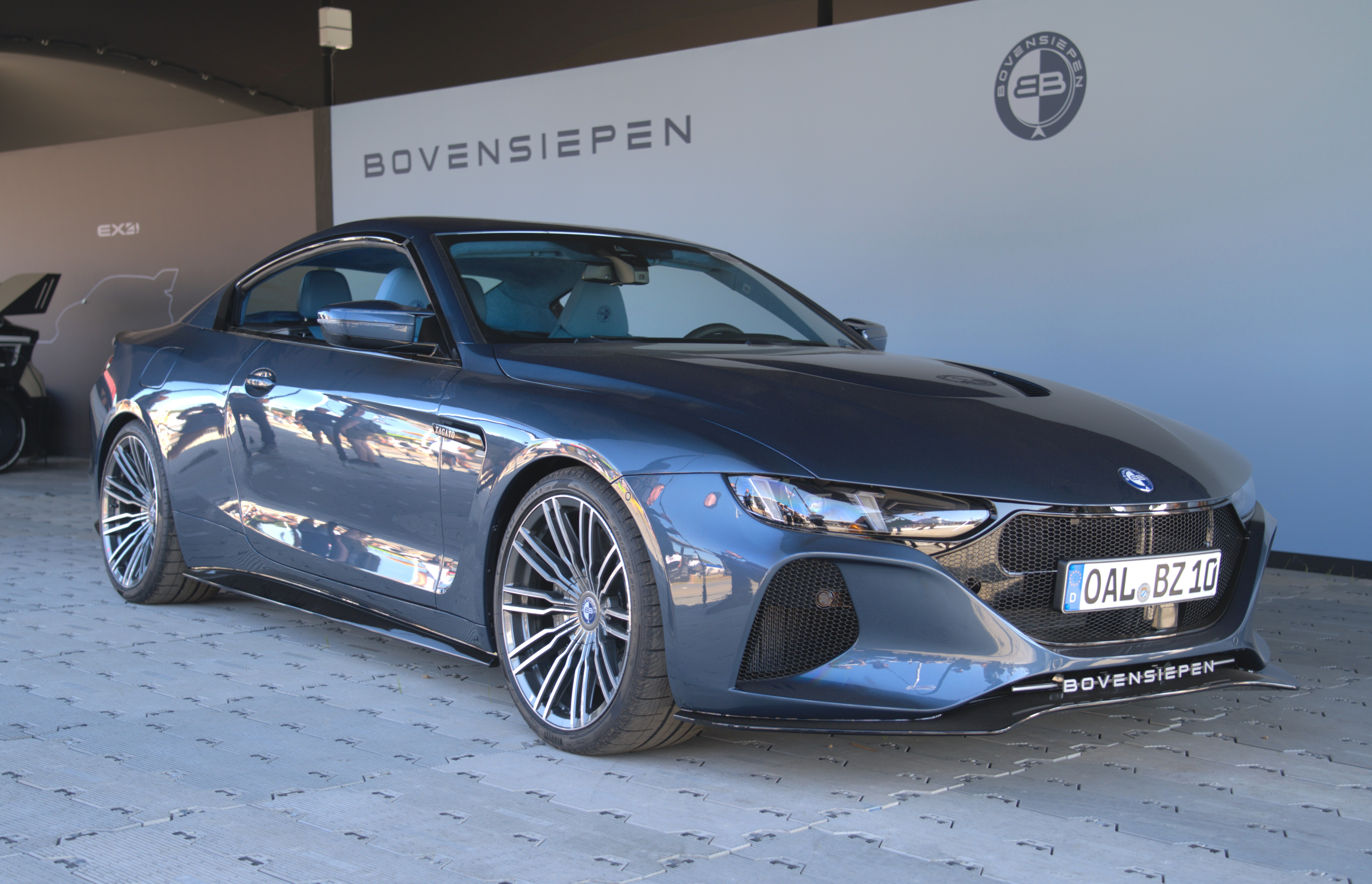

Overview
- Manufacturer: Bovensiepen
- Production: 2026 (to commence)
- Assembly: Germany: Buchloe
- Designer: Norihiko Harada (Zagato chief designer)

Body and chassis
- Related: BMW 4 Series (G22)

Dimensions
- Wheelbase: 2,851 mm (112.2 in)
- Length: 4,943 mm (194.6 in)
- Width: 1,913 mm (75.3 in)
- Height: 1,394 mm (54.9 in)
- Curb weight: 1,875 kg (4,134 lb)

The Bovensiepen Zagato is a coachbuilt grand tourer that was first unveiled at the Concorso d'Eleganza Villa d'Este in 2025. Based on the BMW 4 Series, production is scheduled to commence with deliveries beginning in the second quarter of 2026.

== Overview ==
In May 2025, during the prestigious annual Concorso d'Eleganza Villa d'Este event, the inauguration of Bovensiepen took place, a new company of the German family named after her, previously known for the BMW company Alpina sold in 2022. The first product was a luxury-sports coupe developed in cooperation with the Italian design studio Zagato, which was responsible for the styling of the model named in his honor.

Based on the BMW 4 Series, the model received a comprehensive bodywork overhaul, sharing only the overall body shape with the original. The front fascia features narrow, soaring headlights and a low-set air intake, beneath which sits the manufacturer's name. The sides are adorned with triple creases and muscular rear wheel arches. The rear is finished with quad exhaust tips, a body-integrated spoiler, and a wave-shaped roof with the double fold typical of Zagato designs.

The passenger compartment was entirely carried over from the BMW parent model, distinguishing itself with contrasting colors and textures in the upholstery and a different steering wheel logo. The Bovensiepen was powered by a modified BMW inline-six petrol engine with a displacement of 3 liters and increased power to 611 hp. As a result, the car developed up to 700 Nm of torque, reaching 100 km/h in 3.3 seconds thanks to an 8-speed automatic transmission.
