= Las Ranas =

Las Ranas (Spanish las ranas, "the frogs") may refer to:

- Las Ranas Hill in Red Hill, California
- Rancho Cienega de las Ranas, California
- Las Ranas, site of a fortification at the Tula Mesoamerican site in Mexico
- Las Ranas, population center and site of a ball court in Querétaro, Mexico
- City of Las Ranas in the municipality of Puruándiro, Michoacán, Mexico.
- Fuente de las Ranas (Albacete)
- Plaza de Las Ranas in Las Palmas, Gran Canaria
