= Tubing spider =

A Tubing spider is a tool used primarily in the oil industry for gripping the drill string while assembling or reassembling parts of the string.

The spider is normally operated hydraulically from a remote location. The spider consists of multiple gripper tools, sometimes constructed as wedge-shaped arms (Slips (oil drilling)) that holds the string by the downward force of the pipe. Teeth on the inside of the slips grip the pipe, and the resulting compressive force inward on the drill pipe holds the pipe securely.
