= Bovensiepen family =

Dutch-origined German family

The Bovensiepen family is a German family of Dutch origin from Mettmann in the Rhineland, members of whom have been noted as industrialists and academics. The family has had branches in the Rhineland, Hesse and Bavaria.

== History ==
A branch of the family were owners of the still extant leading precision machine making company Peter Wolters GmbH (founded in Mettmann in 1804 and relocated to Rendsburg in 1975) from 1892, after Friedrich Bovensiepen had married Ida Wolters, a daughter of the firm's founder Johann Peter Wolters (1777–1850). Among his descendants were the legal scholar Rudolf Bovensiepen, married to Baroness Elisabeth Emma von der Goltz. They were the parents of the factory owner Otto Rudolf Bovensiepen, whose company produced office machinery, and who was the father of Burkard Bovensiepen, who founded the Alpina Burkard Bovensiepen automobile manufacturing company.

The physician Gustav Bovensiepen (born 1910 in Mettmann) was married to Esther Elisabeth von Kluge, daughter of General Field Marshal Günther von Kluge.
