= Operation Araña =

Spanish police operation (2014–2017)

Operation Araña (Spanish: Operación Araña) is the codename given to the 2014–17 Civil Guard operation in Spain against the defense of terrorism on social media, mainly on Facebook and Twitter. The name Araña means Spider. Until now, it has consisted on four phases:

- Operation Araña I (April 2014), before the 2014 European Parliamentary Election.
- Operation Araña II (November 2014).
- Operation Araña III (May 2015), concurrent with the 2015 Spanish regional elections. Alfredo Remírez, a Twitter user arrested during this phase, was sentenced to prison for reiteration of defense of terrorism on social media on 1 November 2017. He was imprisoned on 4 November, three days later.
- Operation Araña IV (April 2016), before the 2016 Spanish general election.

== Criticism ==
Since its start, the operation has been heavily criticised. Amnesty International, on their 2016–2017 report, mentioned the operation among the cases of unjustified restrictions of freedom of information, speech and assembly in relation with the recent reform of the Spanish Criminal Code and the 2015 passing of the Organic Law on the Protection of Citizen Security (Spanish: Ley Orgánica de protección de la seguridad ciudadana).

In January 2017, Def Con Dos rap rock band member and spokesperson César Strawberry was sentenced to one year on prison because of a series of tweets related to ETA and GRAPO. In March 2017, a 21-year-old student was sentenced to one year of prison, due to a series of jokes about the assassination of francoist Prime minister Carrero Blanco. Both sentences generated criticism and raised a debate about freedom of speech and social media.
