= Speeder =

Speeder may refer to:

- Railroad speeder, a small railcar
- Speeder (motor vessel), a 1908 launch
- Speeders (TV program), US, 2007–2009
- A speed limit breaking driver
- Speeder bike, a fictional hoverbike

== See also ==
- Snow-speeder (disambiguation)
- Landspeeder, a fictional hovercar
