= TR Araña =

Ground analysis robot based on suspected fraudulent technology

The TR Araña (Spanish, meaning "route tracing spider") is a robot that is claimed to remotely analyse the composition of the ground. The device was created by Chilean inventor Manuel Salinas and was reported to be able to operate at depths of up to 50 metres. It is widely believed by the scientific community to be a fraud.

== Principles ==
Answering a request by the Chilean Commission on Nuclear Energy, Salinas wrote the following paragraph:

"[The principle behind the robot is] The non linear integration of the basic unit of life conformation the way it is known; therefore and merely as a functional and explanatory concept, I detail that our device is the integration of highly sophisticated electronic components which are able to decipher the unanimity equation in the chaos theory in the context of an integral raised to the power of the radical exponent, based in the conformation of the species, the way they are known after 20,000 years of assisted evolution."

— Manuel Salinas

At a presentation to students, physicists, and engineers at the Universidad Técnica Federico Santa María in Valparaíso, Chile, on 12 October 2005, Salinas gave improbable and seemingly irrational theories to explain how his machine worked. He offered inconsistent explanations of the device, including using concepts from science fiction, when questioned by the audience. The presentation and questioning were stopped when a professor, Dr. Patricio Häberle, announced that the University would neither support it nor give space for it to be presented, and that what Salinas had talked about was not genuine.

== Criticism ==
Salinas says that the robot bounces a nuclear signal off materials to search for specific atomic compositions. Consensus exists among scientists that the technology Salinas says is used on the robot works— but only to depths of 30 cm and anything beyond that, such as the dozens of meters he claims to be able to probe, would be considered a technological advance.

Salinas has refused to patent the machine, saying the technology is "an industrial secret."
