= Spyder (soundtrack) =

- Telugu version cover

Soundtrack album by Harris Jayaraj
- Released: 9 September 2017
- Recorded: 2017
- Genre: Feature film soundtrack
- Length: 22:42 / 18:40
- Language: Telugu; Tamil
- Label: Zee Music Company
- Producer: Harris Jayaraj

Harris Jayaraj chronology
Vanamagan (2017)	Spyder (2017)	Dev (2018)

Singles from Spyder
- 1. "Boom Boom" Released: 2 August 2017; 2. "Haali Haali / Aali Aali" Released: 4 September 2017

Spyder is the soundtrack to the 2017 Telugu-language psychological action thriller film of the same name directed by A. R. Murugadoss and produced by N. V. Prasad, starring Mahesh Babu, S. J. Suryah and Rakul Preet Singh. The film's music is composed by Harris Jayaraj and featured six songs for the Telugu version with lyrics written by Ramajogayya Sastry and five songs for the Tamil version which had lyrics by Madhan Karky. The soundtrack for both versions were released by Zee Music Company on 9 September 2017.

== Development ==
In January 2016, it was announced that Harris Jayaraj would compose the film's music and background score. The film marked Jayaraj's fourth collaboration with Murugadoss after Ghajini (2005), 7 Aum Arivu (2011) and Thuppakki (2012). Recording of the songs commenced in early 2017. Initially, Madhan Karky who wrote lyrics for the Tamil songs wanted to write the lyrics for one of the song for the Telugu version, marking his debut in the Telugu industry. However, Ramajogayya Sastry wrote all the songs in the Telugu version.

The song "Haali Haali" (in Tamil as "Aali Aali") was recorded in June 2017, with Brijesh Shandilya describing it as "a desi romantic number". Shandilya previously recorded the titular track for Sarrainodu (2016) in Telugu, and also making his debut in Tamil, he described it as a "fantastic experience" recording at Jayaraj's studio and learnt a lot from the composer. The Tamil version initially had five tracks while the Telugu version had a sixth track titled "Akkada Vunnavadu" sung by Geetha Madhuri. This song was not included in the film's Tamil version. Jayaraj completed recording the film's background score on 21 September 2017.

== Marketing ==
A teaser for the first single "Boom Boom" was released online on 30 July 2017. The full song was released three days later on the music streaming platform Saavn. Nikhita Gandhi provided vocals for both versions. The Indian Express described it as "an introduction song with peppy and upbeat music" and Firstpost called it as "a groovy techno-beat number". Sridhar Adivi of The Times of India wrote "Boom Boom song is a classy number with entirely mass lyrics and although connoisseurs might be a tad disappointed with the final out, it will surely reverberate with fans of Mahesh."

The second single "Haali Haali" (in Tamil as "Aali Aali") was released on 4 September 2017; it is a duet song picturized on Babu and Singh, and performed by Shandilya, Harini and Sunitha Upadrashta. It was described by India Today as a "fast-paced folkish romantic number". Reviewing the Tamil version, Ashameera Aiyappan of The Indian Express opined that "the dance number has sensual undertones interspersed with folk beats, but nothing that excites the listener immensely". Aiyappan also indicated how Karky's lyrics in the second verse referenced the process of entertainment tax exemption being abolished due to Goods and Services Tax. (Note: During 2006, the Tamil Nadu government led by then-Chief Minister of Tamil Nadu M. Karunanidhi passed an order to which films that received U certificate and with only Tamil-language titles are eligible for entertainment tax exemption. This, however, was failed to apply due to the implementation of Goods and Services Tax.) Adivi called it as a "Punjabi song in Telugu" and said that "The lyrics of the song has been penned by Ramajogayya Sastry are unique in the sense that they convey common place emotions in a different way. On the whole the song is definitely bound to appeal to the mass and class audiences alike."

== Release ==
The film's music was launched at the Kalaivanar Arangam in Chennai on 9 September 2017. Though Rajinikanth, S. Shankar and S. S. Rajamouli were considered to felicitate the event as the chief guests, the event was instead felicated by producers Kalaipuli S. Thanu, K. E. Gnanavel Raja, actor and Tamil Film Producers Council president Vishal, veteran directors Keyaar and Vikraman. The event saw the attendance of 10,000 fans at the venue. The album was also released in Telugu the same day, although no event was held for the Telugu version.

== Reception ==
=== Telugu ===
Karthik Srinivasan of Milliblog stated that the album is "a predictable Harris Jayaraj package with two good-enough songs." Ramesh Kannan of Moviecrow rated the album 3 out of 5 stating that "Harris Jayaraj delivers an engaging album filled with the composer’s signature sounds throughout the soundtrack." Jeevi of Idlebrain.com wrote "Harris Jayaraj's tunes for this film are not fresh. But he makes it up with his background score."

=== Tamil ===
For the soundtrack of the Tamil version, Sharanya CR from The Times of India reviewed that "Except for two songs, Harris doesn’t really up the magic quotient for SPYder." Siddharth Srinivas from Sify gave 3 out of 5 stating "Spyder is a lightweight, frothy soundtrack from Harris that's high on style but not too much on substance."

== Track listing ==
=== Telugu ===
All lyrics are written by Ramajogayya Sastry.

Spyder (Original Motion Picture Soundtrack) Telugu version track listing
No.	Title	Singer(s)	Length
1.	"Boom Boom"	Nikhita Gandhi	4:15
2.	"Ciciliya Ciciliya"	Haricharan, Shakthisree Gopalan	4:43
3.	"Haali Haali"	Brijesh Shandilya, Harini, Sunitha Upadrashta	5:31
4.	"Achcham Telugandham"	Pravin Saivi, Christopher Stanley, Sathya Prakash, Hemachandra, Sooraj Santhosh, Krish, Karunya, Aalap Raju	2:57
5.	"Spyder on Mission"	Instrumental	1:14
6.	"Akkada Vunnavadu"	Geetha Madhuri	4:02
Total length:			22:42

=== Tamil ===
All lyrics are written by Madhan Karky.

Spyder (Original Motion Picture Soundtrack) Tamil version track listing
No.	Title	Singer(s)	Length
1.	"Boom Boom"	Nikhita Gandhi	4:15
2.	"Ciciliya Ciciliya"	Haricharan, Shakthisree Gopalan	4:43
3.	"Aali Aali"	Brijesh Shandilya, Harini, Sunitha Upadrashta	5:31
4.	"Otrai Iravukaai"	Pravin Saivi, Christopher Stanley, Sathya Prakash	2:57
5.	"Spyder on Mission"	Instrumental	1:14
Total length:			18:40
