= AMD Dragon =

AMD Dragon is a platform engineered for gamers, designed for use with the AMD Phenom II X4 processor family. The goal for the platform is to offer the user a powerful gaming system.

Having a level 3 cache memory of 6 megabytes and support for the latest DDR3 memories, AMD claims the Dragon platform will allow for up to 20 percent faster performance than previous platforms.

The first versions are available for mainboards offering an AM2+ socket, supporting DDR2 memories, but the AM3 socket using DDR3 memory will be the primary socket type for the Dragon platform.

A system conforming to the platform specification was said to be a combination of a Phenom II X4 processor and a mainboard using a chipset from the AMD 700 chipset series, along with a graphics card of the ATI Radeon HD 4800 series. Pre-built systems using the platform were offered by Dell, HP and Alienware among others.
