= La Araña =

La Araña is the Spanish translation for "the Spider".

La Araña may also refer to:

- Julián Álvarez (born 2000), Argentine Atlético Madrid footballer
- Roberto Vásquez (born 1984), Mexican-American boxer
- "La araña", a 2022 song by Jimena Barón

== See also ==
- Arana (disambiguation)
- Las Arañas (disambiguation)
