= Las Arañas, O'Higgins Region =

Coordinates: 34°32′54.87″S 71°15′7.90″W

Las Arañas
- Interactive map of Las Arañas
- Region: O'Higgins
- Province: Colchagua
- Municipalidad: Chépica
- Comuna: Chépica

Government
  - Type: Municipality
  - Alcalde: Fabián Soto
- Elevation: 204 m (669 ft)

Population (2017)
  - Total: 418

Sex
  - Men: 211
  - Women: 207
- Time zone: UTC-4 (Chilean Standard)
  - Summer (DST): UTC-3 (Chilean Daylight)
- Area code: Country + town = 56 + 72

Las Arañas is a village (Spanish: caserío) in O'Higgins Region, Chile. It is located about 204 m asl. in 2.3 km northeast of Chépica. Its name means literally "The Spiders".
