= Cabrales =

- Municipality
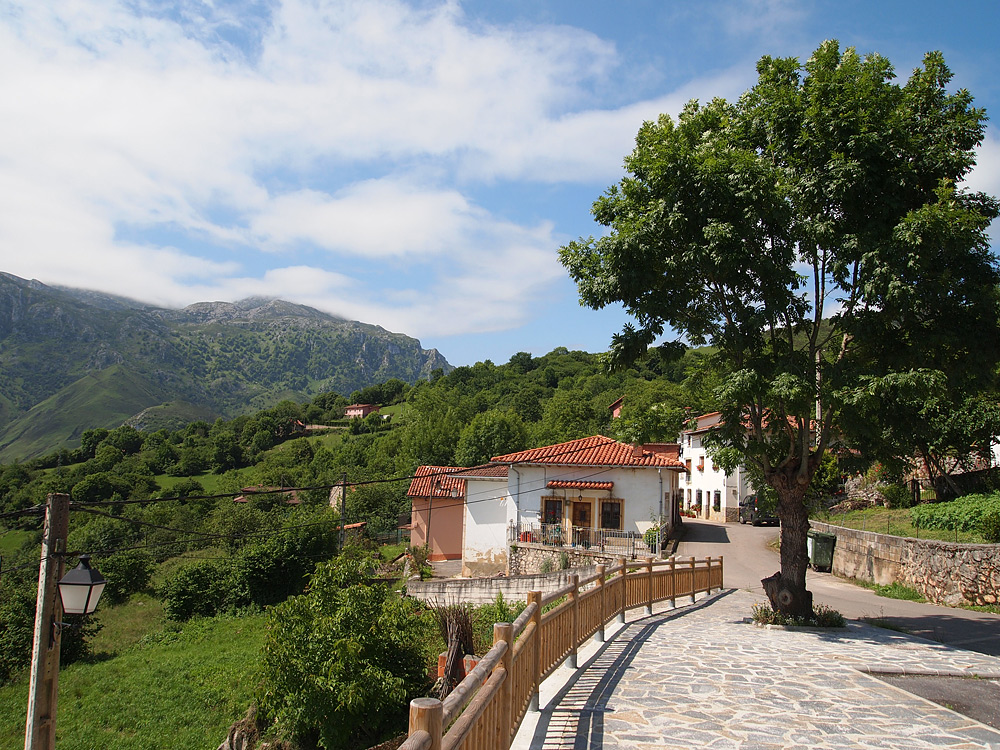
- Prado, Cabrales

- Flag Coat of arms

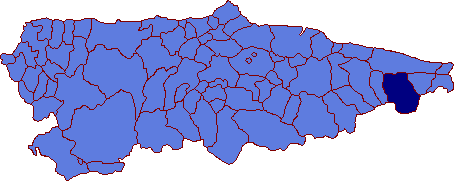

- Location in Spain
- Coordinates: 43°17′N 4°46′W
- Country: Spain
- Autonomous community: Asturias
- Province: Asturias
- Comarca: Oriente
- Judicial district: Llanes
- Capital: Carreña

Government
  - Alcalde: José Vicente del Carmen Bustillo (PSOE)

Area
  - Total: 238.29 km^{2} (92.00 sq mi)
- Highest elevation: 2,648 m (8,688 ft)

Population (2023)
  - Total: 1,918
  - Density: 8.049/km^{2} (20.85/sq mi)
- Demonym: cabraliego
- Time zone: UTC+1 (CET)
  - Summer (DST): UTC+2 (CEST)
- Postal code: 33555
- Website: Official website

Cabrales is a municipality in the autonomous community of Asturias, Spain. It is situated between the Sierra de Cuera and the Picos de Europa, and is a region famous for its Cabrales cheese. It is divided into nine parishes; Las Arenas is the largest, with a population 767 as of 2023. The population for the municipality as a whole sat at 1,918 as of 2023.

== Geography ==
Cabrales lies on the border between Asturias and its neighbouring autonomous community Castile and León. It is a highly mountainous region; it contains within it parts of the Sierra de Cuera and Picos de Europa. It is located on the Central Massif of the Cantabrian Mountains. Two notable peaks in Cabrales are Torre Cerredo and Naranjo de Bulnes, which both sit at an altitude of over 2,500 m; the former is the highest peak in the Cantabrian mountain range. It has a very temperate climate, with an average yearly temperature of 12 °C.

The municipality is divided into nine parishes:

- Berodia
- Bulnes
- Carreña
- Las Arenas
- Poo
- Prado
- Puertas
- Sotres
- Tielve

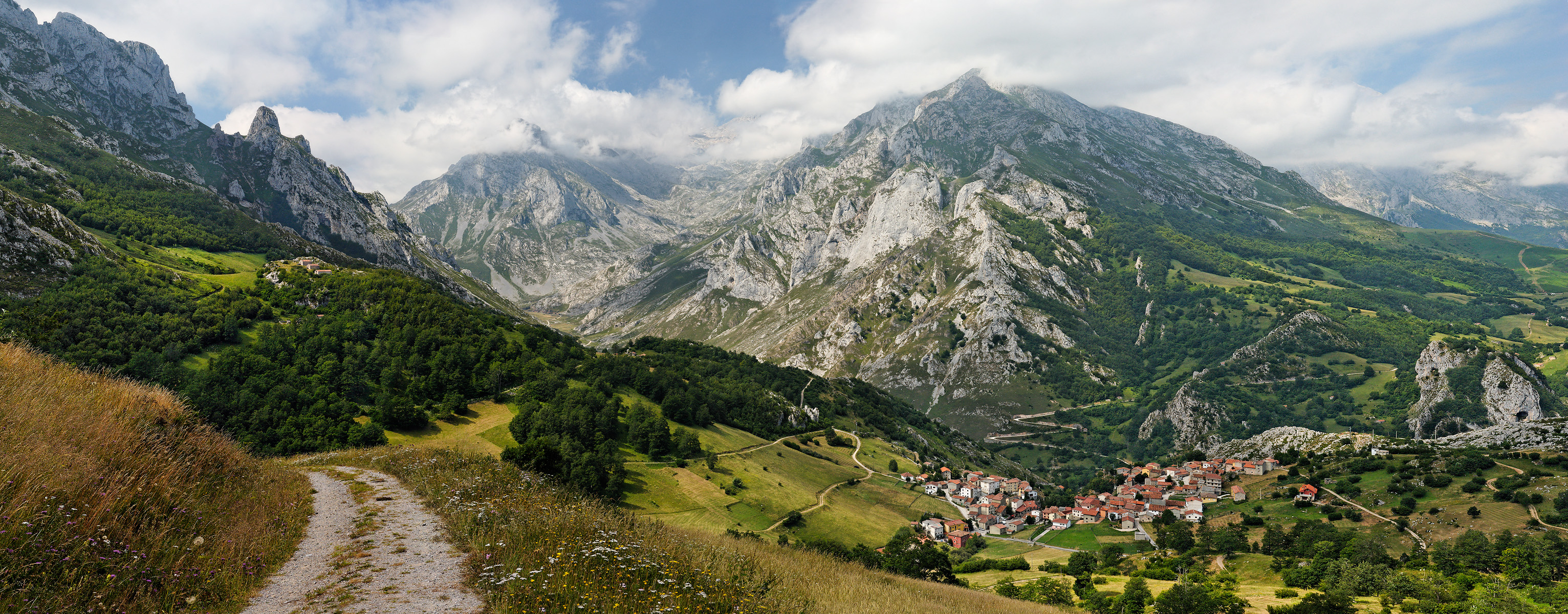
Sotres, Cabrales

== History ==
There have been many artifacts from prehistory found in Cabrales. Upper Paleolithic tools made from stone and bone were found in the region, alongside cave paintings and a burial site in Las Canes cave. Bronze Age-era axes found in the municipality were given the name "Cabrales axes." There is almost nothing recorded regarding Cabrales during the Roman conquest of Spain.

Cabrales' first mention in the Middle Ages was when it was noted that the Moors fled the area following their defeat at Covadonga in 722. Cabrales was mentioned as a territorial entity in the 12th century, but generally lacked political importance at the time. In the 14th century, Cabrales was officially referred to as a municipality when they were recorded as supporting Pedro I of Castile. Later, in the 16th century, the region was ruled by several powerful families, including the Barcena and the González de Buerdo dynasties.

The region was a site of the Battle of El Mazucu during the Spanish Civil War in September 1937. Francoist forces overwhelmed the Republican army, defeating them; this eventually led to the Republic's retreat from Asturias. Throughout its history, the economy of Cabrales had always been centered around dairy; Cabrales cheese famously comes from the region. However, in the 1980s, the municipality began a shift towards the tourism and hotel industries, causing the dairy industry in the region to take a backseat to the tertiary sector in terms of employment.

== See also ==
- List of municipalities in Asturias
