= Las Arañas, Santiago Metropolitan Region =

Coordinates: 33°39′22.23″S 70°20′39″W

Las Arañas
- Interactive map of Las Arañas
- Region: Santiago Metropolitan
- Province: Cordillera
- Municipalidad: San José de Maipo
- Comuna: San José de Maipo

Government
  - Type: Municipality
  - Alcalde: Luis Pezoa Álvarez (RN)

Population (2017)
  - Total: 181

Sex
  - Men: 103
  - Women: 78
- Time zone: UTC-4 (Chilean Standard)
  - Summer (DST): UTC-3 (Chilean Daylight)
- Area code: Country + town = 56 + 53

Las Arañas is a hamlet (Spanish: caserío) in the Andes of Santiago Metropolitan Region, Chile. It is located about 1086 m asl. in Cajón del Maipo, southeast of San José de Maipo. Its name means literally "The Spiders".
