= Carreña =

- Parish
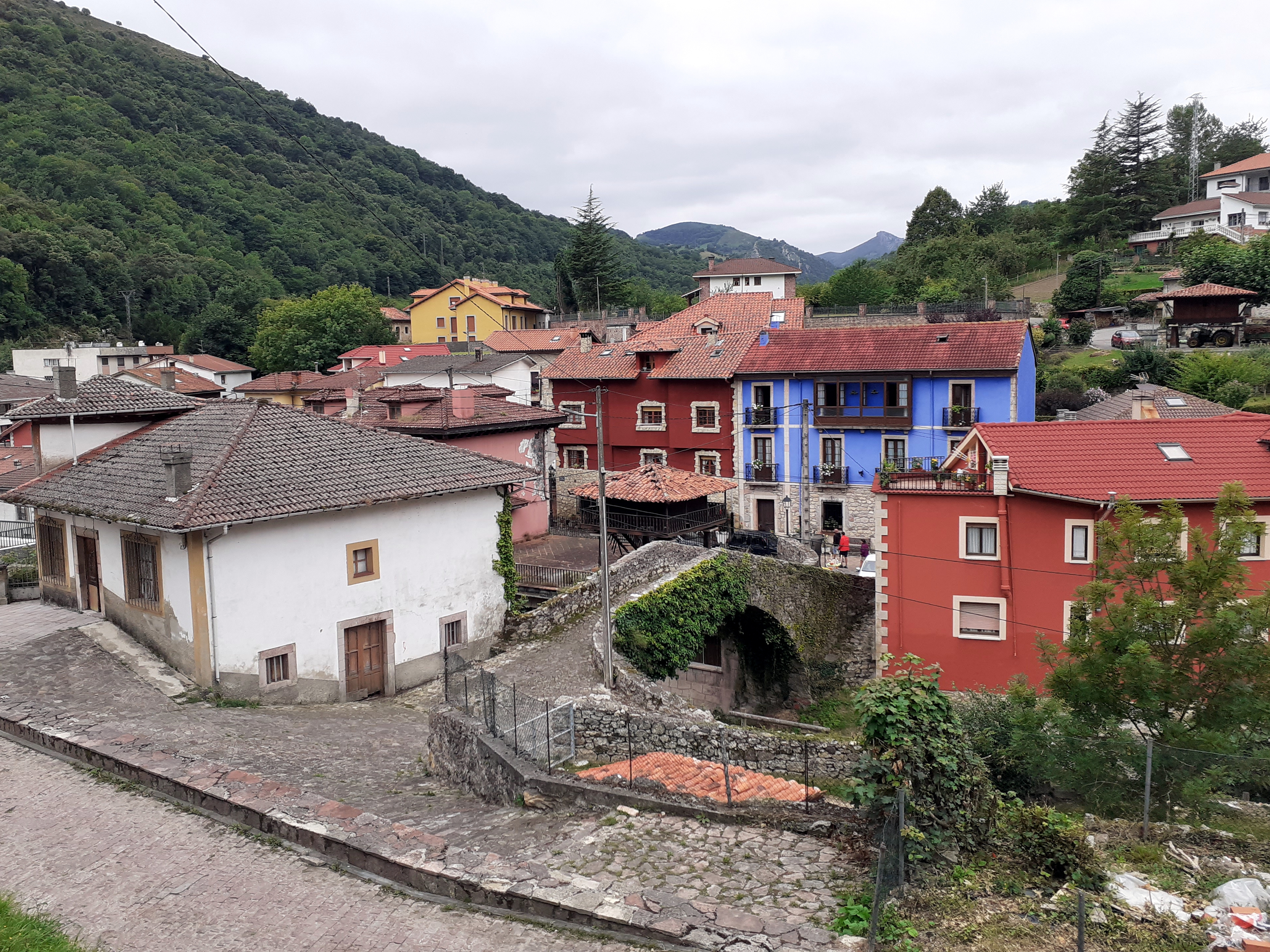

- Location within Spain
- Country: Spain
- Autonomous community: Asturias
- Province: Asturias
- Municipality: Cabrales

Population
  - Total: 412

Carreña is one of nine parishes (administrative divisions) in Cabrales, a municipality within the province and autonomous community of Asturias, in northern Spain.

It is 19.95 km^{2} (7.70 sq mi) in size with a population of 412 (INE 2011).

== Villages ==
1. Asiego
2. Carreña
3. Pandellana
