= Ra's Sajir =

Coordinates: 16°45′50″N 53°36′00″E

Ra's Sajir (Arabic: رأس ساجر), also transliterated as Ra's Sājir, is a 900 m (3,000 ft) high sea cliff and headland in Dhofar, Oman. The cliffs are located near the town of Shaat and overlook the open Arabian Sea. This region of the Arabian Peninsula experiences a summer monsoon known as the Khareef. This leads to Ra's Saj ir's green landscape in the summer months, unusual for much the Arabian region. Throughout history, Ra's Sajir has acted as a notable landmark for seafaring traders passing between the Red Sea and the Persian Gulf and India.
