= Polar Sun Spire =

Coordinates: 70.55°N 071.25°W

Polar Sun Spire is a peak in Beluga Mountain in the Sam Ford Fjord of Baffin Island, Canada. The spire is notable for its spectacular 1,300 m (4,300 ft) north face. The first ascent was made in 1996 by Mark Synnott, Jeff Chapman and Warren Hollinger. The team spent a full month on the climb and summited after 36 consecutive nights in a portaledge. They encountered difficulties up to A4 and named their 34-pitch route "The Great and Secret Show." A Norwegian team established another line in 2000.
