= Montagne des Érables =

Massif in Quebec, Canada

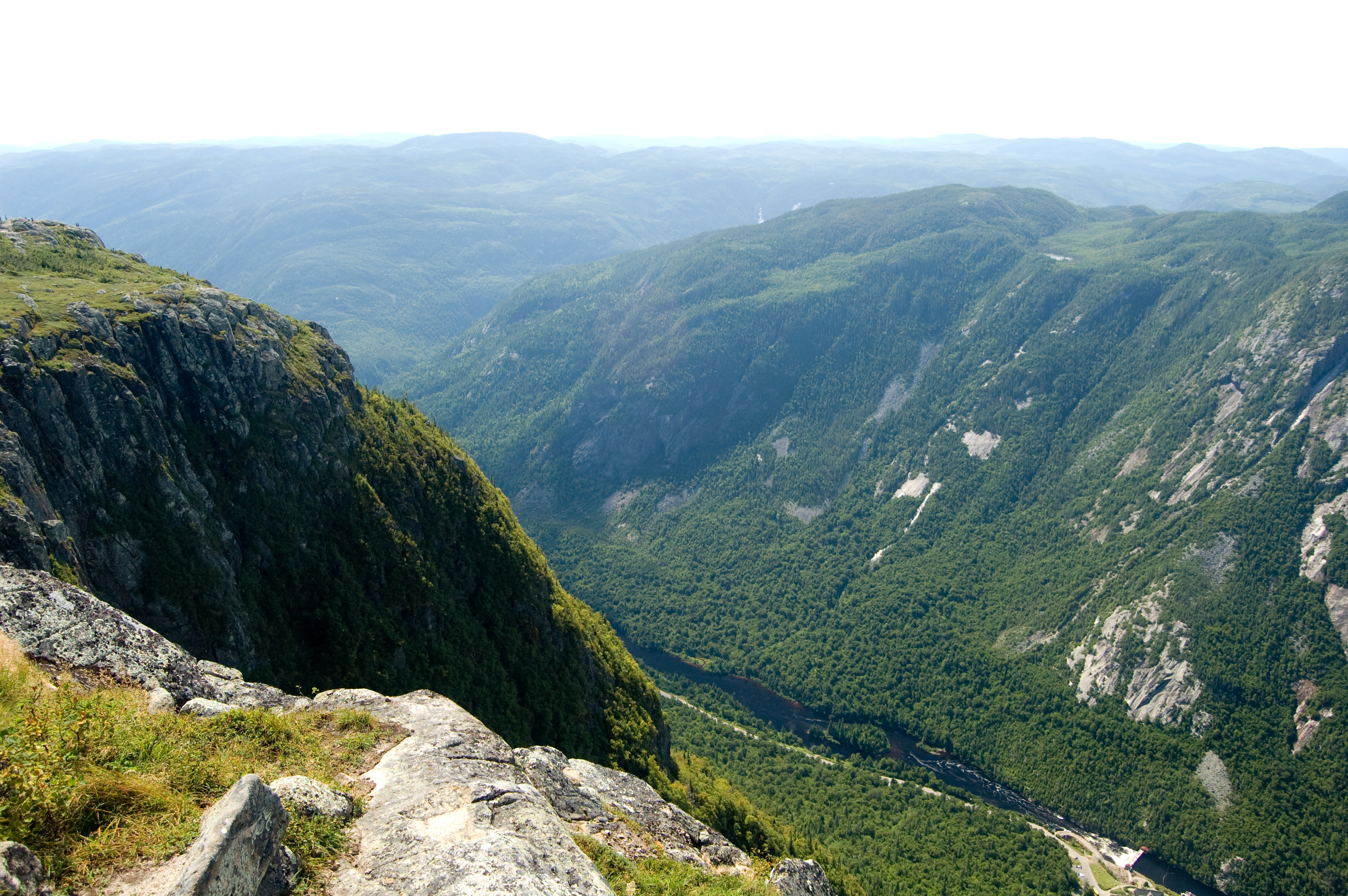
- l'Acropole des Draveurs, a face of the mountain, in the foreground

Highest point
- Elevation: 1,048 m (3,438 ft)
- Prominence: 408 m (1,339 ft)
- Isolation: 5.51 km (18,100 ft)
- Coordinates: 47°53′22″N 70°27′18″W

Naming
- English translation: Maple Mountain
- Language of name: French

Geography
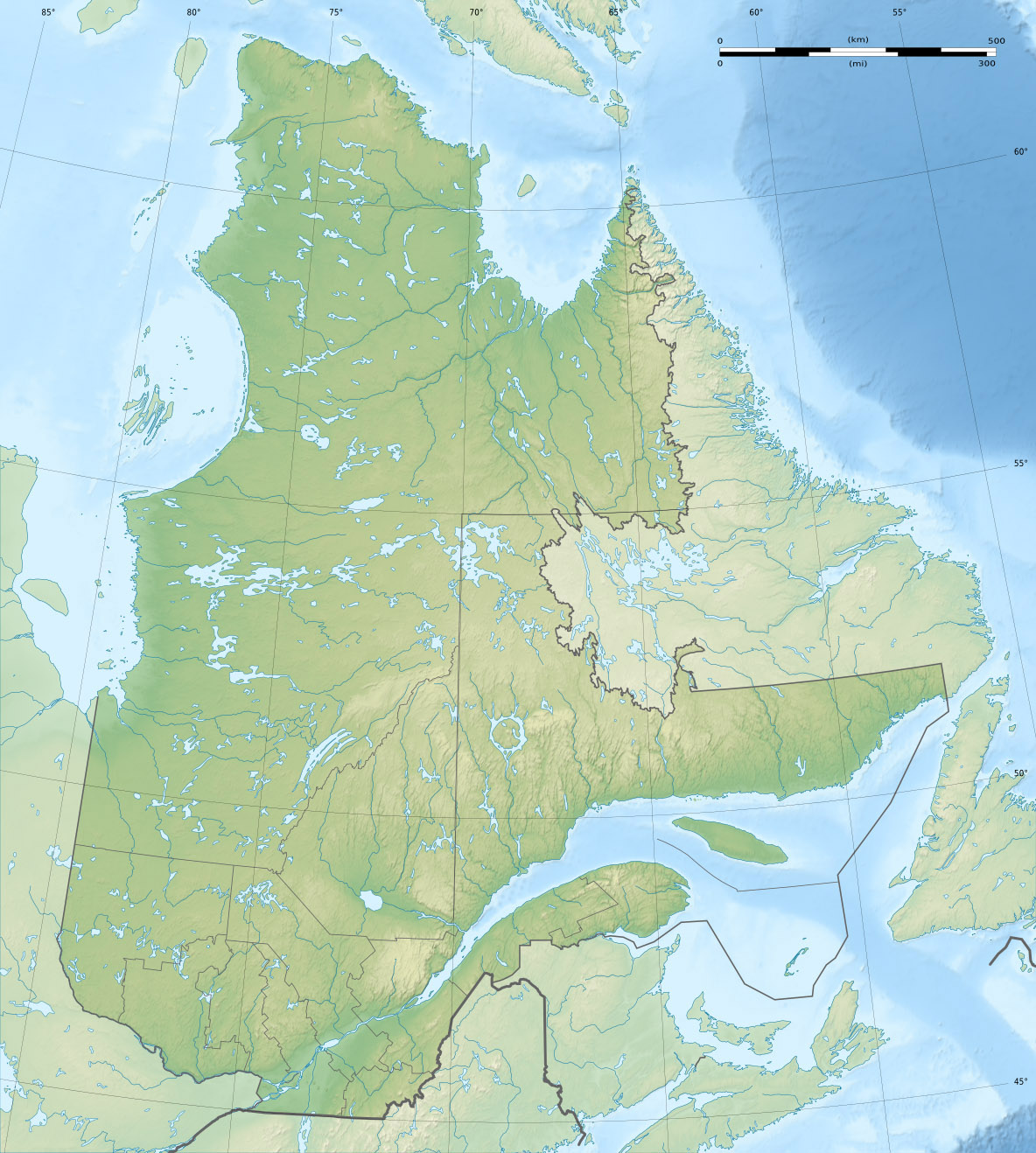
- Location within Quebec
- Location: Charlevoix-Est, Quebec, Canada
- Parent range: Laurentian Mountains
- Topo map: NTS 21M16 Lac au Plongeon

Climbing
- Easiest route: Hiking
- Access: entrance to the Hautes-Gorges-de-la-Rivière-Malbaie National Park

The Montagne des Érables, also known as Mont des Érables (translation: Maple Mountain), is a massif located in the Charlevoix-Est regional county municipality in the Charlevoix region of Quebec, Canada. It lies in the Hautes-Gorges-de-la-Rivière-Malbaie National Park and is home to l'Acropole des Draveurs, a popular hike in the province. It is accessible via the entrances to the park, the main one being located in Saint-Aimé-des-Lacs.

== Etymology ==
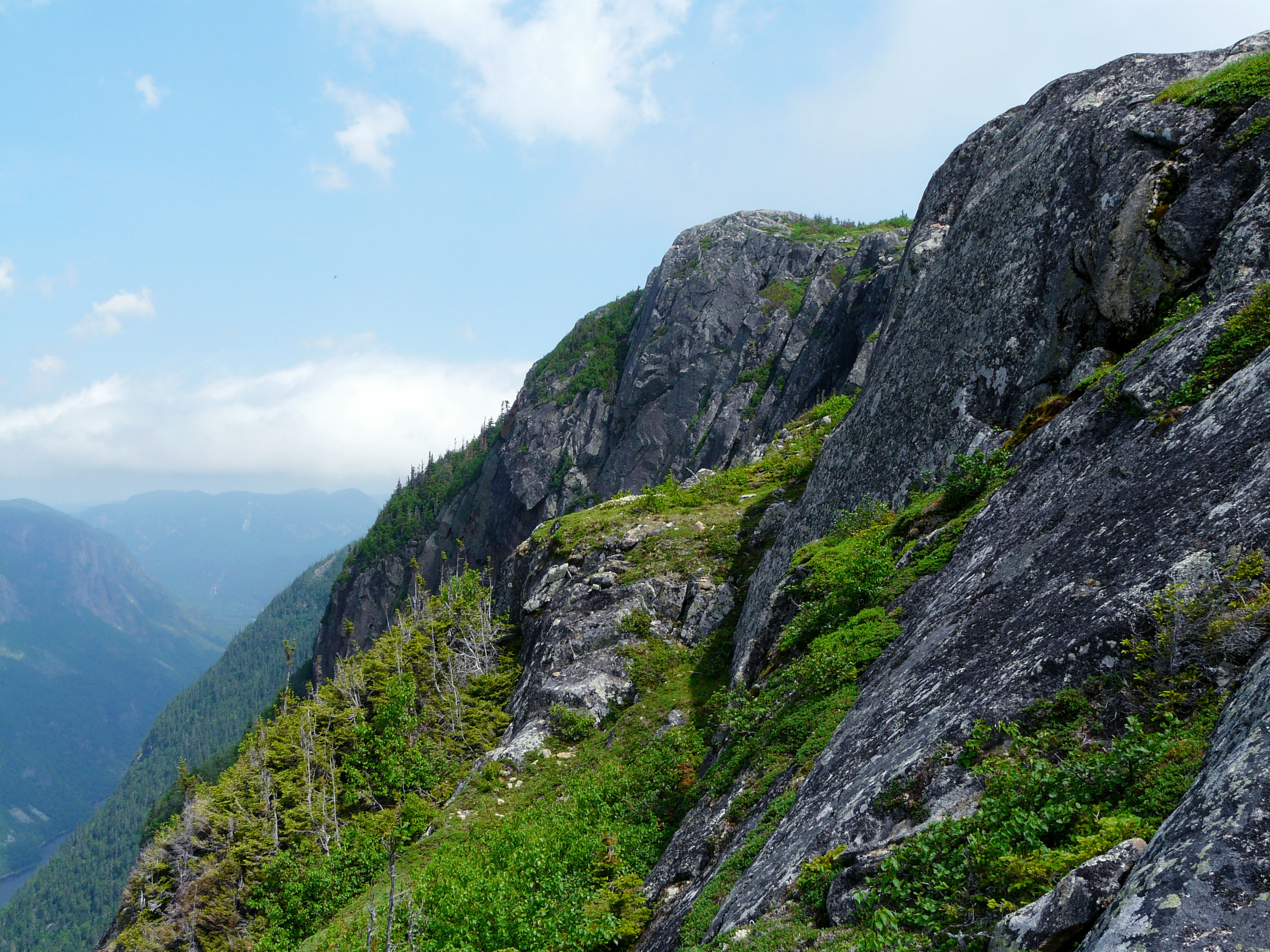
Montagne des Érables

The mountain (along with many other geographic features and manmade installations in the park), whose name translates to "Maple Mountain," takes its name from the unique presence of maples juxtaposed with the tundra.

== Geography ==
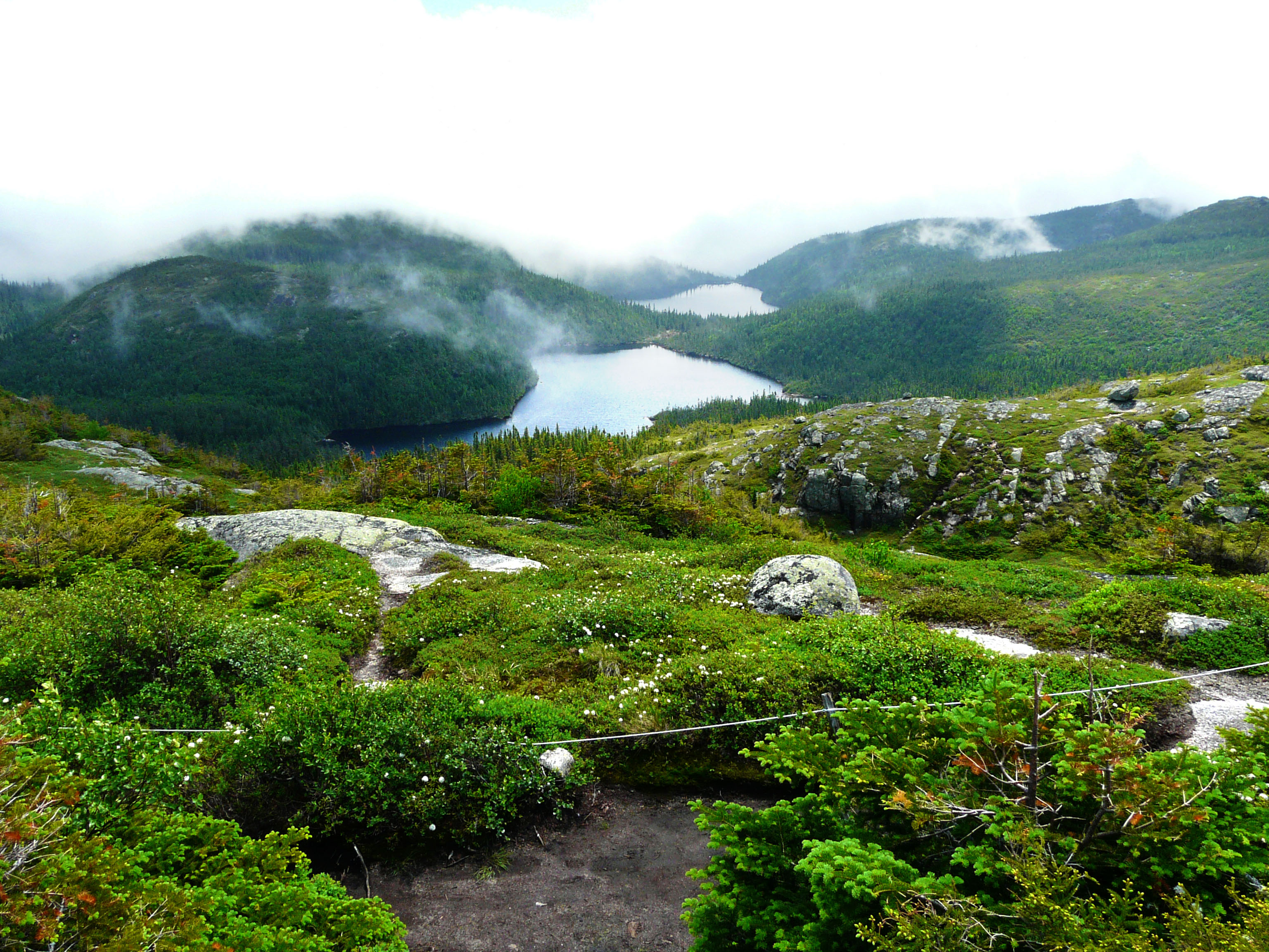
View of the Moucherolle and Pic Maculé lakes, examples of glacial lakes located at the top of the mountain.

The massif contains the Acropole des Draveurs (Raftsmen's Acropolis), a rock face of the mountain overlooking the valley of the Malbaie River, at an elevation higher than 800 m (2,600 ft). There are three "peaks" on the side of this wall. Besides the Acropolis, the mountain is made up of a large hilly plateau where the Pic Chevelu, Pic Maculé and Moucherolle lakes are located among others.

=== Geology ===
The mountain is mainly composed of gneiss charnockitic and migmatite. The barren western escarpment provides a glimpse of the upper layer of the Earth's crust. Although the Laurentian Mountains chain is one of the oldest on Earth and therefore very eroded, large cracks are visible on this summit as well as on the surrounding mountains due to the pressure on the Hautes Gorges fault.

=== Fauna and flora ===
A large part of the mountain is protected by the Grands-Ormes Ecological Reserve because of a maple grove to American elm and black ash, exceptional given its northern location. Also, its treeless summit is covered with alpine tundra and krummholz. This is vulnerable to trampling.

From 2004 to 2012, two to five woodland caribou of the Charlevoix herd occupied its summit, but since 2013, no sightings have been reported.

== History ==
During the Quebec City bid for the 2002 Winter Olympics, the Acropole des Draveurs was approached to host the downhill events, because of its prominence particularly important compared to the other peaks of the massif. However, since there is no infrastructure and the mountain is located in an exceptional natural landscape, the option is not preferred. The project has created reactions from environmental groups, the Charlevoix-Est Regional County Municipality and the Corporation of the Charlevoix Biosphere Reserve. The government decided to protect the region with the creation of Hautes-Gorges-de-la-Rivière-Malbaie National Park in 2000.

== Recreation ==
=== Hiking ===
The Acropole des Draveurs trail, near the Hautes-Gorges-de-la-Rivière-Malbaie National Park, provides access to the top of the mountain. To reach the trails to l'Acropole, hikers must take a bus from the reception. The hike is 10 km round trip with an elevation gain of approximately 800 m (2,600 ft). Restored with stone steps at the beginning of the 2000s to increase its accessibility, it remains among the most demanding in Quebec.

== Gallery ==
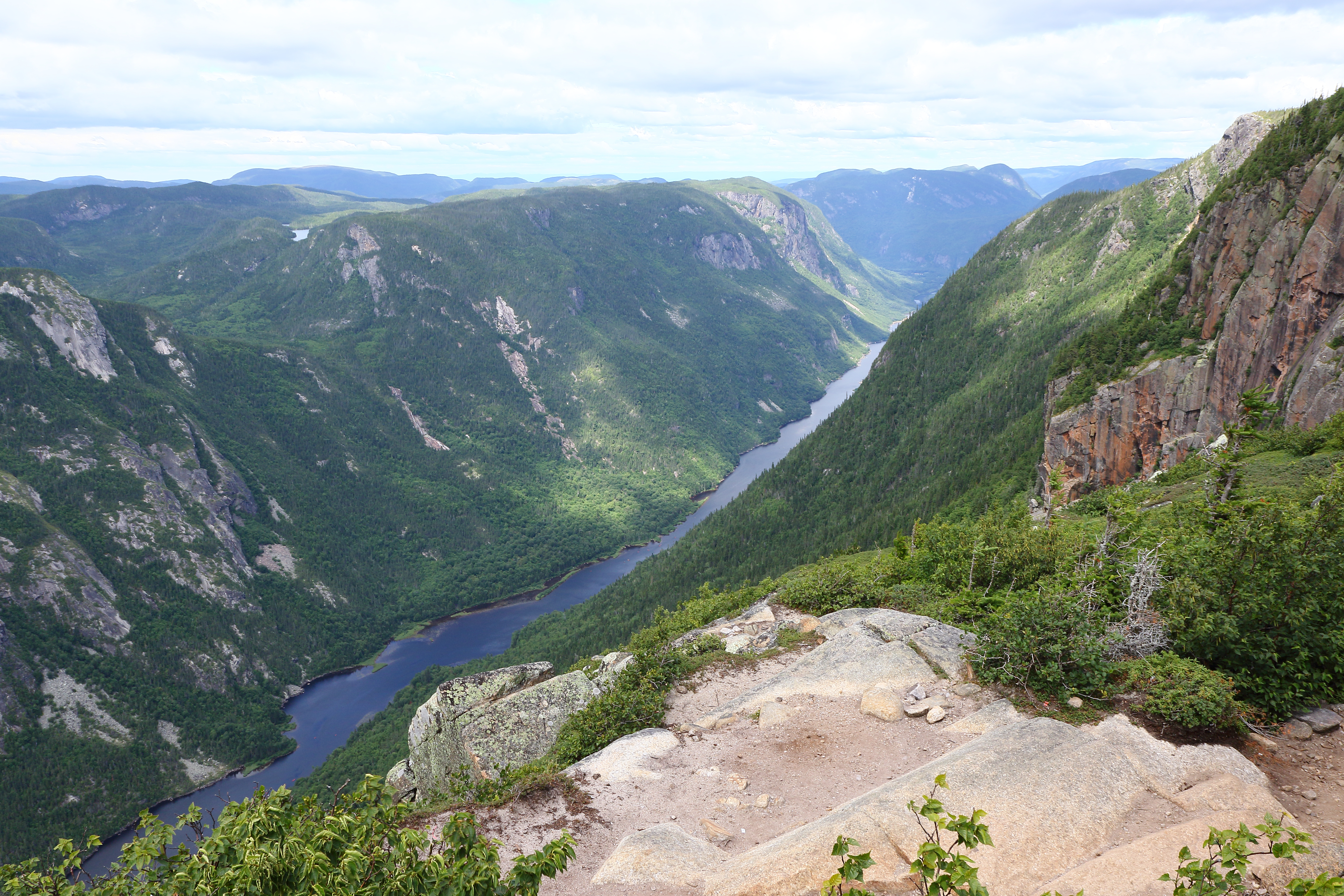
View of the Malbaie River from the top.

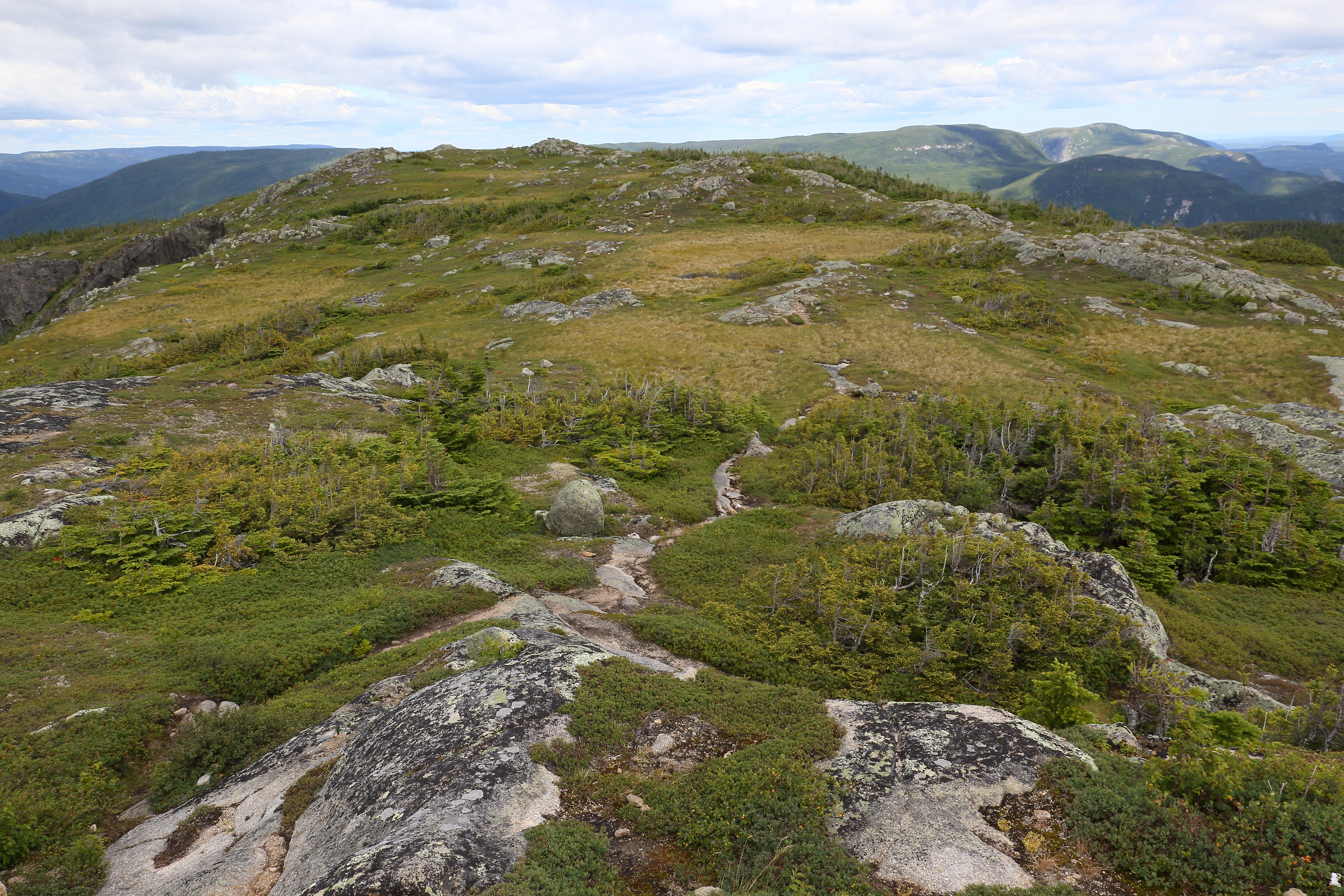
Alpine tundra covers its summit.

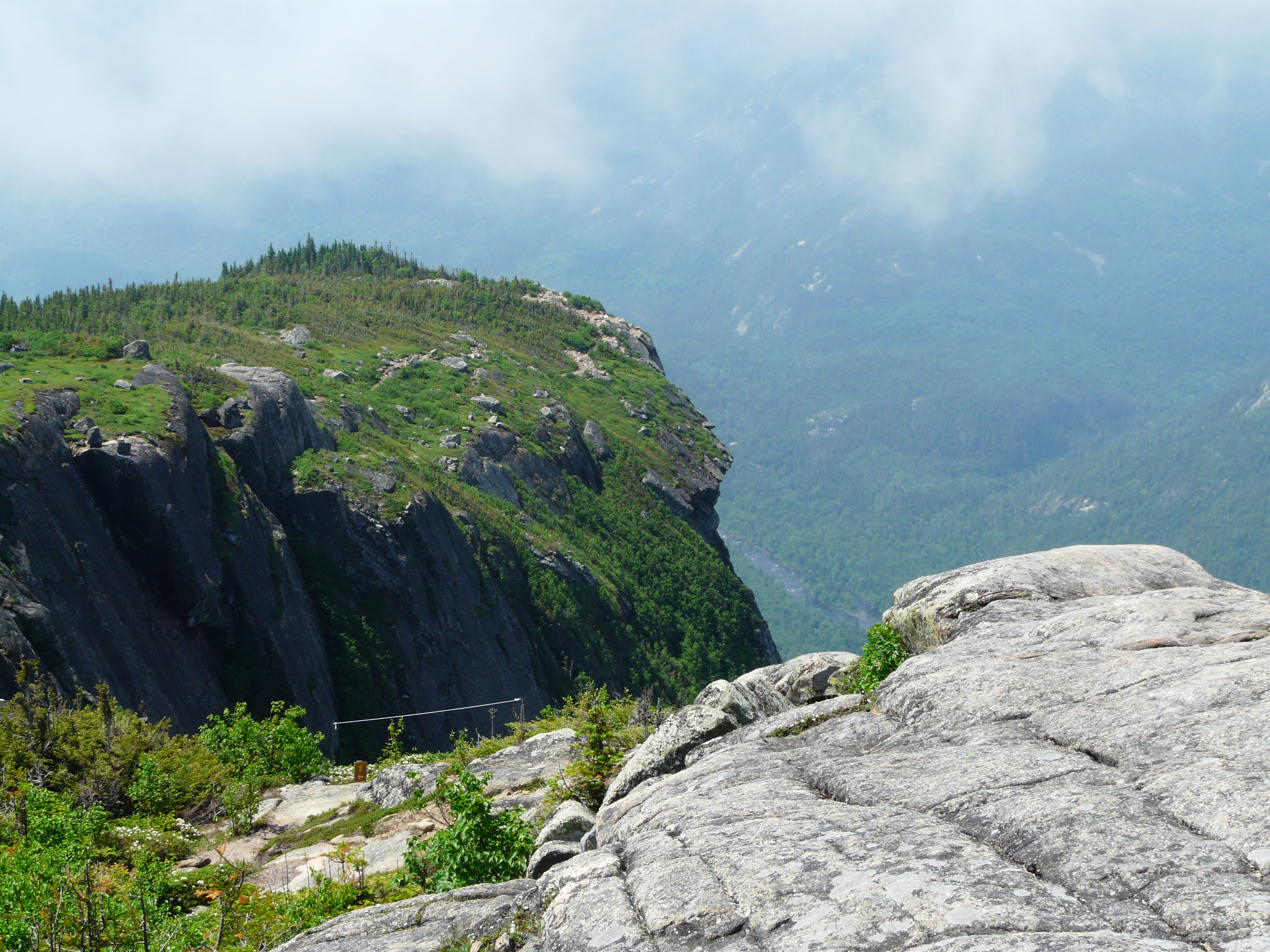
Acropolis of the Draveurs.

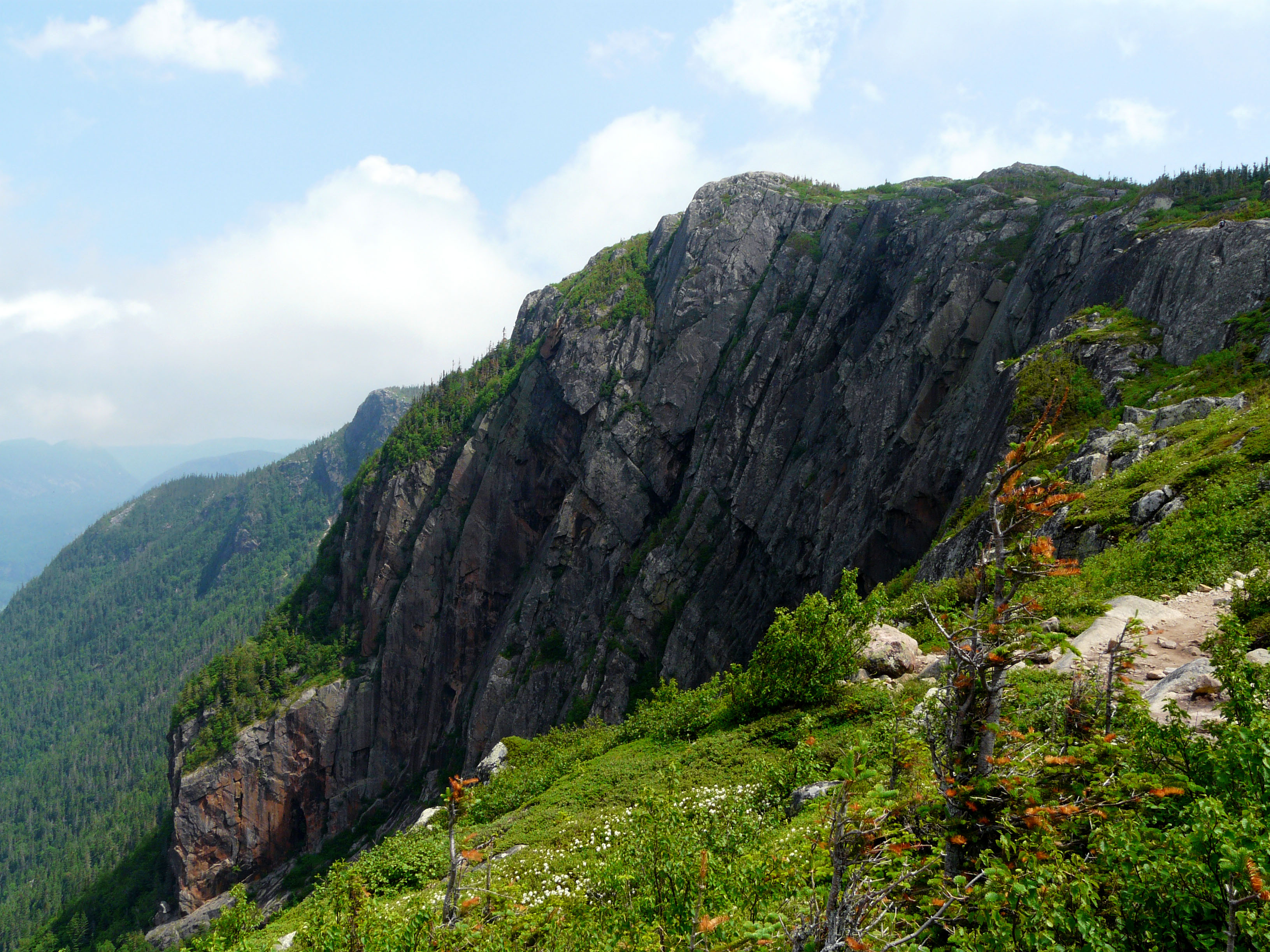
Rock wall.

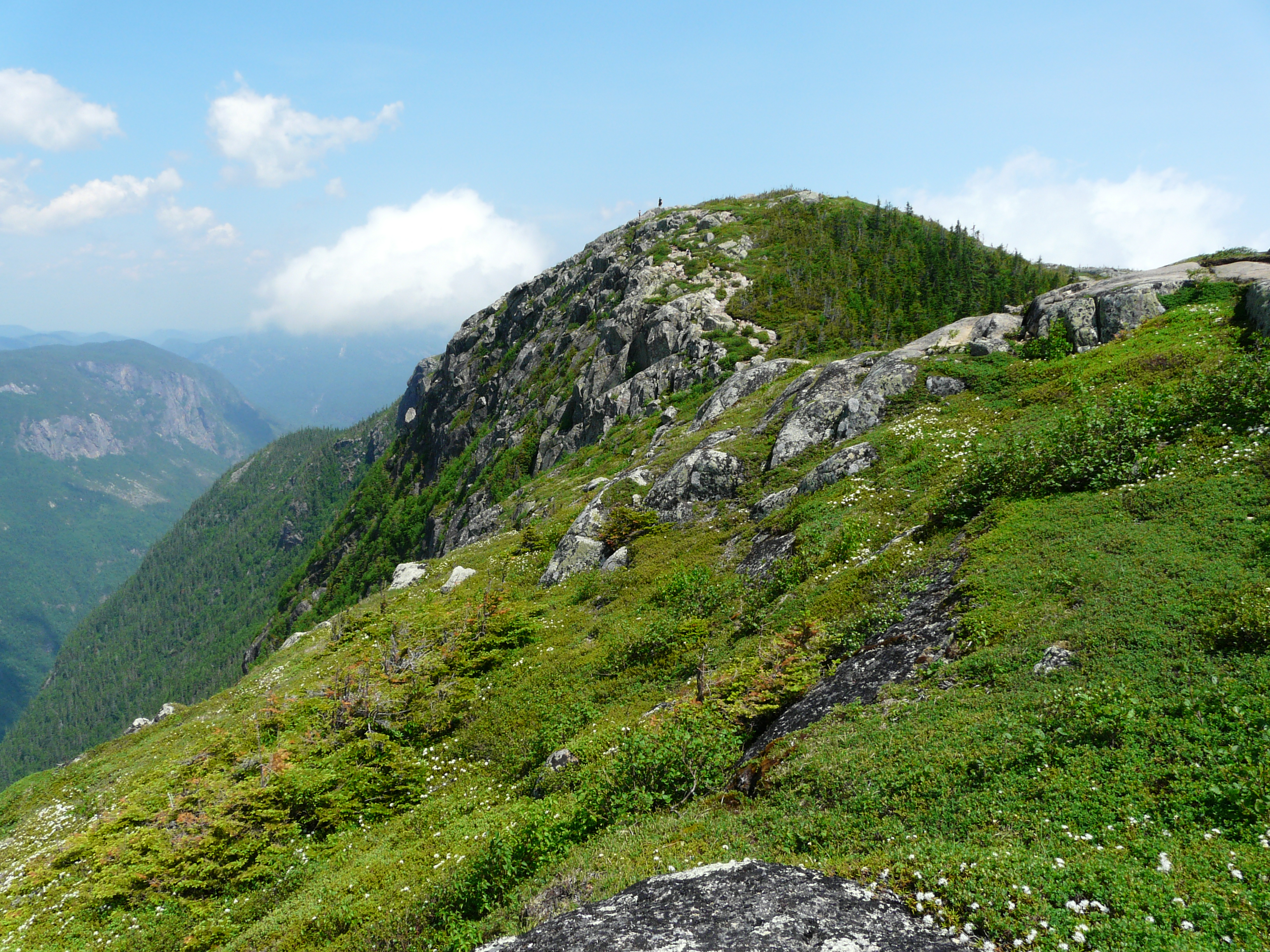
One of the mountain peaks.

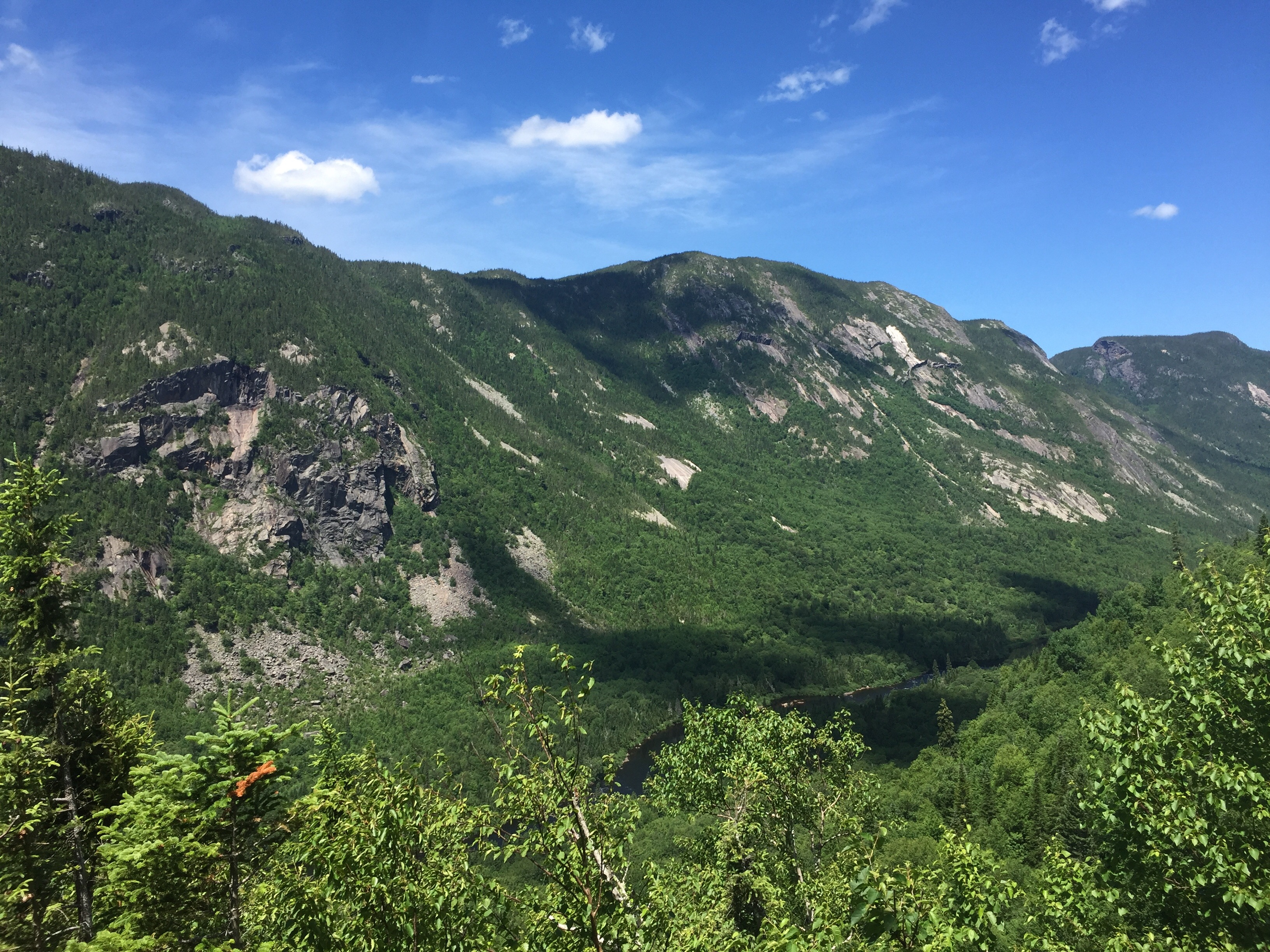
View from the western slopes of the Acropolis des Draveurs.

== See also ==
- Hautes-Gorges-de-la-Rivière-Malbaie National Park
- Grands-Ormes Ecological Reserve
