= Tierra de La Bañeza =

Historical region in Spain

Coordinates: 42°19′N 5°53′W

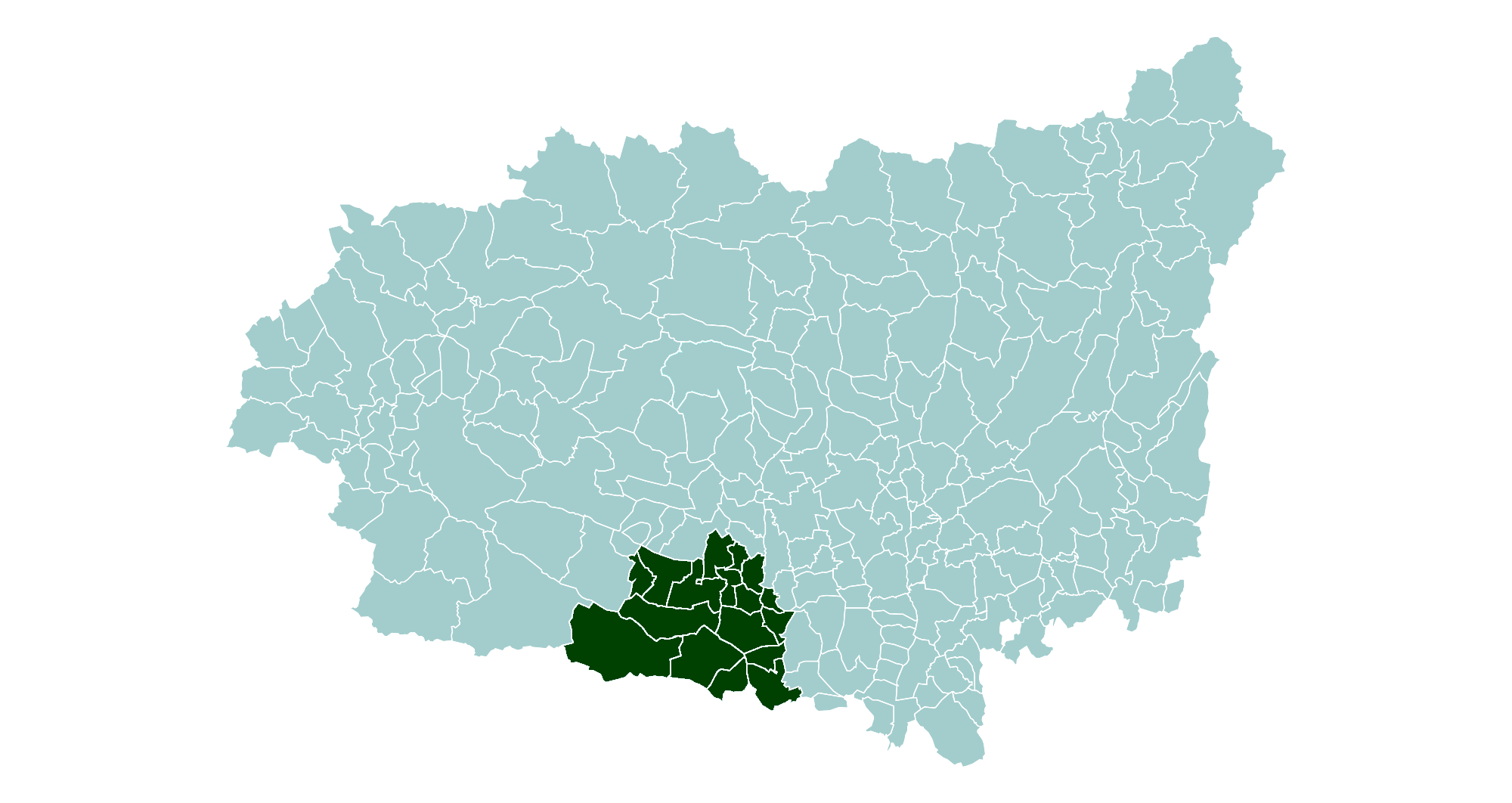
Location of La Tierra de La Bañeza in León Province

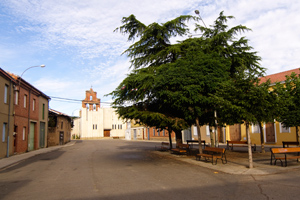
Regueras de Arriba church square.

La Tierra de La Bañeza is a Leonese comarca or historical region whose capital is the city of La Bañeza.

== Minor comarcas ==
La Tierra de La Bañeza has four minor comarcas:

- La Vega del Órbigo-Tuerto, including La Bañeza, three municipalities located on the banks of the Tuerto River, Riego de la Vega, Santa María de la Isla and Soto de la Vega in the north, and two municipalities located on the banks of the Órbigo River, Cebrones del Río and Regueras de Arriba, in the south
- La Valduerna, the valley of Duerna River, with the following municipalities: Castrillo de la Valduerna, Destriana, Palacios de la Valduerna and Villamontán de la Valduerna.
- The comarca of Valdejamuz with the following municipalities: Alija del Infantado, Quintana del Marco, Quintana y Congosto and Santa Elena de Jamuz;
- La Valdería, the valley of Eria River, with the following municipalities: Castrocalbón, Castrocontrigo and San Esteban de Nogales.

== See also ==
- León Province
- La Bañeza
- Kingdom of León
- Leonese language

== Bibliography ==
- María Teresa del Río López, Valentín Cabero Diéguez (1997). La provincia de León y sus comarcas, Volumen XVIII; Tierra de La Bañeza. Diario de León.
