= Ribera del Órbigo =

Region in Castile and León, Spain

- comarca
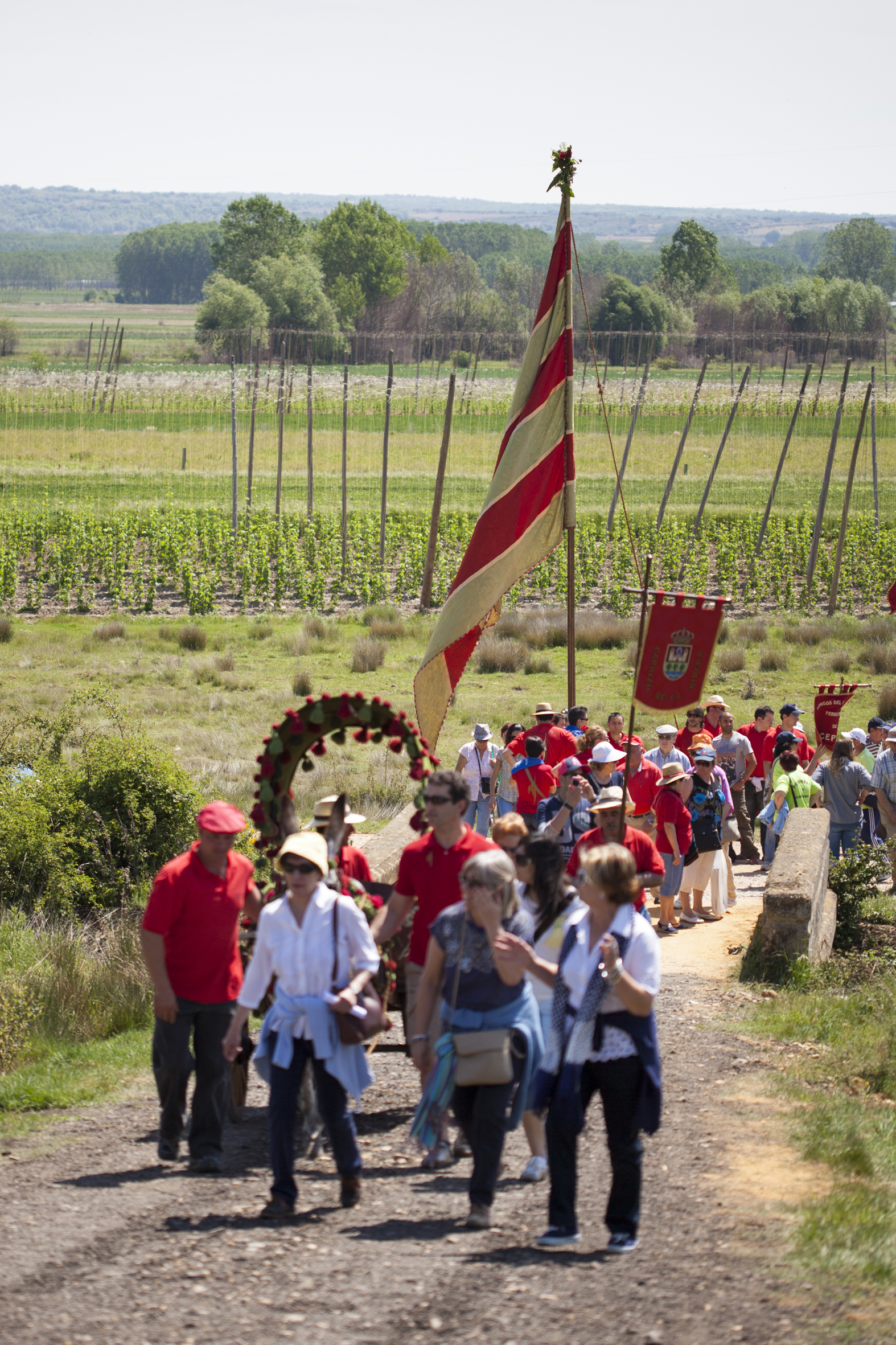
- Pilgrimage of Carrizo de la Ribera
- Interactive map of Ribera del Órbigo
- Country: Spain
- Autonomous Community: Castile and León
- Province of Spain: León

Ribera del Órbigo is a region (Spanish: comarca) located in the León province, Castile and León, Spain.

== Geography ==
The region covers the territory bathed by the waters of the Órbigo River; this rises near Secarejo, fruit of the confluence of the rivers Omaña and Luna, although the northern limits are located somewhat further north and include a brief stretch of the Omaña River. From north to south it covers the municipal areas of Las Omañas, Llamas de la Ribera, Cimanes del Tejar, Carrizo de la Ribera, Turcia, Santa Marina del Rey, Benavides de Órbigo, Villares de Órbigo, Hospital de Órbigo and Villarejo de Órbigo.

== History ==
Waters of the river and the different canals that have been built since the Middle Ages. It favored a rich and varied agriculture that has traditionally developed and favored the settlement of urban centers with a more or less stable population. The geographical and economic characteristics of the valley contributed to the formation of the regional identity.

Formerly it was an archpriest Diocese of Astorga, within the archdeaconry of Ribas del Sil. As an exception, the places in the municipality of Las Omañas, which belonged to the Archdiocese of Oviedo, archpriest of Ordás, and the towns of La Milla del Río, Quiñones del Río and Velilla de la Reina, who were from León.

== Culture ==
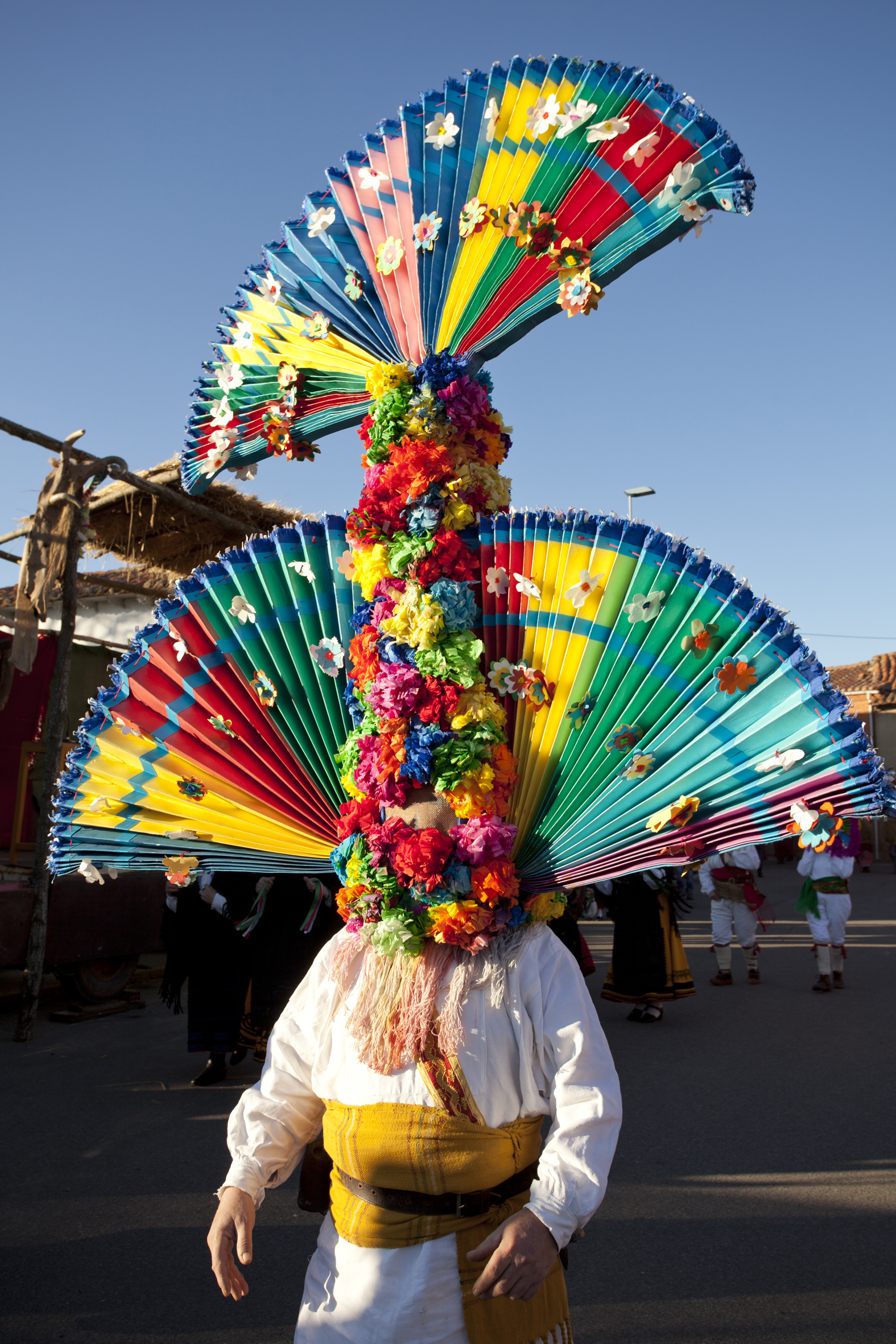
Antruejo of Velilla de la Reina

=== Festivals ===
The antruejos or traditional carnivals are one of the most important festivities in the Ribera del Órbigo. The word antruejo has its origin in the old Leonese word entroydo, which referred to the entrance of Lent.

The origin of the antruejo is unknown, although it could be associated with the Saturnalia, Calends and, mainly, the Lupercales, celebrated in honor of the god Faun Luperco , all of them celebrations of ancient Rome in which, among other rituals, animals considered impure were sacrificed and later dressed in their skins and impregnated with their blood as a symbol of purification and fertility in preparation for spring.

At the beginning of the Middle Ages they began to assimilate to Christianity through carnival as a prelude to the recollection and penance of Lent. From this process of syncretism come numerous features of the antruejos that have been preserved, among which those of Velilla de la Reina and Llamas de la Ribera stand out, both declared Festival of Provincial Tourist Interest, and that of Villamor de Órbigo.

=== Gastronomy ===
Typical dishes include, trout soup, made with trouts, paprika, bread, garlic and salt . Among the traditional pastries are common donuts, almonds, mazapanes, ears, puff pastries and sequillos, and lemonade in terms of drinks.

== See also ==
- Omaña
- Órbigo River
