= Valdefresno =

Coordinates: 42°36′N 5°29′W

Valdefresno / Valdefreisnu
- municipality
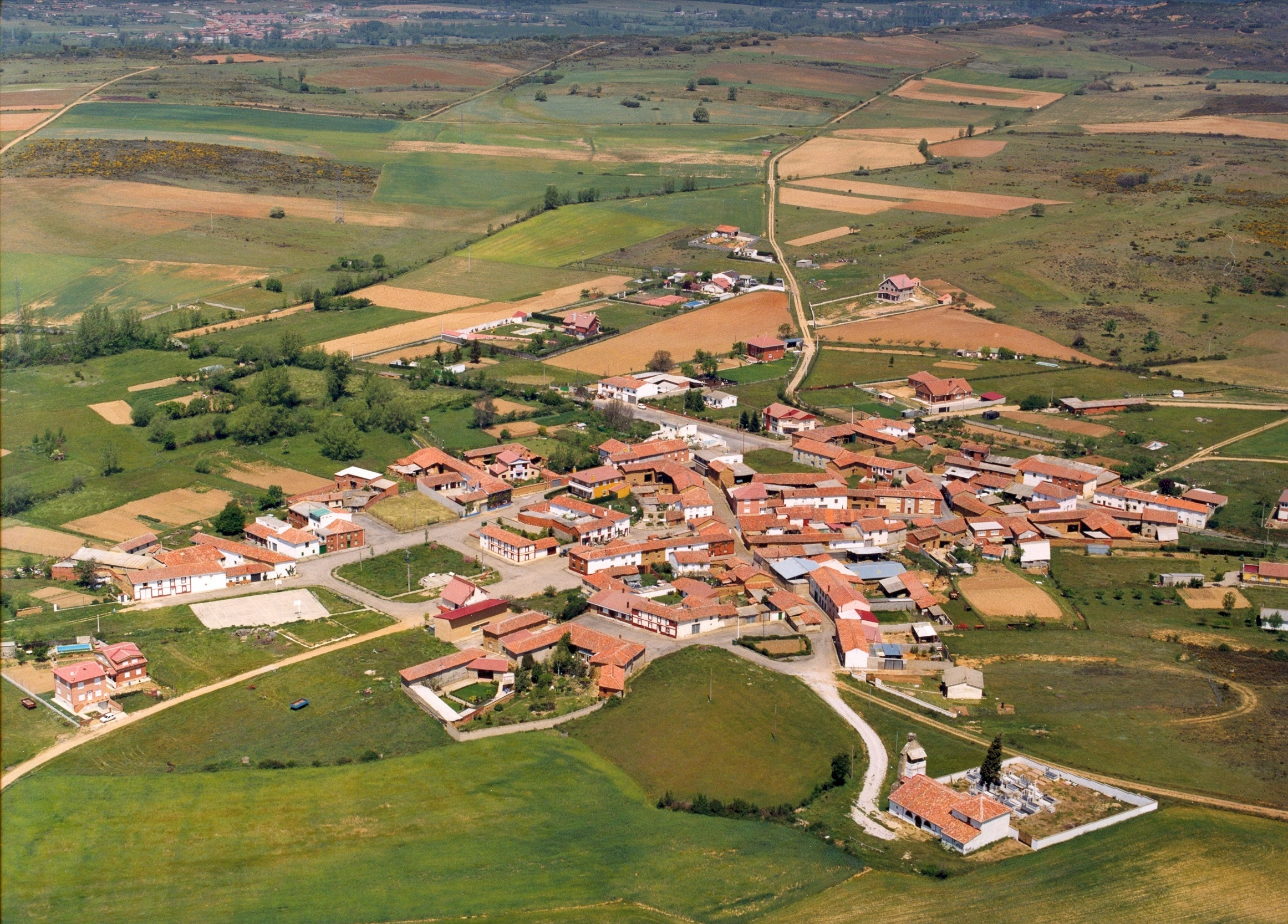

- Coat of arms
- Interactive map of Valdefresno / Valdefreisnu
- Country: Spain
- Autonomous community: Castile and León
- Province: León
- Municipality: Valdefresno

Area
  - Total: 102 km^{2} (39 sq mi)

Population (2025-01-01)
  - Total: 2,362
  - Density: 23.2/km^{2} (60.0/sq mi)
- Time zone: UTC+1 (CET)
  - Summer (DST): UTC+2 (CEST)

Valdefresno (in Leonese language Valdefreisnu) is a municipality located in the province of León, Castile and León, Spain. According to the 2004 census (INE), the municipality has a population of 1,893 inhabitants.
