= Vallecillo, León =

Coordinates: 42°21′N 5°12′W

Valecillo
- Municipality
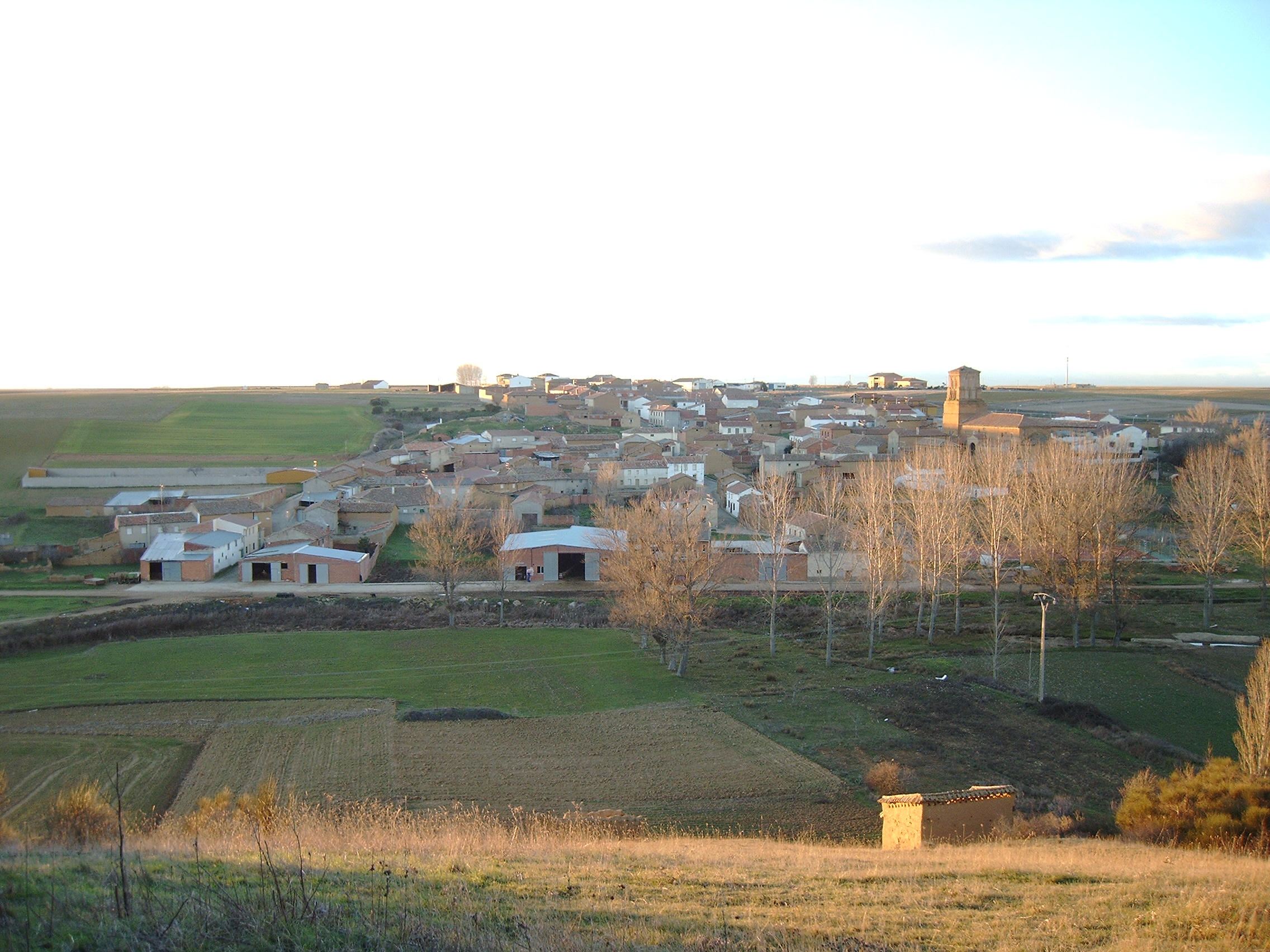
- Aerial view of vallecillo
- Interactive map of Valecillo

Vallecillo is a municipality in the province of León, Spain. It is located in the autonomous community of Leon and Castile.

== Geography ==
Vallecillo is located in the northern part of the Iberian Peninsula's central plateau (Meseta), at an elevation of about 835 metres. It is approximately 55 km from the provincial capital, León. The municipality has a continental Mediterranean climate, with cool winters and relatively warm summers. Annual precipitation is relatively low, at around 550 mm, and is distributed throughout most of the year, although rainfall is scarce during the summer months.
