= Urdiales del Páramo =

Coordinates: 42°22′N 5°46′W

Urdiales del Páramo, Spain
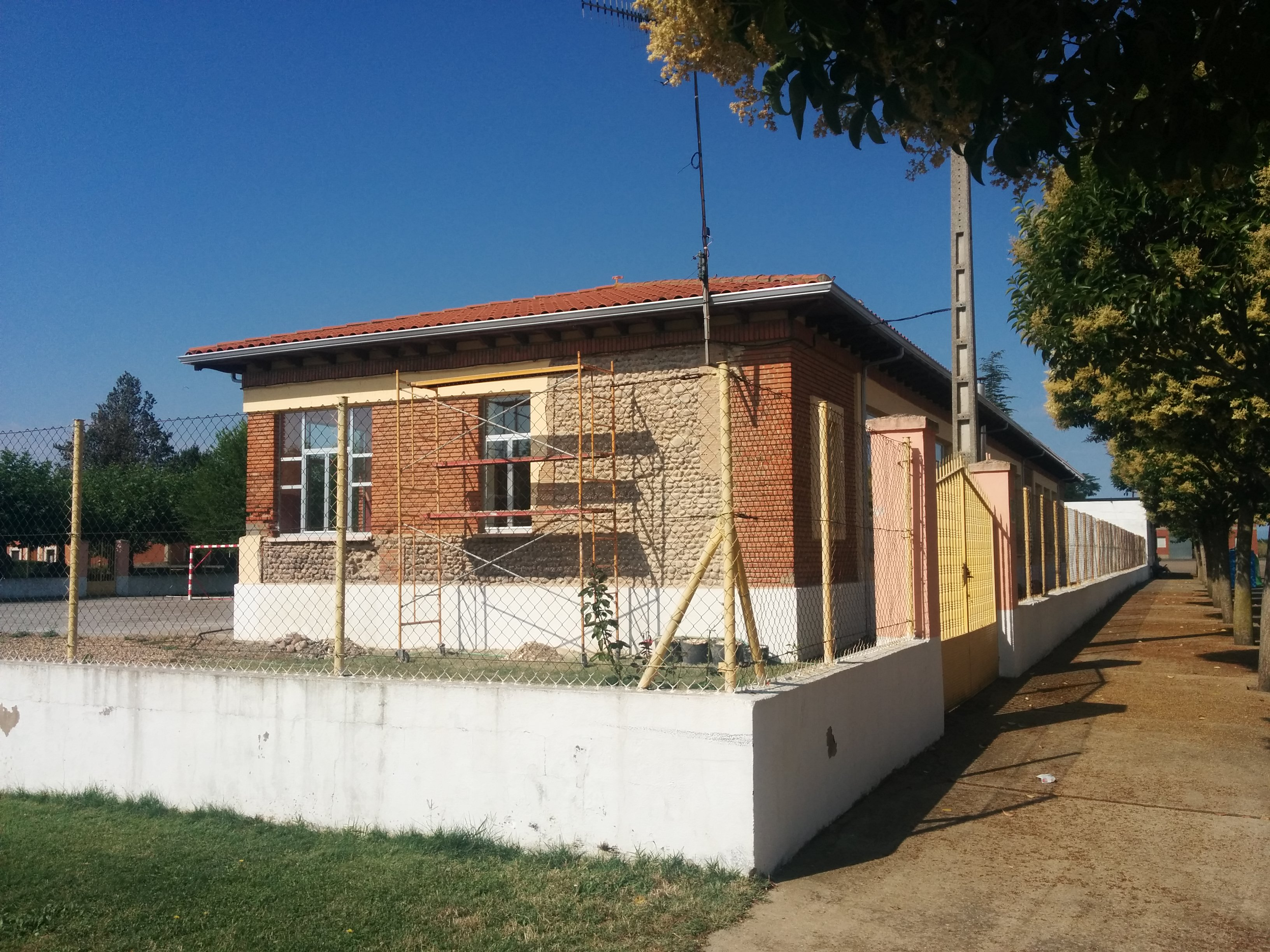
- School side in Urdiales del Páramo

- Flag Coat of arms
- Interactive map of Urdiales del Páramo, Spain
- Country: Spain
- Autonomous community: Castile and León
- Province: León
- Municipality: Urdiales del Páramo

Area
  - Total: 32 km^{2} (12 sq mi)

Population (2025-01-01)
  - Total: 445
  - Density: 14/km^{2} (36/sq mi)
- Time zone: UTC+1 (CET)
  - Summer (DST): UTC+2 (CEST)

Urdiales del Páramo is a municipality located in the province of León, Castile and León, Spain. According to the 2004 census (INE), the municipality has a population of 614 inhabitants.
