= Santa Cristina de Valmadrigal =

- municipality
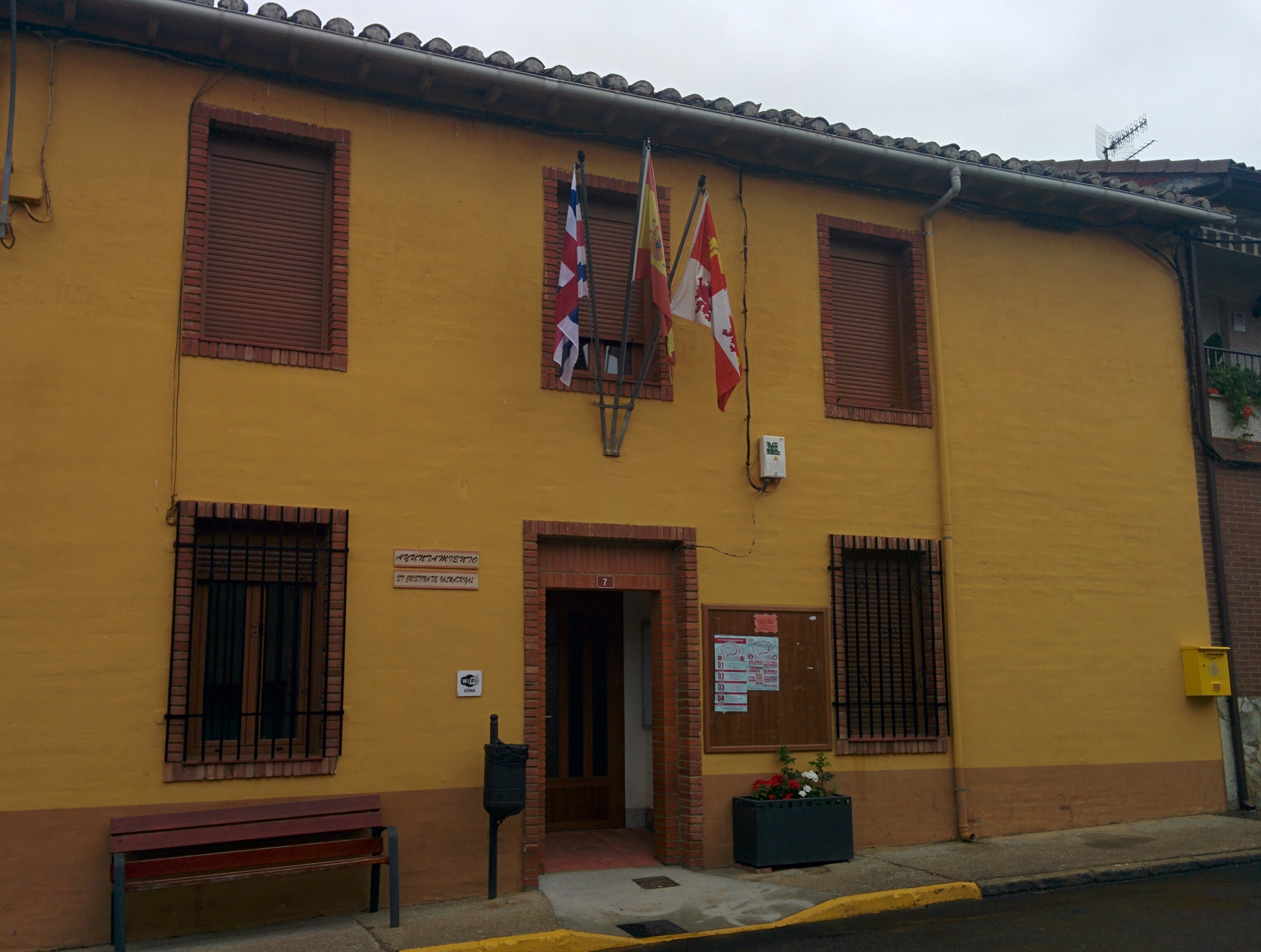
- Town hall

- Flag Coat of arms

- Location in Spain.
- Coordinates: 42°21′23″N 5°18′37″W
- Country: Spain
- Autonomous community: Castile and León
- Province: León
- Municipality: Tierra de Sahagún

Government
  - Mayor: Ceferino Revilla González

Area
  - Total: 40 km^{2} (15 sq mi)
- Elevation: 815 m (2,674 ft)

Population (2025-01-01)
  - Total: 278
  - Density: 7.0/km^{2} (18/sq mi)
- Time zone: UTC+1 (CET)
  - Summer (DST): UTC+2 (CEST)

Santa Cristina de Valmadrigal is a municipality located in the province of León, Castile and León, Spain.
