= Valdefuentes del Páramo =

Coordinates: 42°19′N 5°50′W

Valdefuentes del Páramo, Spain
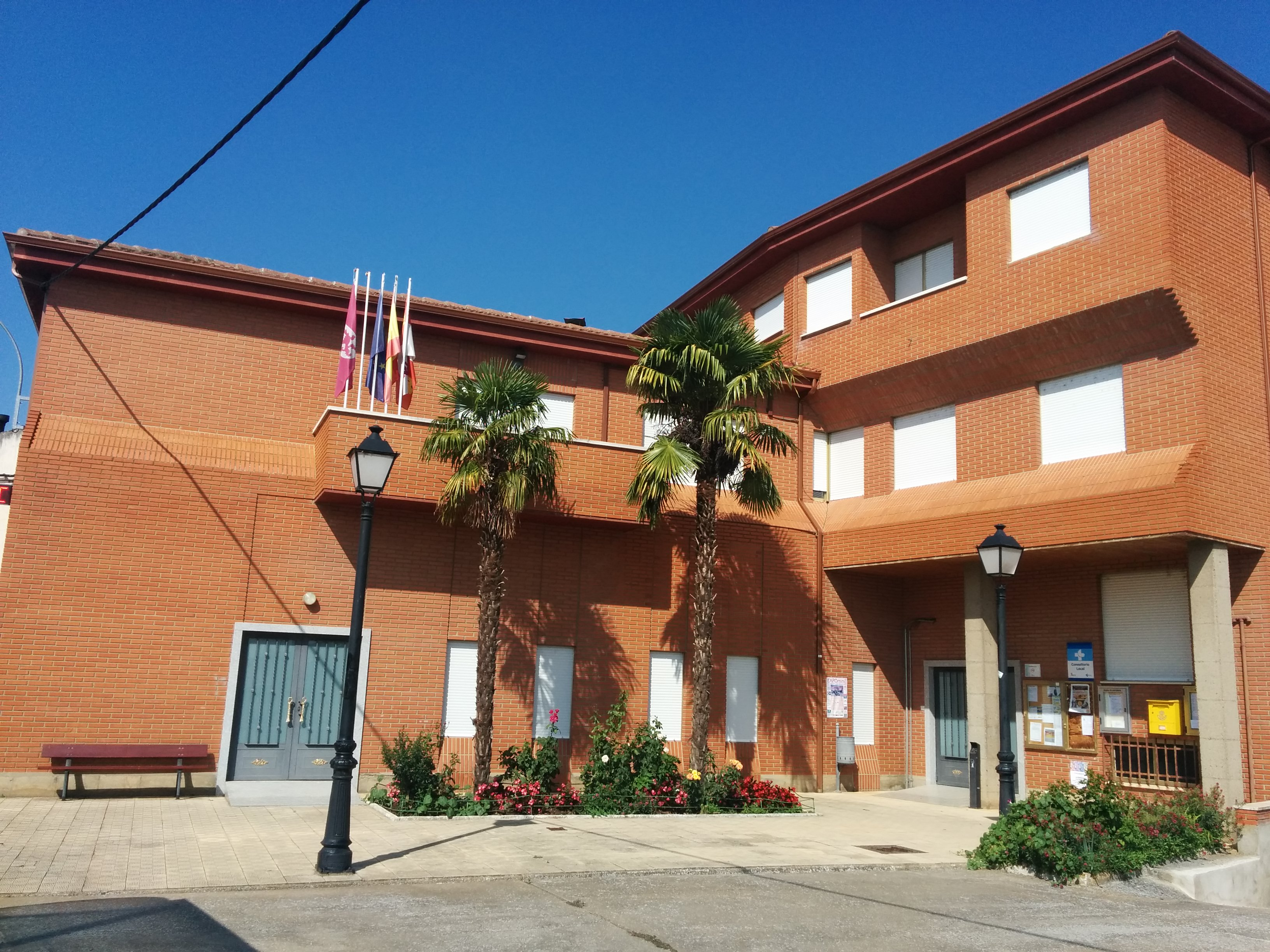
- Town Hall of Valdefuentes del Páramo

- Coat of arms
- Interactive map of Valdefuentes del Páramo, Spain
- Country: Spain
- Autonomous community: Castile and León
- Province: León
- Municipality: Valdefuentes del Páramo

Area
  - Total: 23 km^{2} (8.9 sq mi)
- Elevation: 788 m (2,585 ft)

Population (2025-01-01)
  - Total: 304
  - Density: 13/km^{2} (34/sq mi)
- Time zone: UTC+1 (CET)
  - Summer (DST): UTC+2 (CEST)
- Website: http://www.valdefuentesdelparamo.com

Valdefuentes del Páramo is a municipality located in the province of León, Castile and León, Spain. According to the 2004 census (INE), the municipality has a population of 388 inhabitants.
