= Valverde-Enrique =

Coordinates: 42°18′N 5°18′W

Valverde-Enrique, Spain
- municipality
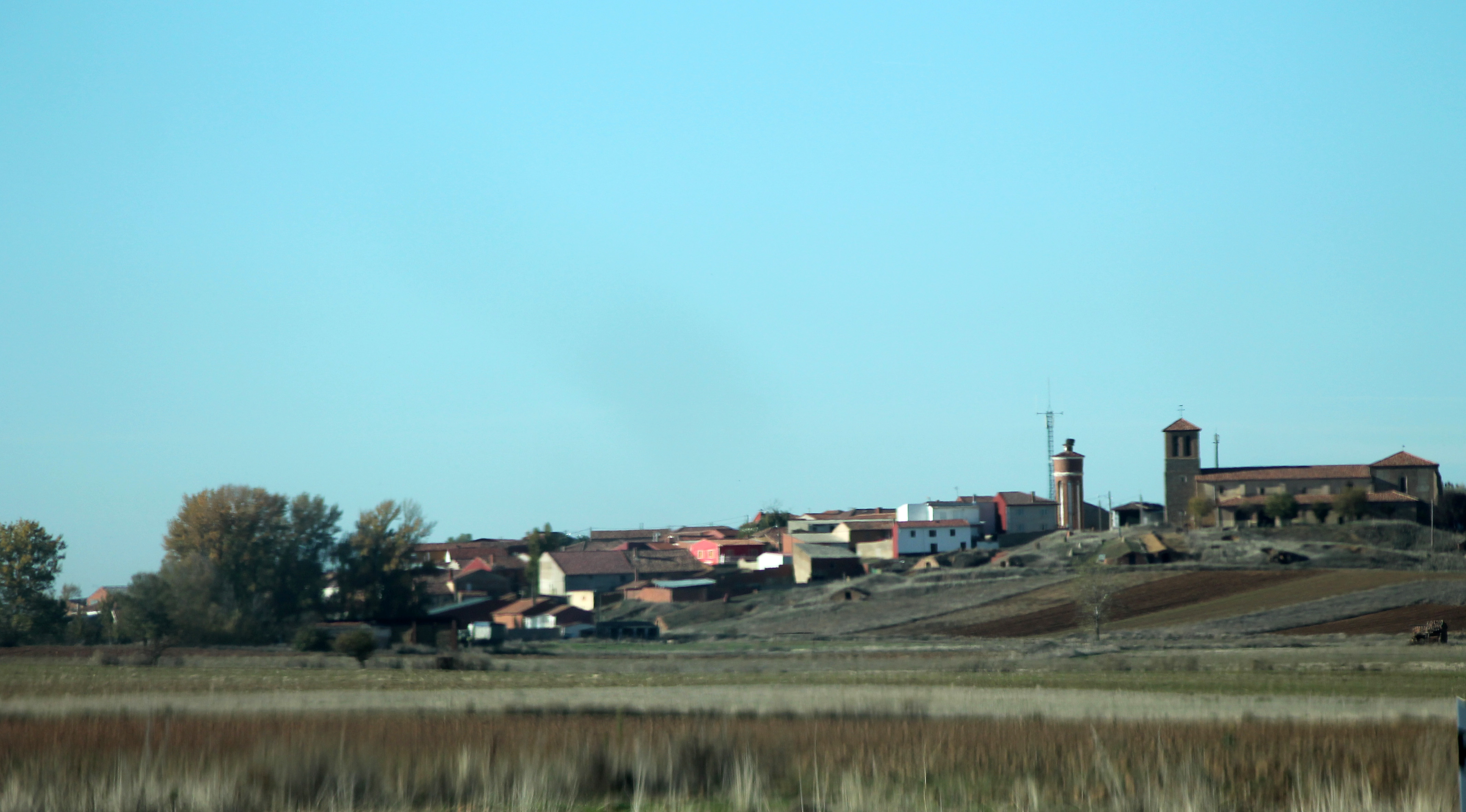
- View of Vista de Valverde Enrique

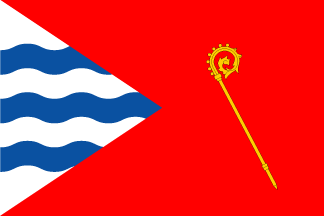
- Flag Coat of arms
- Interactive map of Valverde-Enrique, Spain
- Country: Spain
- Autonomous community: Castile and León
- Province: León
- Municipality: Valverde-Enrique

Area
  - Total: 35.90 km^{2} (13.86 sq mi)

Population (2025-01-01)
  - Total: 148
  - Density: 4.12/km^{2} (10.7/sq mi)
- Time zone: UTC+1 (CET)
  - Summer (DST): UTC+2 (CEST)

Valverde-Enrique is a municipality located in the province of León, Castile and León, Spain. According to the 2004 census (INE), the municipality had a population of 208 inhabitants.
