= San Justo de la Vega =

- Municipality
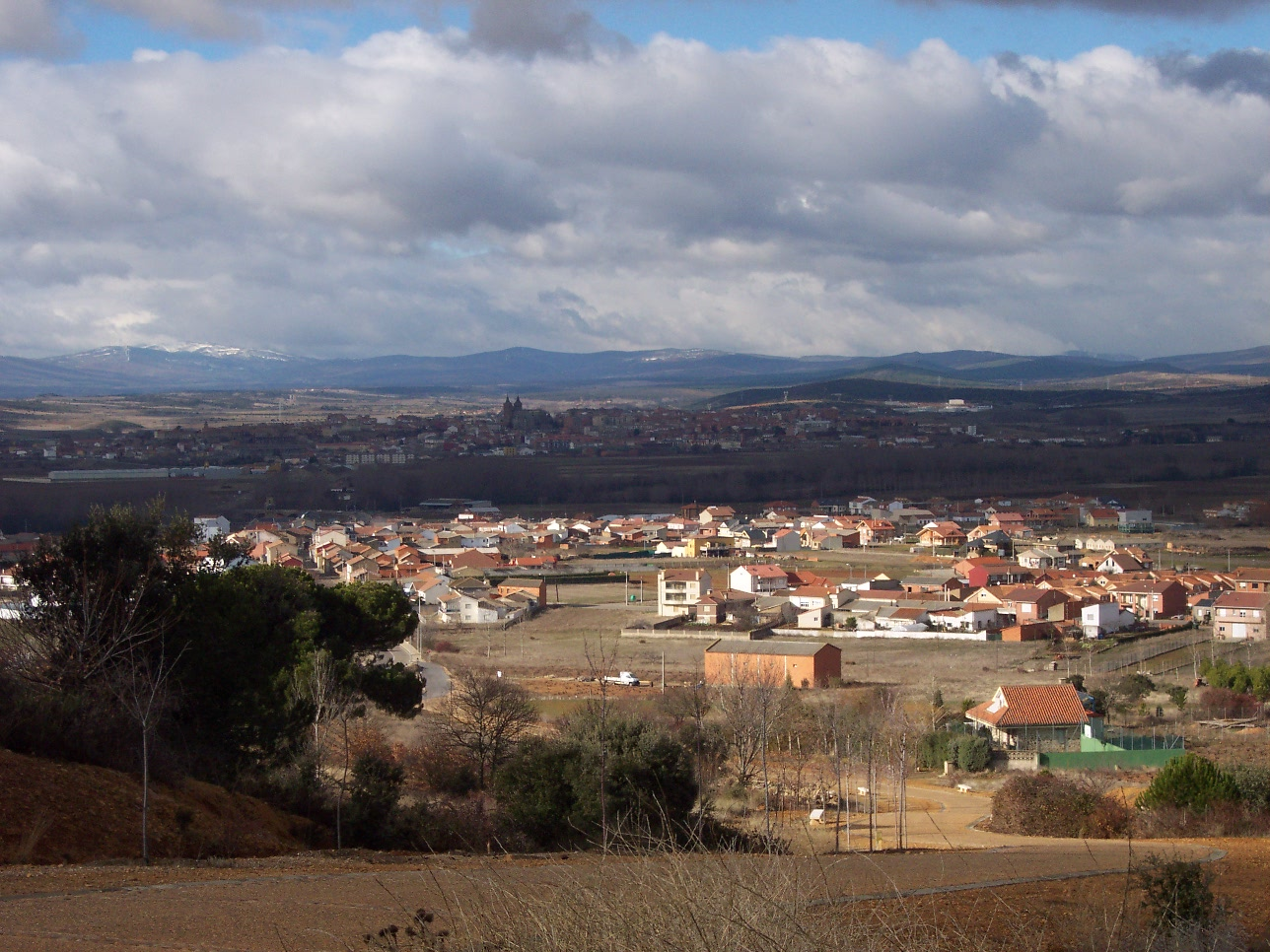
- San Justo de la Vega, taken from Crucero

- Flag Coat of arms

- Location within Spain
- Coordinates: 42°27′15″N 6°00′53″W
- Country: Spain
- Community: Castile and León
- Province: León
- Comarca: La Vega del Tuerto

Government
  - Mayor: Juan Carlos Rodríguez Rubio

Area
  - Total: 48.39 km^{2} (18.68 sq mi)
- Elevation: 845 m (2,772 ft)

Population (2025-01-01)
  - Total: 1,750
  - Density: 36.2/km^{2} (93.7/sq mi)
- Demonym: Sanjustino/a
- Time zone: UTC+1 (CET)
  - Summer (DST): UTC+2 (CEST)
- Postal code: 24710

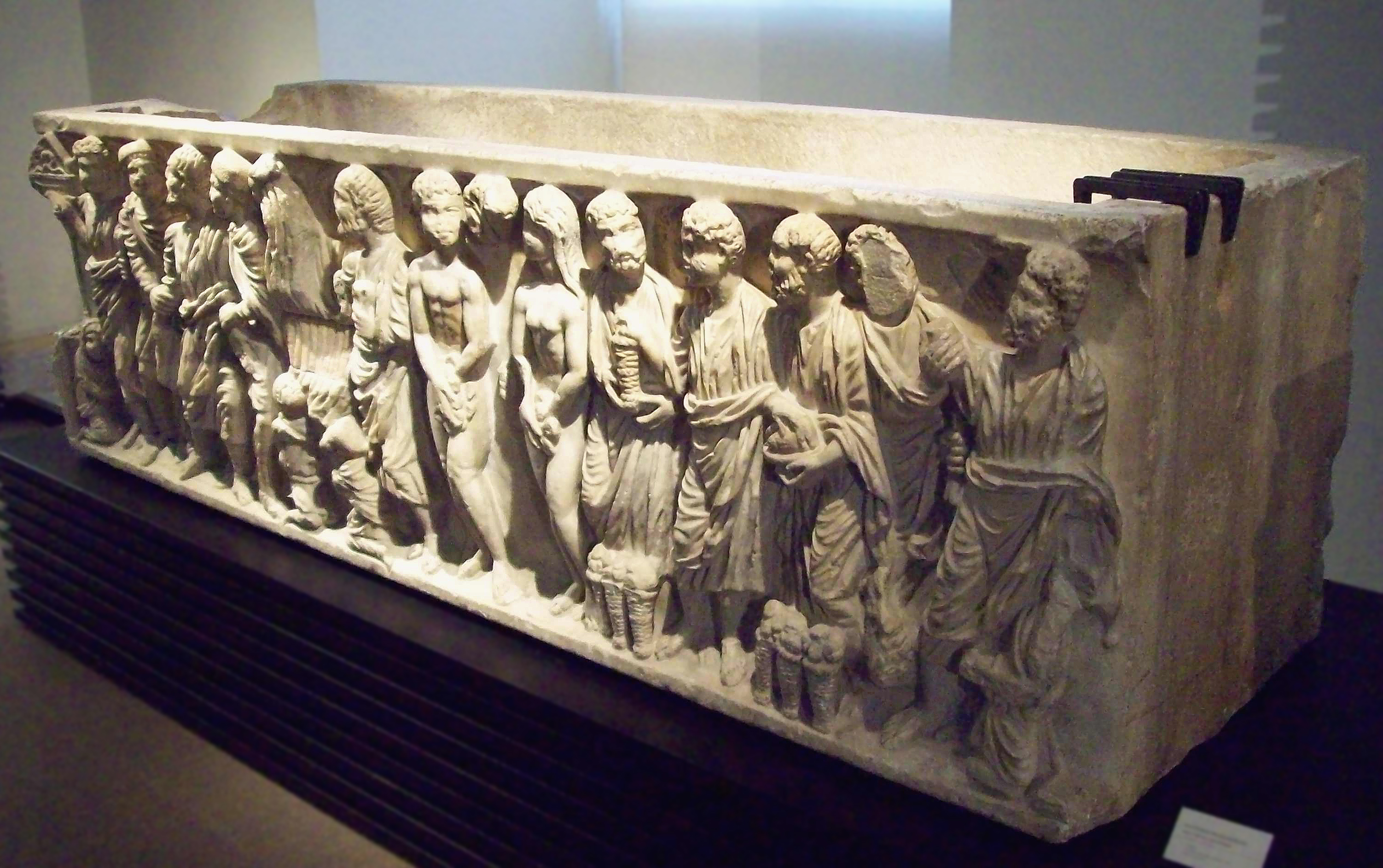
The Palaeo-Christian sarcophagus found in San Justo, later moved to the Cathedral of Astorga and now in the National Archaeological Museum of Spain, Madrid.

San Justo de la Vega (Spanish pronunciation: [saŋ ˈxusto ðe la ˈβeɣa]; Leonese: San Xustu la Veiga) is a municipality located in the province of León, Castile and León, northern Spain. According to the 2025 census (INE), the municipality has a population of 1,750 inhabitants. The town is crossed by the León-Monforte de Lemos railway.
