= Garrafe de Torío =

Garrafe de Torío, Spain
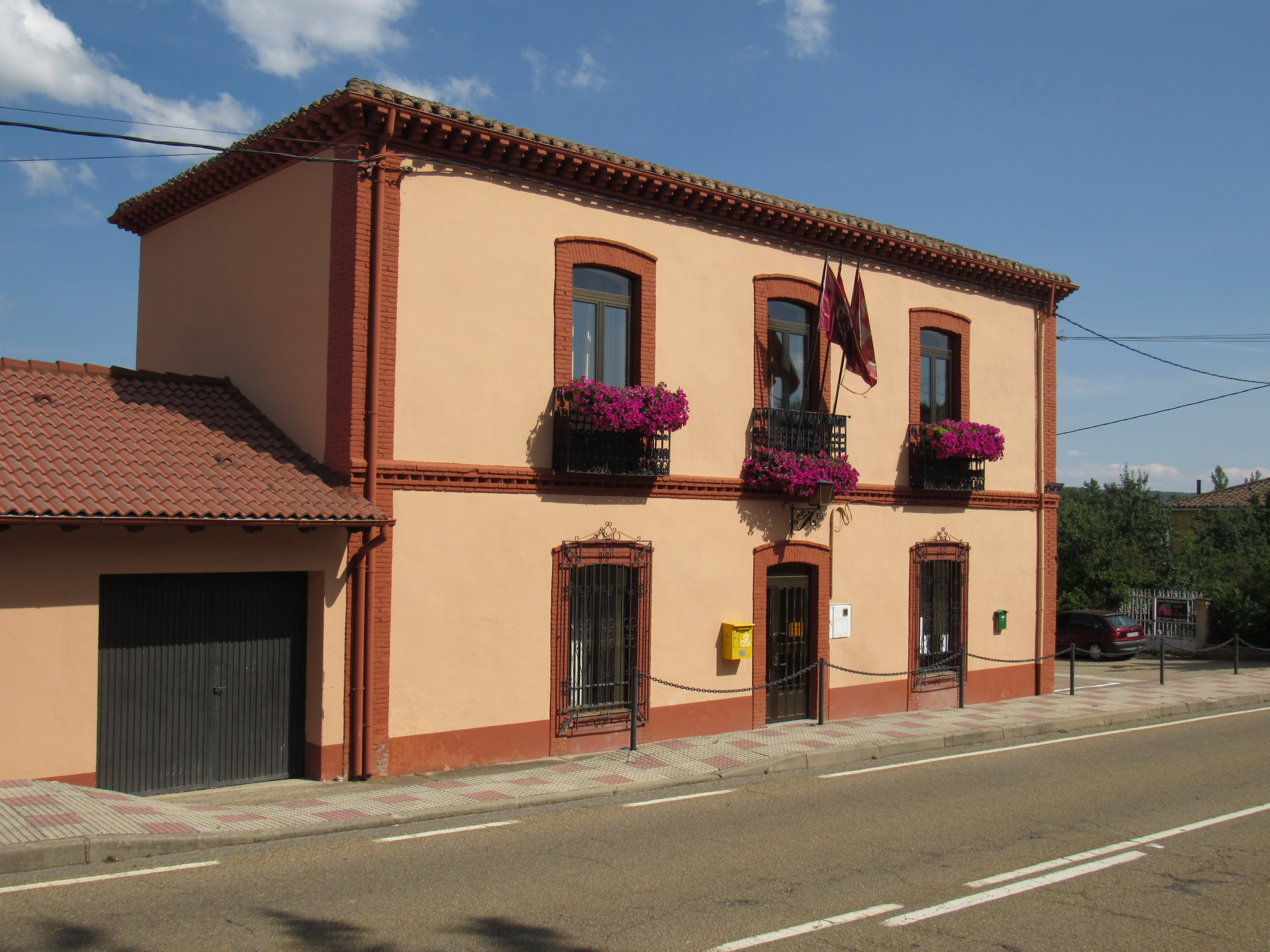
- Town hall

- Coat of arms

- Location within Spain
- Coordinates: 42°41′26″N 5°32′20″W
- Country: Spain
- Autonomous community: Castile and León
- Province: León
- Municipality: Garrafe de Torío

Government
  - Mayor: María del Carmen González Guinda (PP)

Area
  - Total: 125.27 km^{2} (48.37 sq mi)
- Elevation: 920 m (3,020 ft)

Population (2025-01-01)
  - Total: 1,649
  - Density: 13.16/km^{2} (34.09/sq mi)
- Demonym: garrafense
- Time zone: UTC+1 (CET)
  - Summer (DST): UTC+2 (CEST)
- Postal Code: 24891
- Telephone prefix: 987
- Website: Ayto. de Garrafe de Torío

Garrafe de Torío (Spanish pronunciation: [ɡaˈrafe ðe toˈɾi.o]) is a municipality located in the province of León, Castile and León, Spain. According to the 2010 census (INE), the municipality has a population of 1,267 inhabitants.
