= Corbillos de los Oteros =

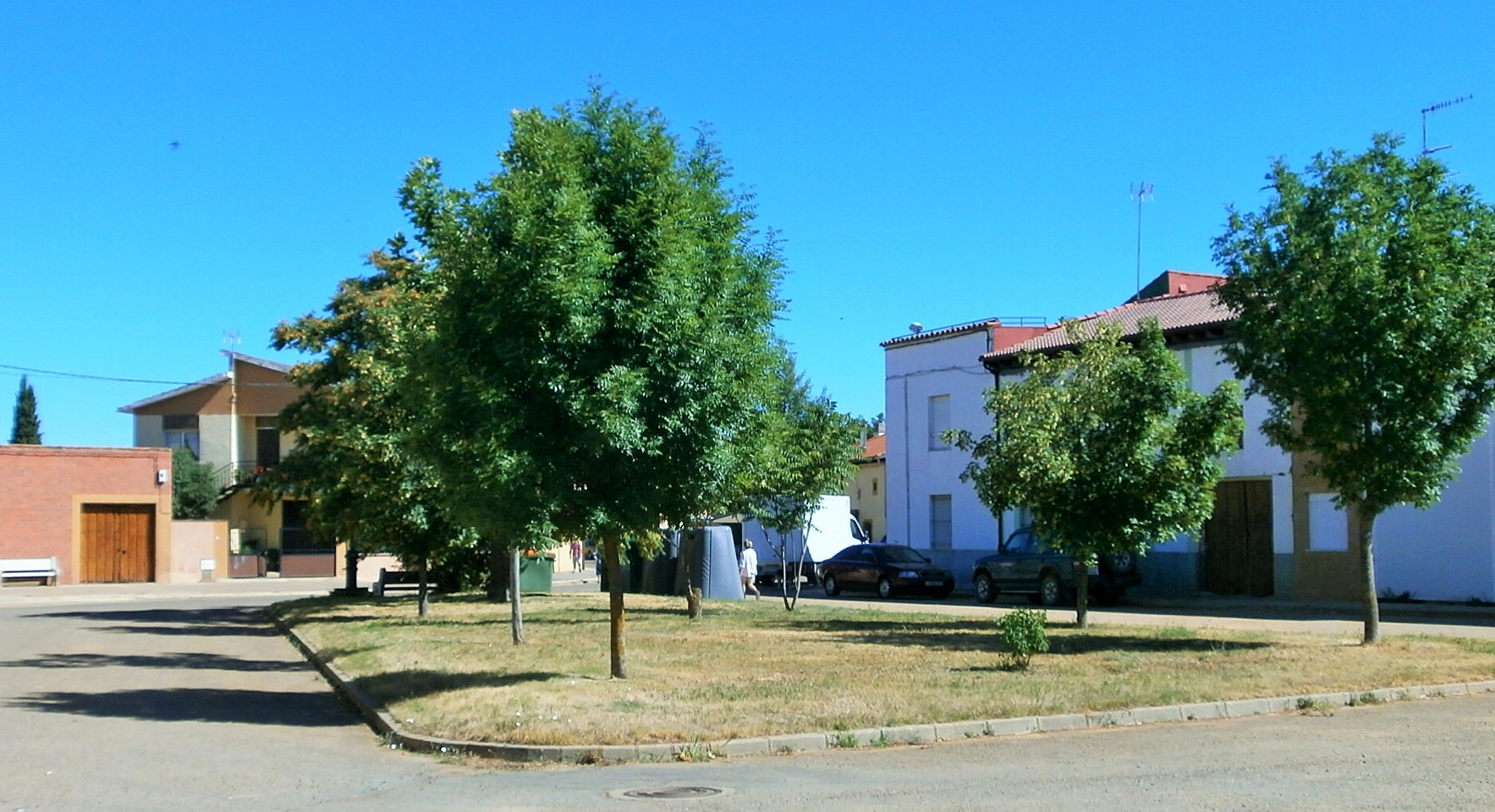
- A park in Corbillos de los Oteros

- Location within Spain
- Coordinates: 42°24′48″N 5°27′33″W
- Country: Spain
- Autonomous community: Castile and León
- Province: León
- Municipality: Corbillos de los Oteros

Government
  - Mayor: José Antonio Santamarta González (UPL)

Area
  - Total: 31.80 km^{2} (12.28 sq mi)
- Elevation: 797 m (2,615 ft)

Population (2025-01-01)
  - Total: 174
  - Density: 5.47/km^{2} (14.2/sq mi)
- Time zone: UTC+1 (CET)
  - Summer (DST): UTC+2 (CEST)
- Postal Code: 24225
- Telephone prefix: 987
- Climate: Cfb

Corbillos de los Oteros (Spanish pronunciation: [koɾˈβiʎos ðe los oˈteɾos]; Leonese: Curbiellos de los Outeiros) is a municipality located in the province of León, Castile and León, Spain. According to the 2025 census (INE), the municipality has a population of 174 inhabitants.

== See also ==
- Tierra de Campos
