= Matadeón de los Oteros =

Coordinates: 42°20′N 5°22′W

Matadeón de los Oteros, Spain
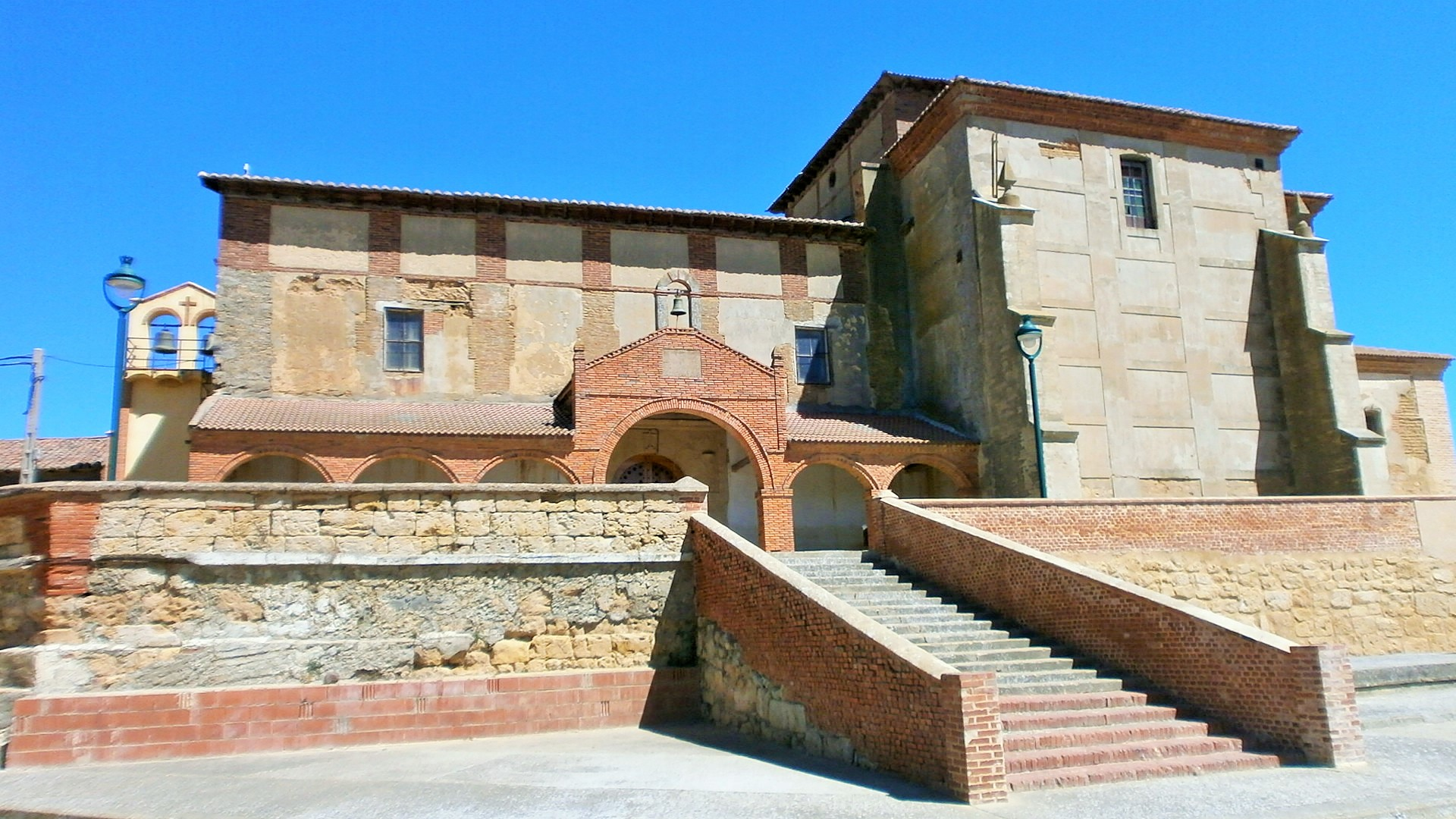
- Parish church of Matadeón de los Oteros

- Flag Coat of arms
- Interactive map of Matadeón de los Oteros, Spain
- Country: Spain
- Autonomous community: Castile and León
- Province: León
- Municipality: Matadeón de los Oteros

Area
  - Total: 46 km^{2} (18 sq mi)

Population (2025-01-01)
  - Total: 212
  - Density: 4.6/km^{2} (12/sq mi)
- Time zone: UTC+1 (CET)
  - Summer (DST): UTC+2 (CEST)
- Climate: Cfb

Matadeón de los Oteros (Matadïón de los Outeiros in Leonese language) is a municipality located in the province of León, Castile and León, Spain. According to the 2025 census (INE), the municipality has a population of 212 inhabitants.
