= San Millán de los Caballeros =

Coordinates: 42°17′N 5°33′W

San Millán de los Caballeros, Spain
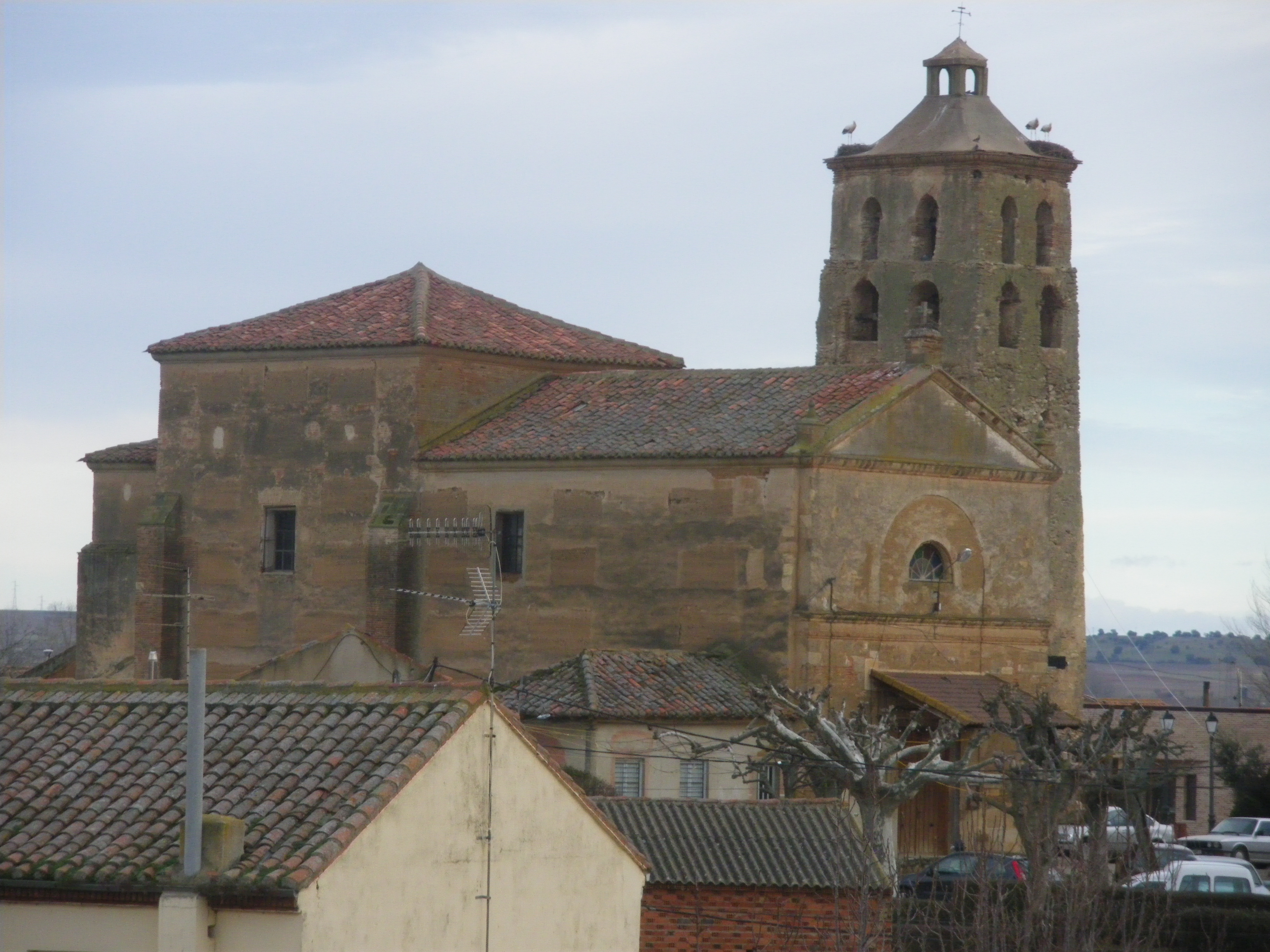
- Church of San Millan de los Caballeros, León
- Interactive map of San Millán de los Caballeros, Spain
- Country: Spain
- Autonomous community: Castile and León
- Province: León
- Municipality: San Millán de los Caballeros

Area
  - Total: 24 km^{2} (9.3 sq mi)

Population (2025-01-01)
  - Total: 191
  - Density: 8.0/km^{2} (21/sq mi)
- Time zone: UTC+1 (CET)
  - Summer (DST): UTC+2 (CEST)

San Millán de los Caballeros (Spanish pronunciation: [sam miˈʎan de los kaβaˈʎeɾos]) is a municipality located in the province of León, Castile and León, Spain. According to the 2004 census (INE), the municipality has a population of 179 inhabitants.
