= Regueras de Arriba =

Coordinates: 42°18′N 5°51′W

Regueras de Arriba, Spain
- municipality
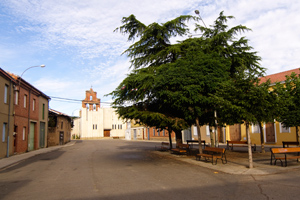

- Flag Coat of arms
- Interactive map of Regueras de Arriba, Spain
- Country: Spain
- Autonomous community: Castile and León
- Province: León
- Municipality: Regueras de Arriba

Area
  - Total: 11 km^{2} (4.2 sq mi)

Population (2025-01-01)
  - Total: 263
  - Density: 24/km^{2} (62/sq mi)
- Time zone: UTC+1 (CET)
  - Summer (DST): UTC+2 (CEST)

Regueras de Arriba is a municipality located in the province of León, Castile and León, Spain. According to the 2004 census (INE), the municipality has a population of 368 inhabitants.

== Villages ==
- Regueras de Arriba
- Regueras de Abajo

== See also ==
- Tierra de La Bañeza
