= Villamartín de Don Sancho =

Coordinates: 42°34′N 5°03′W

Villamartín de Don Sancho, Spain
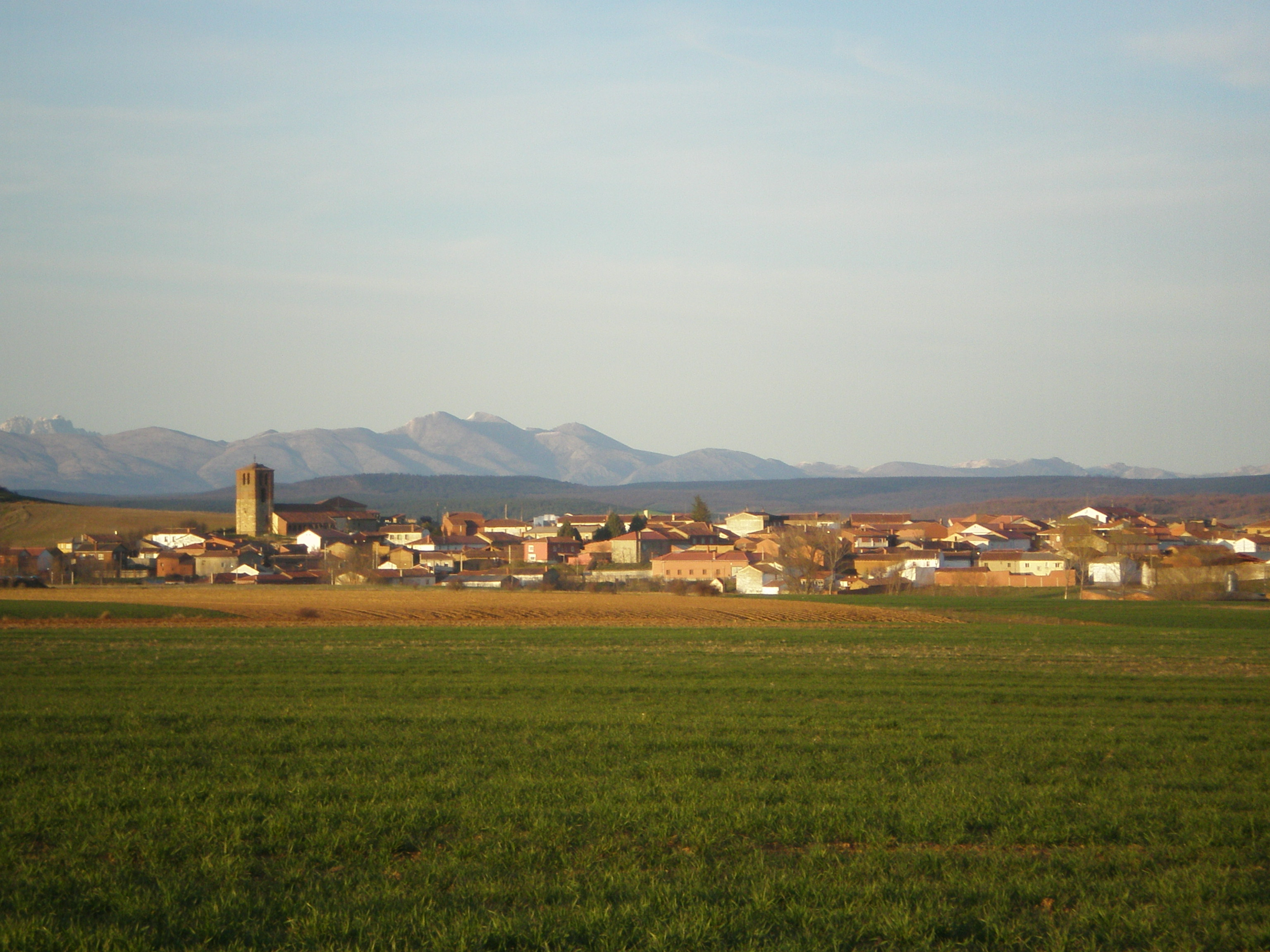

- Coat of arms
- Interactive map of Villamartín de Don Sancho, Spain
- Country: Spain
- Autonomous community: Castile and León
- Province: León
- Municipality: Villamartín de Don Sancho

Area
  - Total: 31.66 km^{2} (12.22 sq mi)
- Elevation: 899 m (2,949 ft)

Population (2025-01-01)
  - Total: 130
  - Density: 4.1/km^{2} (11/sq mi)
- Time zone: UTC+1 (CET)
  - Summer (DST): UTC+2 (CEST)

Villamartín de Don Sancho (Spanish pronunciation: [biʎamaɾˈtin de ðon ˈsantʃo]) is a municipality located in the province of León, Castile and León, Spain. According to the 2004 census (INE), the municipality had a population of 180 inhabitants.
