= Laguna de Negrillos =

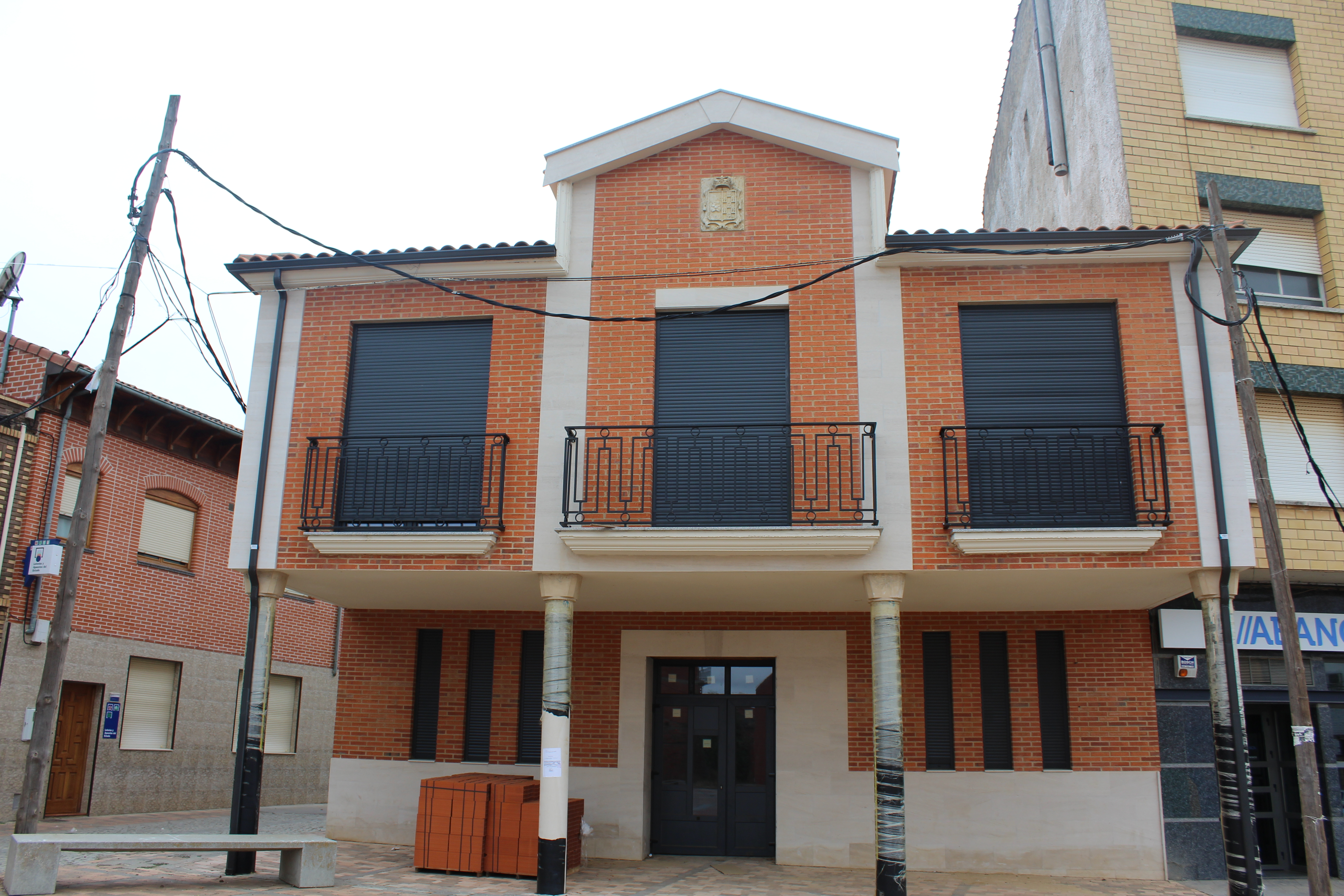
- Town hall

- Flag Coat of arms

- Location within Spain
- Coordinates: 42°14′22″N 5°39′42″W
- Country: Spain
- Autonomous community: Castile and León
- Province: León
- Municipality: Laguna de Negrillos

Government
  - Mayor: Agustín Cabañeros Ramos (PSOE)

Area
  - Total: 71.80 km^{2} (27.72 sq mi)
- Elevation: 774 m (2,539 ft)

Population (2025-01-01)
  - Total: 1,056
  - Density: 14.71/km^{2} (38.09/sq mi)
- Demonym(s): lagunés, lagunesa; paramés, paramesa
- Time zone: UTC+1 (CET)
  - Summer (DST): UTC+2 (CEST)
- Postal Code: 24234
- Telephone prefix: 987
- Website: Ayto. de Laguna de Negrillos

Laguna de Negrillos (Spanish pronunciation: [laˈɣuna ðe neˈɣɾiʎos]) is a municipality located in the province of León, Castile and León, Spain. According to the 2010 census (INE), the municipality has a population of 1,164 inhabitants.
