= Soto de la Vega =

Coordinates: 42°20′N 5°53′W

Soto de la Vega, Spain
- municipality
- Flag Coat of arms
- Interactive map of Soto de la Vega, Spain
- Country: Spain
- Autonomous community: Castile and León
- Province: León
- Municipality: Soto de la Vega

Area
  - Total: 23 km^{2} (8.9 sq mi)

Population (2025-01-01)
  - Total: 1,481
  - Density: 64/km^{2} (170/sq mi)
- Time zone: UTC+1 (CET)
  - Summer (DST): UTC+2 (CEST)

Soto de la Vega is a municipality located in the province of León, Castile and León, Spain. According to the 2007 census (INE), the municipality has a population of 1,888 inhabitants.

== See also ==
- Tierra de La Bañeza
- Leonese language
- Kingdom of León
