= San Pedro Bercianos =

Coordinates: 42°24′N 5°42′W

- municipality
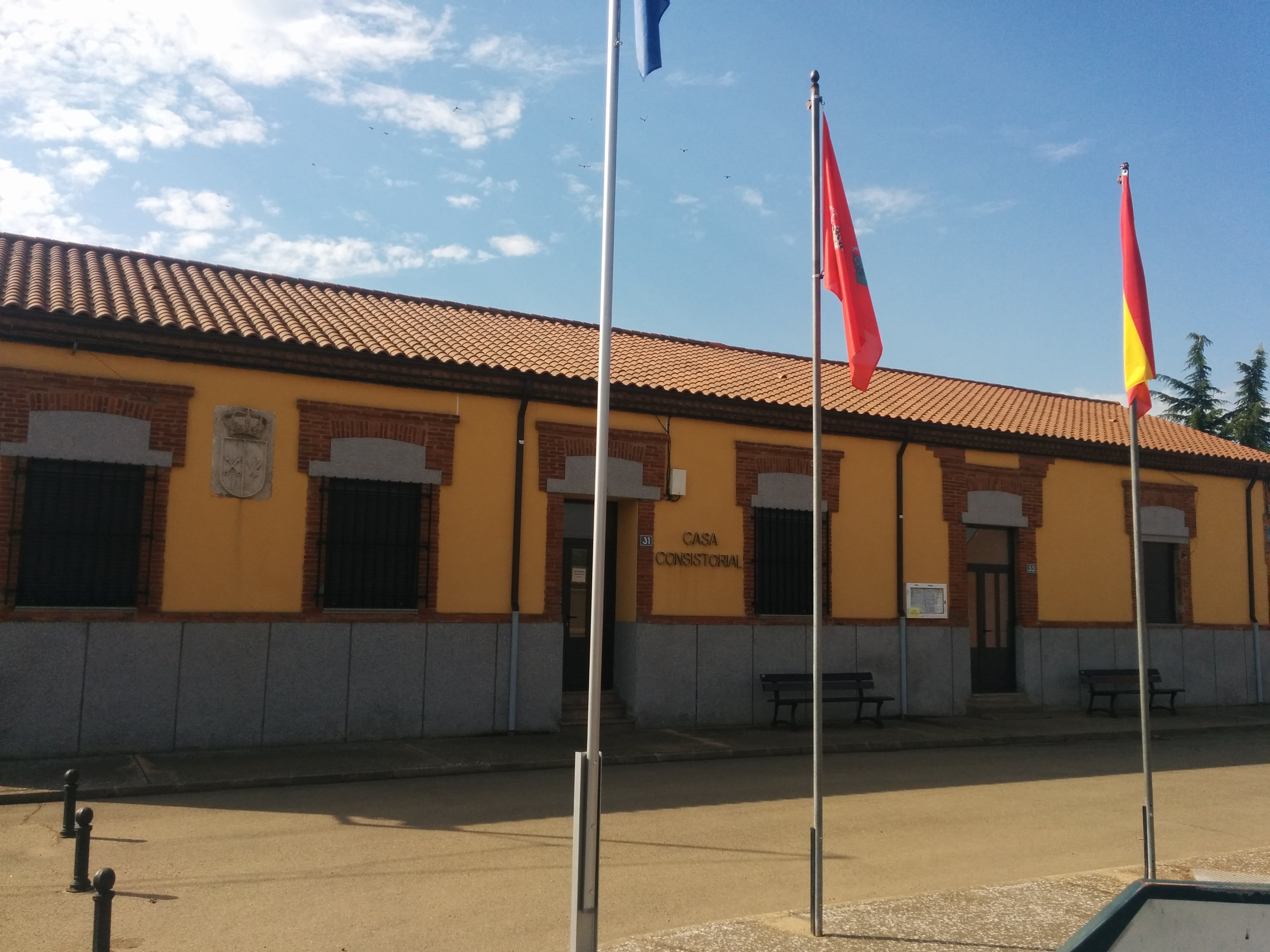
- City Council of San Pedro Bercianos, province of León, Spain.

- Coat of arms
- Interactive map of San Pedro Bercianos
- Country: Spain
- Autonomous community: Castile and León
- Province: León
- Municipality: San Pedro Bercianos

Area
  - Total: 23.51 km^{2} (9.08 sq mi)
- Elevation: 823 m (2,700 ft)

Population (2025-01-01)
  - Total: 218
  - Density: 9.27/km^{2} (24.0/sq mi)
- Time zone: UTC+1 (CET)
  - Summer (DST): UTC+2 (CEST)
- Climate: Csb

San Pedro Bercianos is a municipality located in the province of León, Castile and León, Spain. According to the 2004 census (INE), the municipality has a population of 346 inhabitants.
