= Castrillo de la Valduerna =

- Flag Coat of arms

- Location within Spain
- Coordinates: 42°19′27″N 6°8′5″W
- Country: Spain
- Autonomous community: Castile and León
- Province: León
- Municipality: Castrillo de la Valduerna

Government
  - Mayor: Elvira Flórez López (PP)

Area
  - Total: 23.51 km^{2} (9.08 sq mi)
- Elevation: 904 m (2,966 ft)

Population (2025-01-01)
  - Total: 136
  - Density: 5.78/km^{2} (15.0/sq mi)
- Time zone: UTC+1 (CET)
  - Summer (DST): UTC+2 (CEST)
- Postal Code: 24721
- Telephone prefix: 987
- Website: Ayto. de Castrillo de la Valduerna

Castrillo de la Valduerna (Spanish pronunciation: [kasˈtɾiʎo ðe la βalˈdweɾna]; Leonese: Castriellu la Valduerna), is a municipality located in the province of León, Castile and León, Spain. According to the 2025 census (INE), the municipality has a population of 136 inhabitants.

== See also ==
- Kingdom of León
- Leonese language
