= Quintana y Congosto =

Coordinates: 42°15′N 6°02′W

Quintana y Congosto, Spain
- municipality
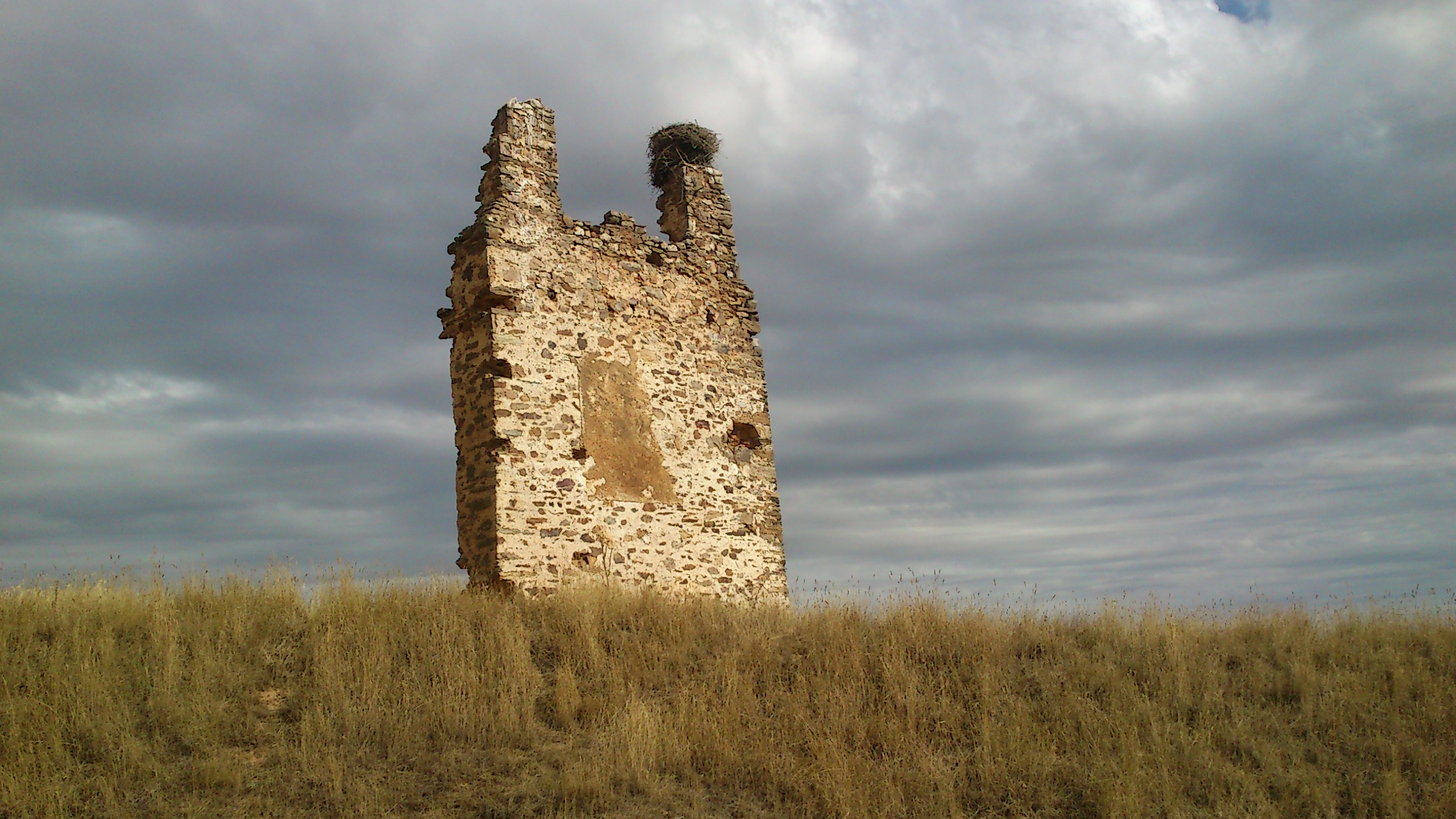
- Interactive map of Quintana y Congosto, Spain
- Country: Spain
- Autonomous community: Castile and León
- Province: León
- Municipality: Quintana y Congosto

Area
  - Total: 88 km^{2} (34 sq mi)

Population (2025-01-01)
  - Total: 402
  - Density: 4.6/km^{2} (12/sq mi)
- Time zone: UTC+1 (CET)
  - Summer (DST): UTC+2 (CEST)

Quintana y Congosto is a municipality located in the province of León, Castile and León, Spain. According to the 2004 census (INE), the municipality has a population of 702 inhabitants.
