= Riego de la Vega =

Coordinates: 42°23′N 5°59′W

Riego de la Vega, Spain
- municipality
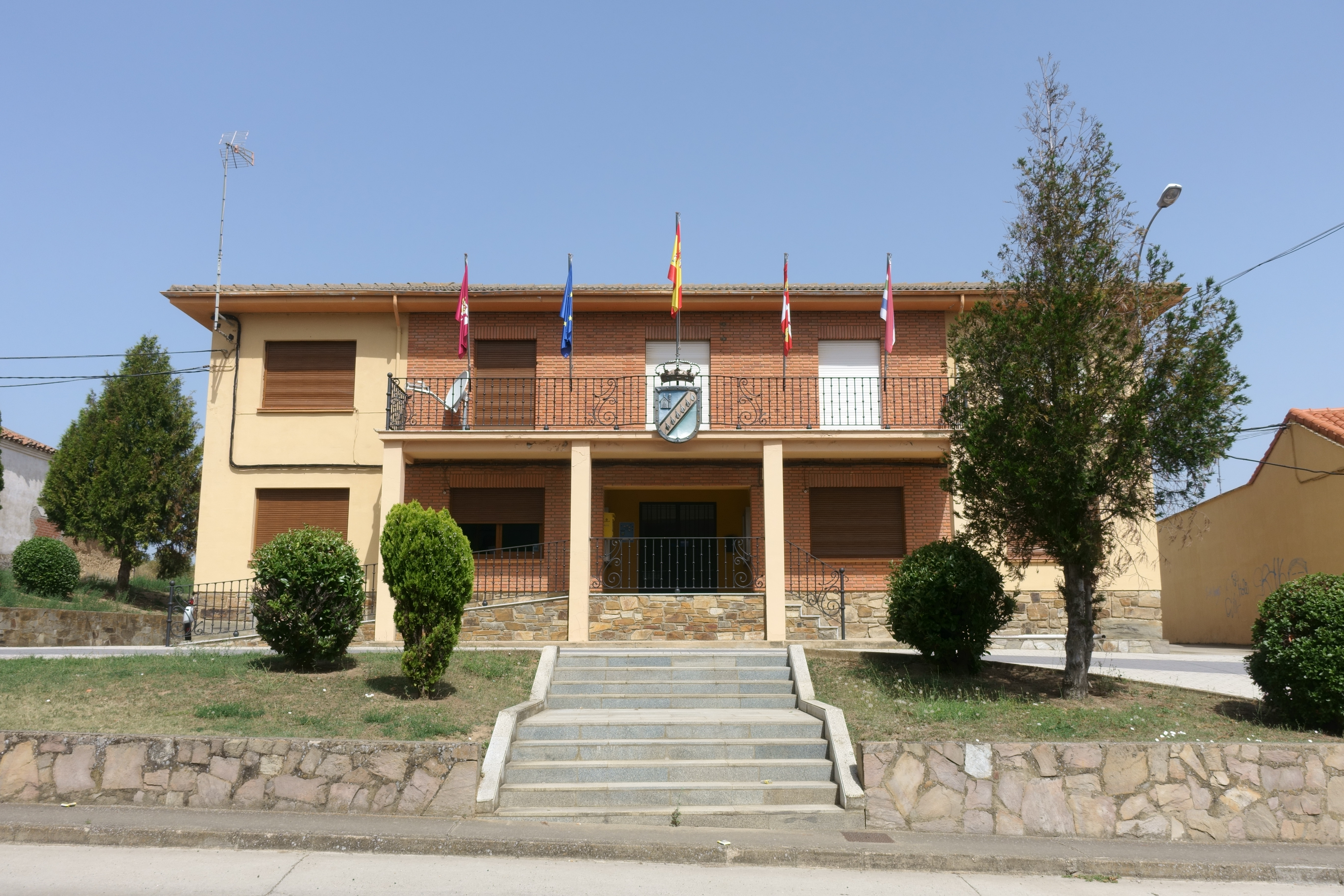
- Riego de la Vega Town Hall

- Flag Coat of arms
- Interactive map of Riego de la Vega, Spain
- Country: Spain
- Autonomous community: Castile and León
- Province: León
- Municipality: Riego de la Vega

Area
  - Total: 35 km^{2} (14 sq mi)

Population (2025-01-01)
  - Total: 697
  - Density: 20/km^{2} (52/sq mi)
- Time zone: UTC+1 (CET)
  - Summer (DST): UTC+2 (CEST)

Riego de la Vega is a municipality located in the province of León, Castile and León, Spain. According to the 2004 census (INE), the municipality has a population of 1,014 inhabitants.
