= Villamontán de la Valduerna =

- municipality
- Flag Coat of arms
- Nickname: Villamontán
- Location within Spain
- Coordinates: 42°18′35″N 5°59′45″W
- Country: Spain
- Autonomous community: Castile and León
- Province: León
- Municipality: Villamontán de la Valduerna

Government
  - Mayor: Jerónimo Alonso García (1982) (PP)

Area
  - Total: 5,715 km^{2} (2,207 sq mi)
- Elevation: 820 m (2,690 ft)

Population (2025-01-01)
  - Total: 678
  - Density: 17.6/km^{2} (46/sq mi)
- Time zone: UTC+1 (CET)
  - Summer (DST): UTC+2 (CEST)
- Postal code: 24766
- Dialing code: 987
- Website: Ayto. de Villamontán de la Valduerna

Villamontán de la Valduerna (Spanish pronunciation: [biʎamonˈtan de la βalˈdweɾna]) is a municipality located in the province of León, Castile and León, Spain. According to the 2008 census (INE), the municipality has a population of 941 inhabitants. In addition to Villamontán, the municipality includes the villages of Fresno de la Valduerna, Miñambres de la Valduerna, Posada de la Valduerna, Redelga de la Valduerna, Valle de la Valduerna and Villalís de la Valduerna.
