= Turcia =

Coordinates: 42°32′N 5°52′W

- municipality
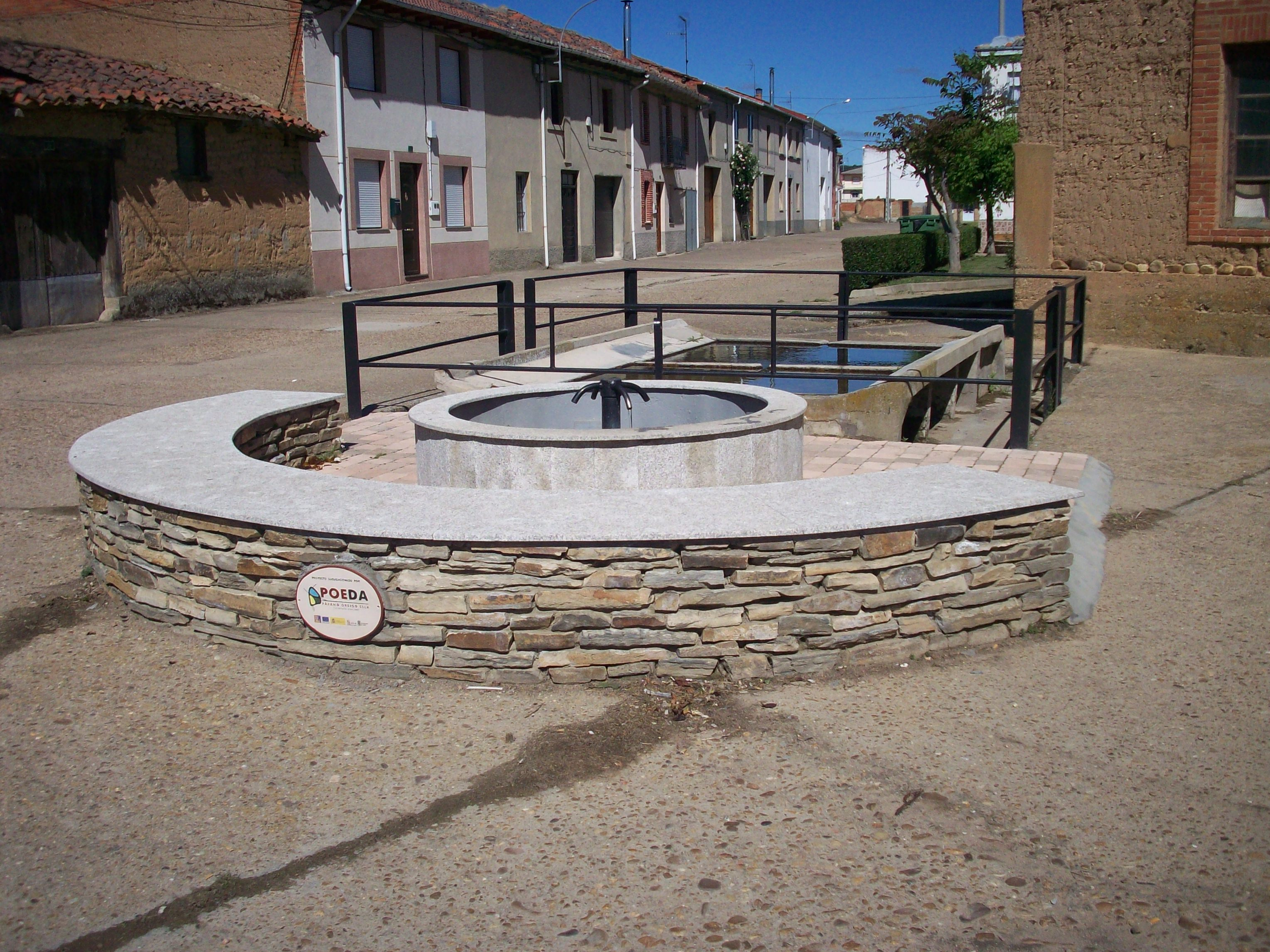
- The 1931 Turcia Artesian Well

- Coat of arms
- Interactive map of Turcia
- Country: Spain
- Autonomous community: Castile and León
- Province: León
- Municipality: Turcia

Area
  - Total: 31 km^{2} (12 sq mi)

Population (2025-01-01)
  - Total: 974
  - Density: 31/km^{2} (81/sq mi)
- Time zone: UTC+1 (CET)
  - Summer (DST): UTC+2 (CEST)

Turcia is a municipality located in the province of León, Castile and León, Spain. According to the 2004 census (INE), the municipality has a population of 1,216 inhabitants.
