= Province of León =

Province of Spain

Province of León Provincia de León (Spanish) Provincia de Llión (Leonese)
- Province
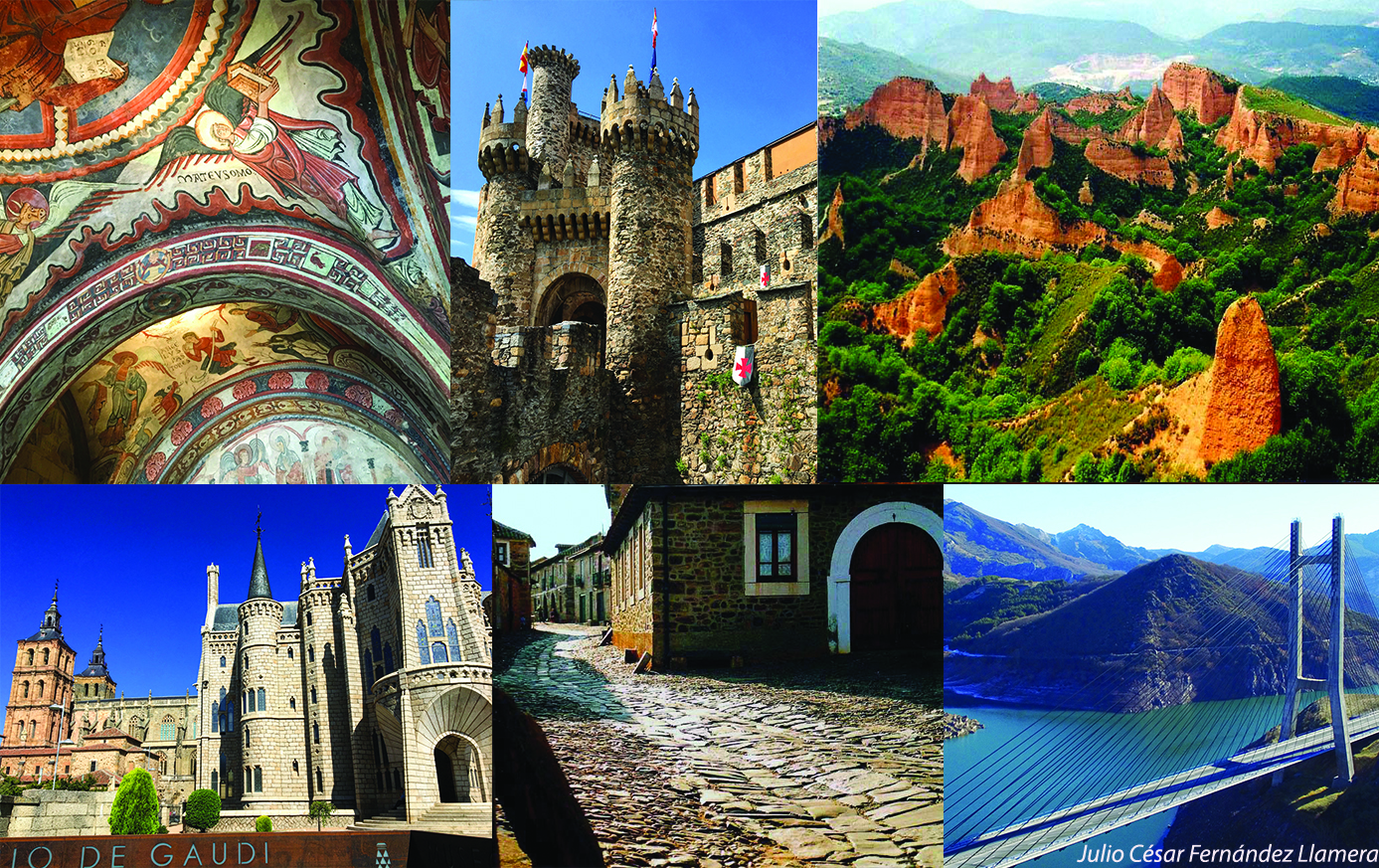
- Main sights from the province of León. From left to right: Pantheon of San Isidoro, Ponferrada castle, Las Médulas, Astorga, Castrillo de los Polvazares, Barrios de Luna Reservoir.

- Flag Coat of arms

- Location of the Province of León in Spain
- Coordinates: 42°40′N 6°00′W
- Country: Spain
- Autonomous community: Castile and León
- Capital: León
- Municipalities: 211

Area
  - Total: 15,578.32 km^{2} (6,014.82 sq mi)
  - Rank: 7th in Spain
- 3.1% of Spain

Population (2025)
  - Total: 448,030
  - Rank: 33th in Spain
  - Density: 28.760/km^{2} (74.488/sq mi)
- 0.9% of Spain
- Demonym(s): Leonese; Spanish: Leonés/Leonesa
- Time zone: UTC+1 (CET)
  - Summer (DST): UTC+2 (CEST)
- ISO 3166 code: ES-LE
- Website: dipuleon.es

The Province of León (UK: /leɪˈɒn/, US: /leɪˈoʊn/; Spanish: Provincia de León [leˈon]; Leonese: Provincia de Llión [ʎiˈoŋ]; Leonese: [leˈoŋ]) is a province of northwestern Spain, in the northern part of the Region of León, and in the northwestern part of the autonomous community of Castile and León.

It has a population of 448,030 in an area of 15,578.32 square kilometres (6,014.82 sq mi) across its 211 municipalities.

The climate is dry, cold in winter and hot in summer. This creates the perfect environment for wine and all types of cold meats and sausages like the leonese "Morcilla" and the "Cecina".

There are two famous Roman Catholic cathedrals in the province, the main one in León and another in Astorga. The province shares the Picos de Europa National Park (in the Picos de Europa mountain range) with Cantabria and Asturias. It has 211 municipalities.

== History ==
The province of León was established in 1833 with the new Spanish administrative organisation of regions and provinces to replace former kingdoms. The greater Leonese Region was composed of the provinces of León, Salamanca, Valladolid, Palencia and Zamora.

The Kingdom of León was founded in 910 A.D. when the Christian princes of Asturias along the northern coast of the Iberian peninsula shifted their main seat from Oviedo to the city of León. The eastern, inland part of the kingdom was joined dynastically to the Kingdom of Castile, first in 1037–1065, then in 1077–1109 and again in 1126–1157, 1230–1296 and from 1301 onward (see: historic union of the Kingdoms of Castile and León). The western and Atlantic provinces became the Kingdom of Portugal in 1139.

The independently administered Kingdom of León, situated in the northwestern region of the Iberian Peninsula, retained the status of a kingdom until 1833, although dynastic union had brought it into the Crown of Castile. The Kingdom was composed of Adelantamientos Mayores, where the Leonese Adelantamientos consisted of the territories between the Picos de Europa and the Duero River. The political and military chiefs of these territories were referred to as Adelantados; those chiefs began to convene as an assembly in the early 12th century, while the crown appointed the Merinos as minor and appellate judges.

According to UNESCO, in 1188 the Kingdom of León developed the first Parliament in Europe, the Cortes de León, which included the elected representatives of towns and cities. In 1202, that Parliament approved economic legislation to regulate trade and guilds.

== Climate ==
As for the temperatures, in general it is a cold climate due to the altitude and the abundance of frost (which persist from November to May), being more intense in the mountainous areas reaching -18 °C. Vega de Liordes, an enclave in the León sector of Picos de Europa belonging to the municipality of Posada de Valdeón registered −35.8 °C (−32.4 °F) on January 7, 2021.

== Municipalities ==
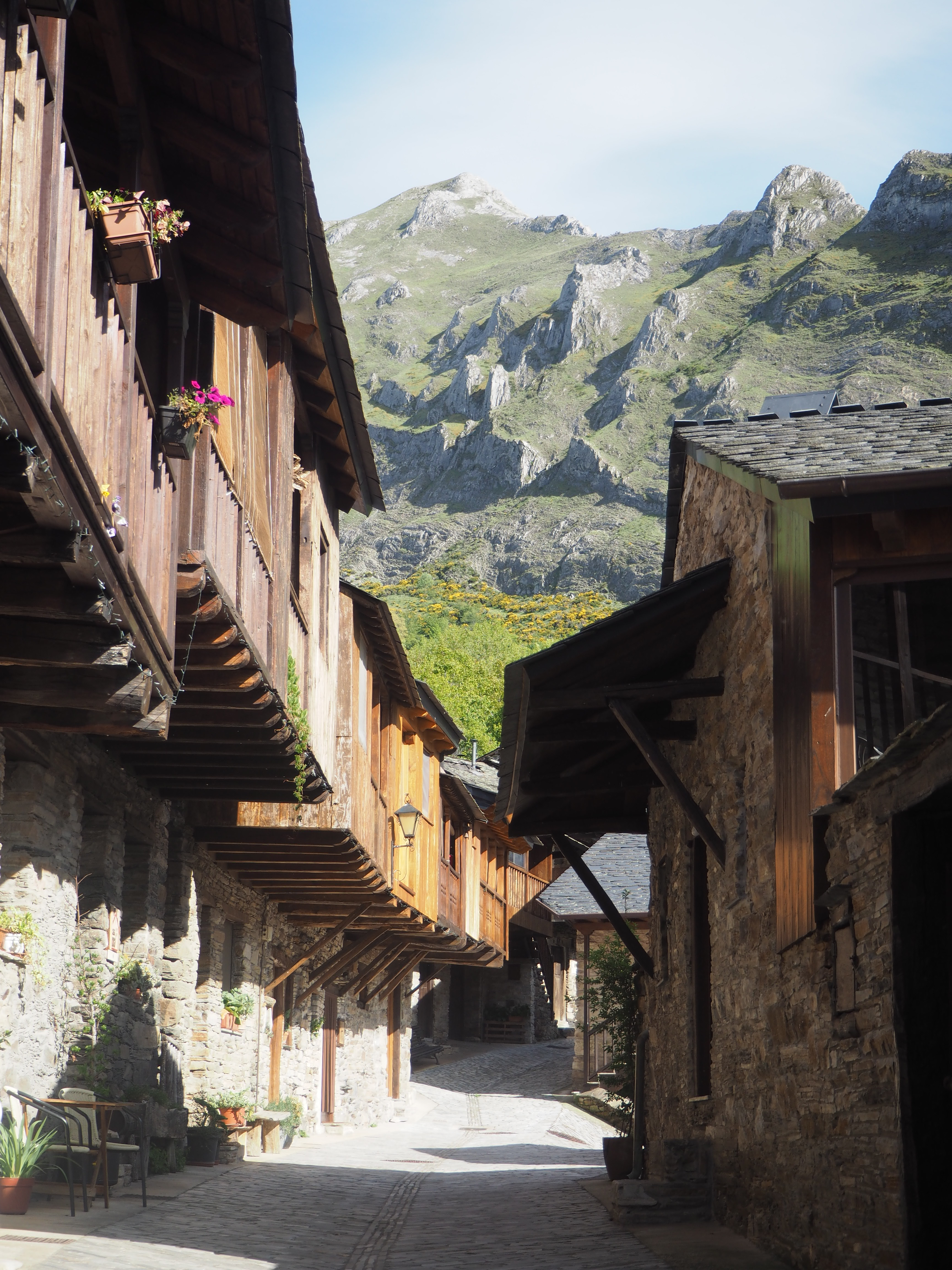
Peñalba de Santiago, a medieval village in El Bierzo.

The province has 211 municipalities:

- Acebedo
- Algadefe
- Alija del Infantado
- Almanza
- La Antigua
- Ardón
- Arganza
- Astorga
- Balboa
- La Bañeza
- Barjas
- Los Barrios de Luna
- Bembibre
- Benavides
- Benuza
- Bercianos del Páramo
- Bercianos del Real Camino
- Berlanga del Bierzo
- Boca de Huérgano
- Boñar
- Borrenes
- Brazuelo
- El Burgo Ranero
- Burón
- Bustillo del Páramo
- Cabañas Raras
- Cabreros del Río
- Cabrillanes
- Cacabelos
- Calzada del Coto
- Campazas
- Campo de Villavidel
- Camponaraya
- Cármenes
- Carracedelo
- Carrizo
- Carrocera
- Carucedo
- Castilfalé
- Castrillo de Cabrera
- Castrillo de la Valduerna
- Castrocalbón
- Castrocontrigo
- Castropodame
- Castrotierra de Valmadrigal
- Cea
- Cebanico
- Cebrones del Río
- Chozas de Abajo
- Cimanes de la Vega
- Cimanes del Tejar
- Cistierna
- Congosto
- Corbillos de los Oteros
- Corullón
- Crémenes
- Cuadros
- Cubillas de los Oteros
- Cubillas de Rueda
- Cubillos del Sil
- Destriana
- Encinedo
- La Ercina
- Escobar de Campos
- Fabero
- Folgoso de la Ribera
- Fresno de la Vega
- Fuentes de Carbajal
- Garrafe de Torío
- Gordaliza del Pino
- Gordoncillo
- Gradefes
- Grajal de Campos
- Gusendos de los Oteros
- Hospital de Órbigo
- Igüeña
- Izagre
- Joarilla de las Matas
- Laguna Dalga
- Laguna de Negrillos
- León
- Llamas de la Ribera
- Lucillo
- Luyego
- Magaz de Cepeda
- Mansilla de las Mulas
- Mansilla Mayor
- Maraña
- Matadeón de los Oteros
- Matallana de Torío
- Matanza de los Oteros
- Molinaseca
- Murias de Paredes
- Noceda del Bierzo
- Oencia
- Las Omañas
- Onzonilla
- Oseja de Sajambre
- Pajares de los Oteros
- Palacios de la Valduerna
- Palacios del Sil
- Páramo del Sil
- Peranzanes
- Pobladura de Pelayo García
- La Pola de Gordón
- Ponferrada
- Posada de Valdeón
- Pozuelo del Páramo
- Prado de la Guzpeña
- Priaranza del Bierzo
- Prioro
- Puebla de Lillo
- Puente de Domingo Flórez
- Quintana del Castillo
- Quintana del Marco
- Quintana y Congosto
- Regueras de Arriba
- Reyero
- Riaño
- Riego de la Vega
- Riello
- Rioseco de Tapia
- La Robla
- Roperuelos del Páramo
- Sabero
- Sahagún
- San Adrián del Valle
- San Andrés del Rabanedo
- Sancedo
- San Cristóbal de la Polantera
- San Emiliano
- San Esteban de Nogales
- San Justo de la Vega
- San Millán de los Caballeros
- San Pedro Bercianos
- Santa Colomba de Curueño
- Santa Colomba de Somoza
- Santa Cristina de Valmadrigal
- Santa Elena de Jamuz
- Santa María de la Isla
- Santa María del Monte de Cea
- Santa María de Ordás
- Santa María del Páramo
- Santa Marina del Rey
- Santas Martas
- Santiago Millas
- Santovenia de la Valdoncina
- Sariegos
- Sena de Luna
- Sobrado
- Soto de la Vega
- Soto y Amío
- Toral de los Guzmanes
- Toral de los Vados
- Toreno
- Torre del Bierzo
- Trabadelo
- Truchas
- Turcia
- Urdiales del Páramo
- Valdefresno
- Valdefuentes del Páramo
- Valdelugueros
- Valdemora
- Valdepiélago
- Valdepolo
- Valderas
- Valderrey
- Valderrueda
- Valdesamario
- Val de San Lorenzo
- Valdevimbre
- Valencia de Don Juan
- Valverde de la Virgen
- Valverde-Enrique
- Vallecillo
- Valle de Ancares
- La Vecilla
- Vegacervera
- Vega de Espinareda
- Vega de Infanzones
- Vega de Valcarce
- Vegaquemada
- Vegas del Condado
- Villablino
- Villabraz
- Villadangos del Páramo
- Villademor de la Vega
- Villafranca del Bierzo
- Villagatón
- Villamandos
- Villamanín
- Villamañán
- Villamartín de Don Sancho
- Villamejil
- Villamol
- Villamontán de la Valduerna
- Villamoratiel de las Matas
- Villanueva de las Manzanas
- Villaobispo de Otero
- Villaornate y Castro
- Villaquejida
- Villaquilambre
- Villarejo de Órbigo
- Villares de Órbigo
- Villasabariego
- Villaselán
- Villaturiel
- Villazala
- Villazanzo de Valderaduey
- Zotes del Páramo

== Comarcas ==
The province has 8 comarcas/counties:

- El Bierzo
- Maragatería
- Tierra de Sahagún
- La Montaña
- La Ribera
- La Cabrera
- Tierras de La Bañeza
- Tierras de León

== Demographics ==
Historical population
Year	Pop.	±%
1842	223,310	—
1857	348,756	+56.2%
1877	357,944	+2.6%
1887	389,233	+8.7%
1900	401,172	+3.1%
1910	419,226	+4.5%
1920	436,369	+4.1%
1930	461,560	+5.8%
1940	508,613	+10.2%
1950	551,072	+8.3%
1960	591,130	+7.3%
1970	562,766	−4.8%
1981	523,607	−7.0%
1991	525,896	+0.4%
2001	488,751	−7.1%
2011	493,312	+0.9%
2021	452,435	−8.3%
Source: INE

As of 2025, the population is 448,030, of which 48.7% are male, and 51.3% are female. Minors make up 12.3% of the population, and seniors make up 29.4%.

=== Languages ===
The Provincial Government of León signed accords with language associations for promoting the Leonese language. Leonese is taught in the city of León, Mansilla de las Mulas, La Bañeza, Valencia de Don Juan or Ponferrada for adult people, and in sixteen schools of León. The City Council of León writes some of its announcements in Leonese in order to promote the language.

In the western part of the El Bierzo, the westernmost region of the province, Galician language is spoken and taught at schools.

=== Immigration ===
As of 2025, immigrants make up 10.1% of the population. The 5 largest foreign countries of birth are Colombia, Morocco, Venezuela, the Dominican Republic, and Portugal.

== Cuisine ==
Embutidos

- Cecina de León: from beef. In the Leonese language, cecina means "meat that has been salted and dried by means of air, sun or smoke". Cecina de León is made of the hind legs of beef, salted, smoked and air-dried in the province of León, and has PGI status.
- Botillo: from pig. Traditionally made in the western Leonese regions, botiellu in Leonese or botelo in Galician, is a dish of meat-stuffed pork intestine. It is a culinary specialty of the county of El Bierzo and also of the region of Trás-os-Montes in Portugal. This type of embutido is a meat product made from different pieces left over from the butchering of a pig, including the ribs, tail, and bones with a little meat left on them. These are chopped; seasoned with salt, pepper, garlic, and other spices; stuffed in the cecum of the pig; and partly cured via smoking. It can also include the pig's tongue, shoulder blade, jaw, and backbone, but never exceeding 20% of the total volume. It is normally consumed cooked, covered with a sheet. In some parts of the province, especially close to the Orbigo river, it is also known as yosco. It has PGI status.

Cheese

- Queso de Valdeón (Valdeón cheese): a blue cheese produced in Posada de Valdeon, traditionally wrapped in chestnut or sycamore maple leaves before being sent to market.

Wines

- Bierzo: in the west of the province of León and covers about 3,000 km^{2}. The area consists of numerous small valleys in the mountainous part (Alto Bierzo) and of a wide, flat plain (Bajo Bierzo). The denominación de origen covers 23 municipalities.
- Tierra de León: in the southeast of the province of León.

Sweets

- Mantecadas de Astorga
- Hojaldres de Astorga
- Lazos de San Guillermo
- Nicanores de Boñar

== See also ==
- Matar judíos (lit. 'killing Jews')
- Santiago de Peñalba
- Castrillo de los Polvazares
- Cave of Valporquero
- Kingdom of León
- Leonese language
- List of municipalities in León
- Montes de León
- Asturica Augusta
