= Quintana del Marco =

Coordinates: 42°12′N 5°51′W

Quintana del Marco, Spain
- municipality
- Flag Coat of arms
- Interactive map of Quintana del Marco, Spain
- Country: Spain
- Autonomous community: Castile and León
- Province: León
- Municipality: Quintana del Marco

Area
  - Total: 23 km^{2} (8.9 sq mi)

Population (2025-01-01)
  - Total: 299
  - Density: 13/km^{2} (34/sq mi)
- Time zone: UTC+1 (CET)
  - Summer (DST): UTC+2 (CEST)

Quintana del Marco is a municipality located in the province of León, Castile and León, Spain. According to the 2004 census (INE), the municipality has a population of 516 inhabitants.

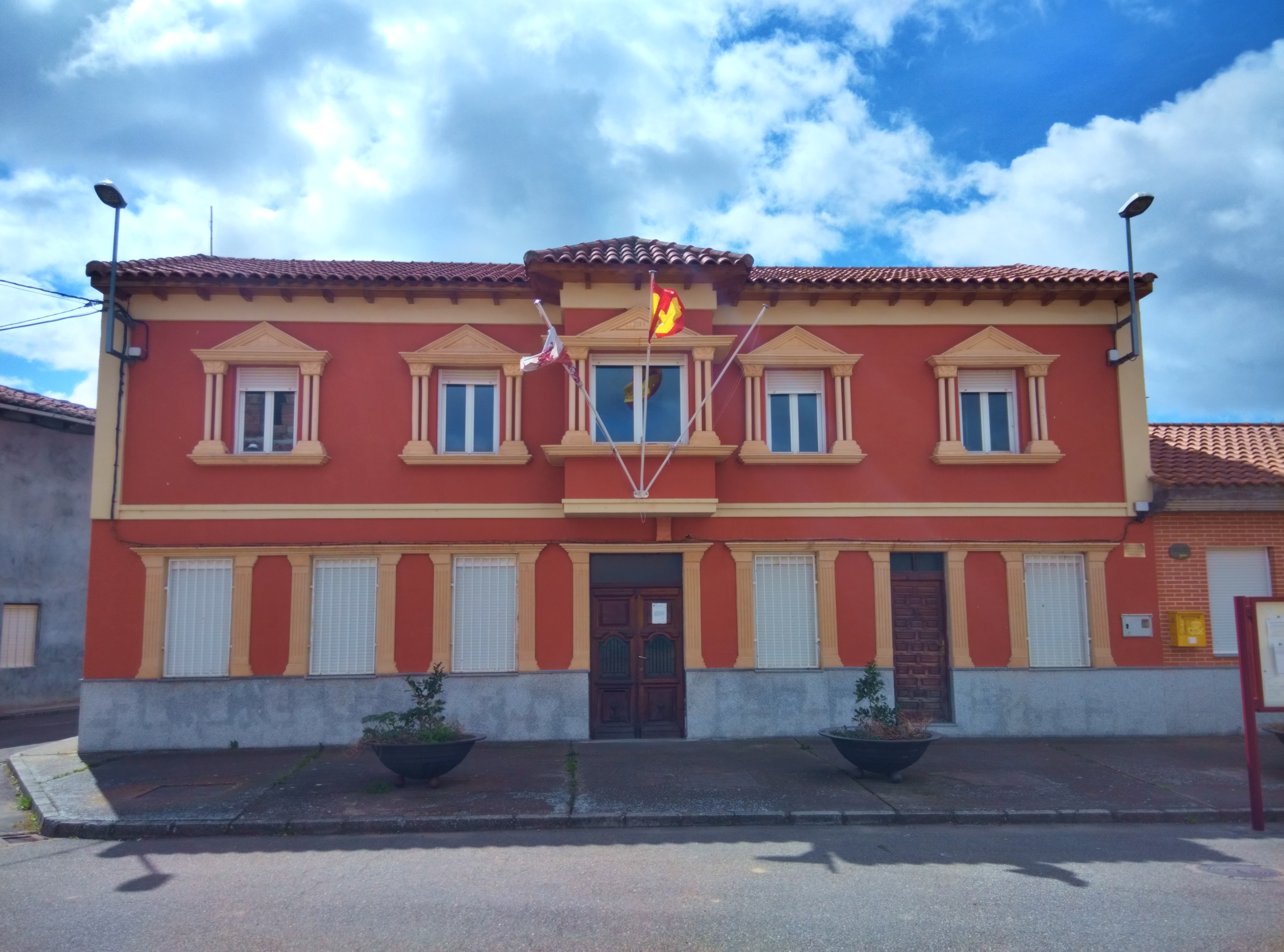
The local area council of Quintana del Marco
