= Villarejo de Órbigo =

Coordinates: 42°27′N 5°54′W

Villarejo de Órbigo, Spain
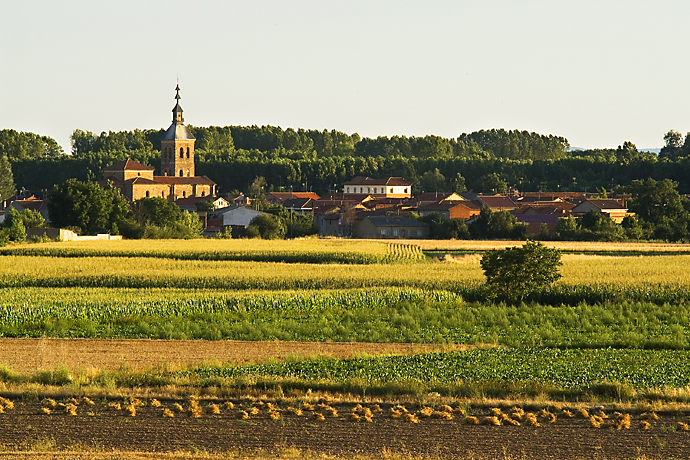
- Villarejo de Órbigo in 2006

- Flag Coat of arms
- Interactive map of Villarejo de Órbigo, Spain
- Country: Spain
- Autonomous community: Castile and León
- Province: León
- Municipality: Villarejo de Órbigo

Area
  - Total: 36.25 km^{2} (14.00 sq mi)
- Elevation: 814 m (2,671 ft)

Population (2025-01-01)
  - Total: 2,856
  - Density: 78.79/km^{2} (204.1/sq mi)
- Time zone: UTC+1 (CET)
  - Summer (DST): UTC+2 (CEST)

Villarejo de Órbigo is a municipality located in the province of León, Castile and León, Spain. According to the 2004 census (INE), the municipality had a population of 2,390 inhabitants.
