= Palacios de la Valduerna =

Coordinates: 42°20′N 5°56′W

- municipality
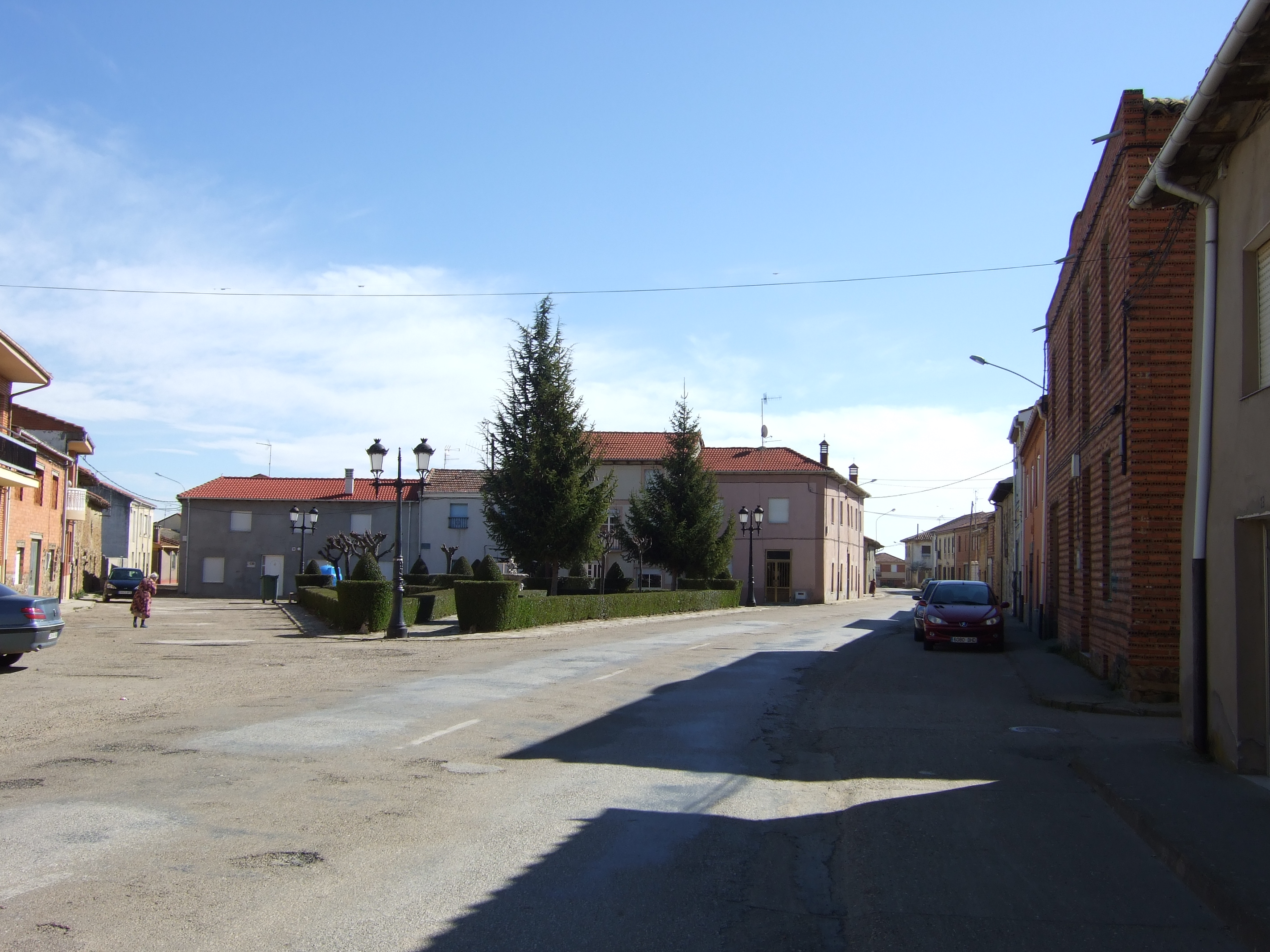
- The big square of Palacios de la Valduerna municipal

- Flag Coat of arms
- Interactive map of Palacios de la Valduerna
- Country: Spain
- Autonomous community: Castile and León
- Province: León
- Municipality: Palacios de la Valduerna

Area
  - Total: 20 km^{2} (7.7 sq mi)

Population (2025-01-01)
  - Total: 341
  - Density: 17/km^{2} (44/sq mi)
- Time zone: UTC+1 (CET)
  - Summer (DST): UTC+2 (CEST)
- Climate: Csb

Palacios de la Valduerna is a municipality located in the province of León, Castile and León, Spain. According to the 2004 census (INE), the municipality has a population of 497 inhabitants.
