= Santa María de la Isla =

Coordinates: 42°21′N 5°56′W

Santa María de la Isla, Spain
- Flag Coat of arms
- Interactive map of Santa María de la Isla, Spain
- Country: Spain
- Autonomous community: Castile and León
- Province: León
- Municipality: Santa María de la Isla

Area
  - Total: 12.75 km^{2} (4.92 sq mi)
- Elevation: 788 m (2,585 ft)

Population (2025-01-01)
  - Total: 429
  - Density: 33.6/km^{2} (87.1/sq mi)
- Time zone: UTC+1 (CET)
  - Summer (DST): UTC+2 (CEST)
- Website: http://www.santamariadelaisla.com

Santa María de la Isla is a municipality located in the province of León, Castile and León, Spain. According to the 2004 census (INE), the municipality had a population of 639 inhabitants.

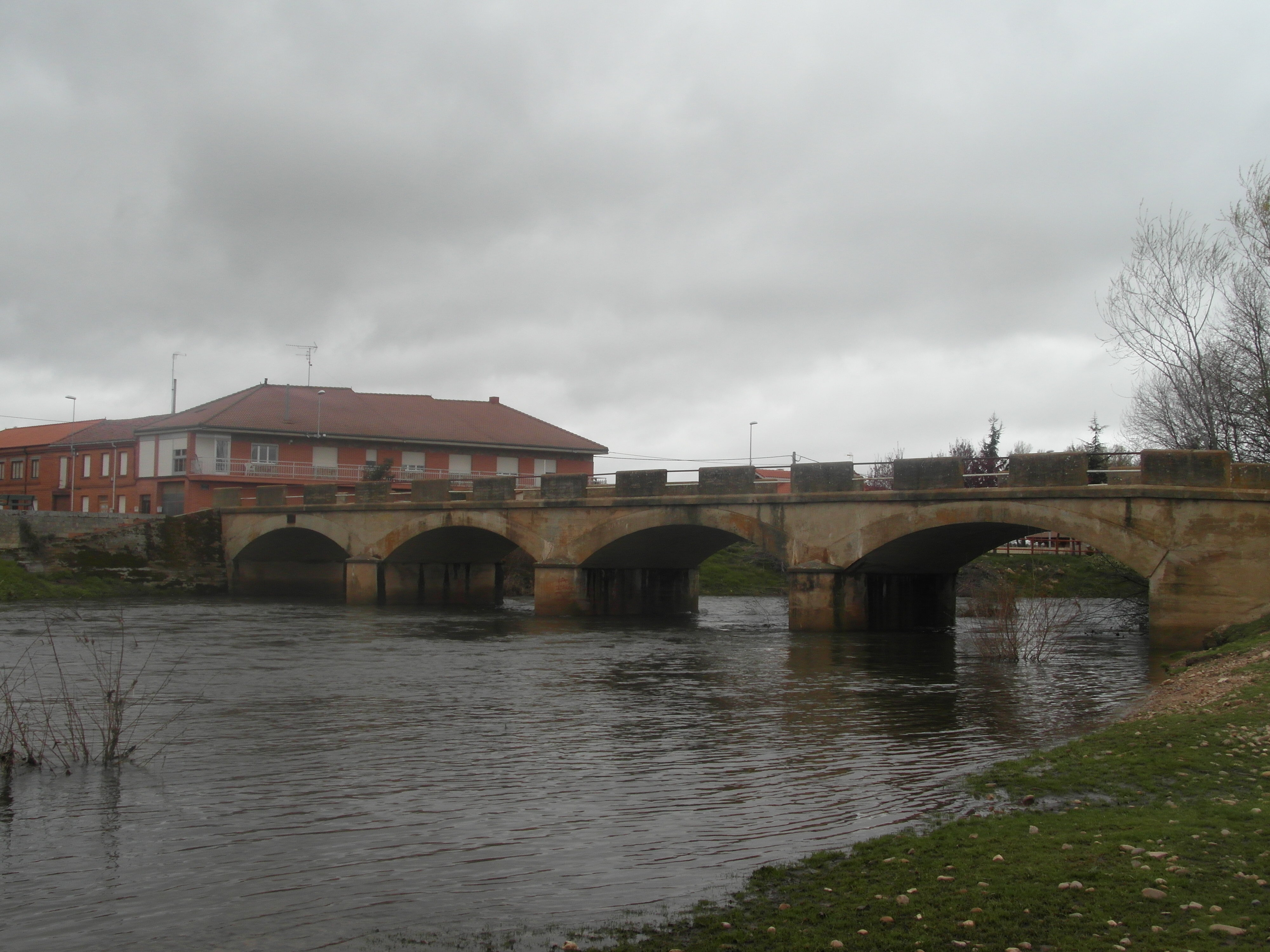
Bridge over the Tuerto river in Santa Maria de la Isla
