= Destriana =

- municipality
- Flag Coat of arms

- Location within Spain
- Coordinates: 42°19′38″N 6°05′45″W
- Country: Spain
- Autonomous community: Castile and León
- Province: León
- Municipality: Destriana

Government
  - Mayor: Toribio del Río Berciano (PP)

Area
  - Total: 56.22 km^{2} (21.71 sq mi)
- Elevation: 878 m (2,881 ft)

Population (2025-01-01)
  - Total: 422
  - Density: 7.51/km^{2} (19.4/sq mi)
- Demonym(s): valdornés, valdornesa
- Time zone: UTC+1 (CET)
  - Summer (DST): UTC+2 (CEST)
- Postal Code: 24730
- Telephone prefix: 987
- Website: Ayto. de Destriana

Destriana (Spanish pronunciation: [desˈtɾjana]) is a municipality located in the province of León, Castile and León, Spain. According to the 2010 census (INE), the municipality has a population of 615 inhabitants.
