= Villares de Órbigo =

Coordinates: 42°28′N 5°54′W

Villares de Órbigo, Spain
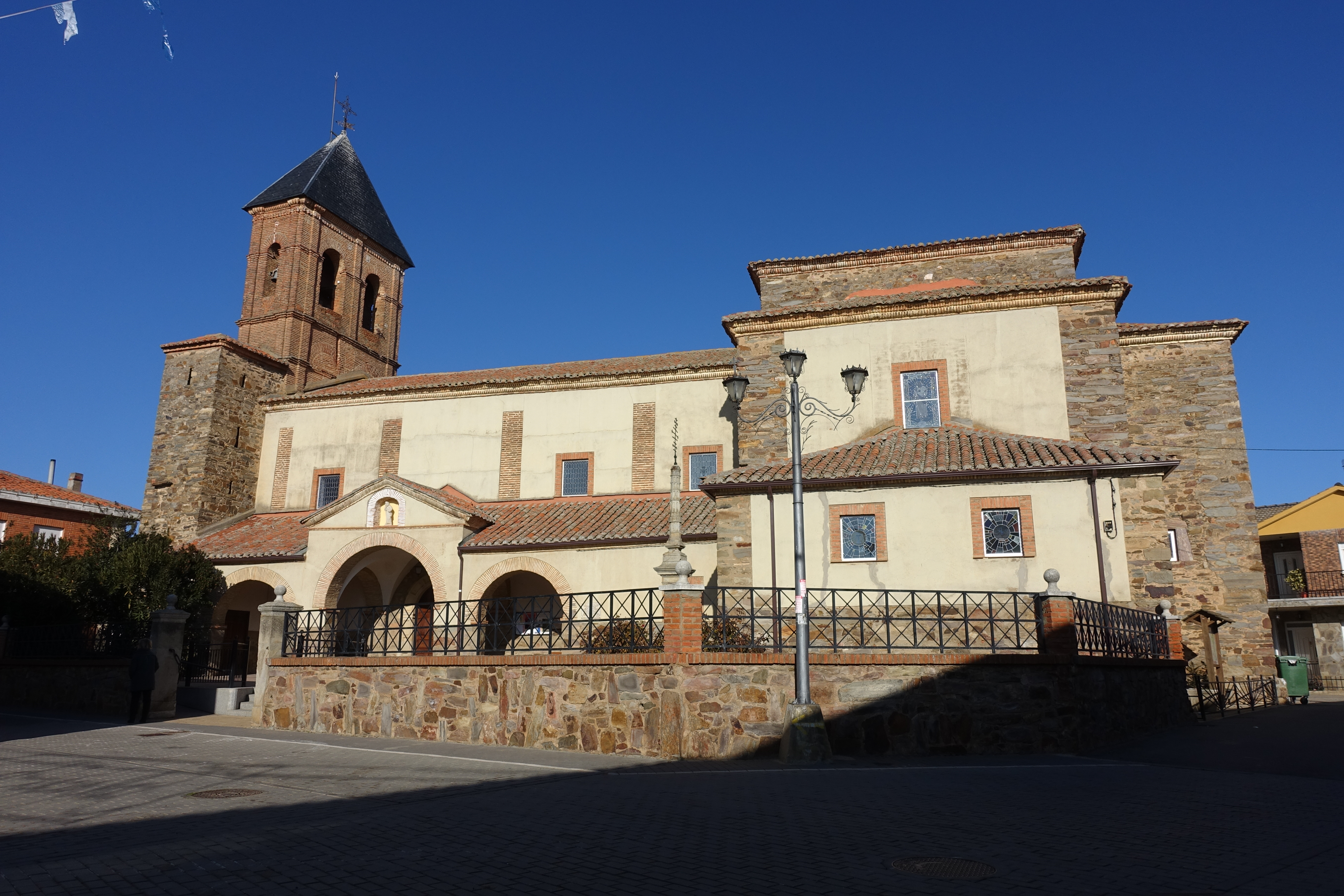
- Church of Santiago Apóstol in Villares de Órbigo, León, Spain

- Coat of arms
- Interactive map of Villares de Órbigo, Spain
- Country: Spain
- Autonomous community: Castile and León
- Province: León
- Municipality: Villares de Órbigo

Area
  - Total: 25.85 km^{2} (9.98 sq mi)
- Elevation: 827 m (2,713 ft)

Population (2025-01-01)
  - Total: 557
  - Density: 21.5/km^{2} (55.8/sq mi)
- Time zone: UTC+1 (CET)
  - Summer (DST): UTC+2 (CEST)

Villares de Órbigo is a municipality located in the province of León, Castile and León, Spain. According to the 2004 census (INE), the municipality had a population of 858 inhabitants.
