= Santa Marina del Rey =

Coordinates: 42°31′N 5°51′W

Santa Marina del Rey, Spain
- municipality
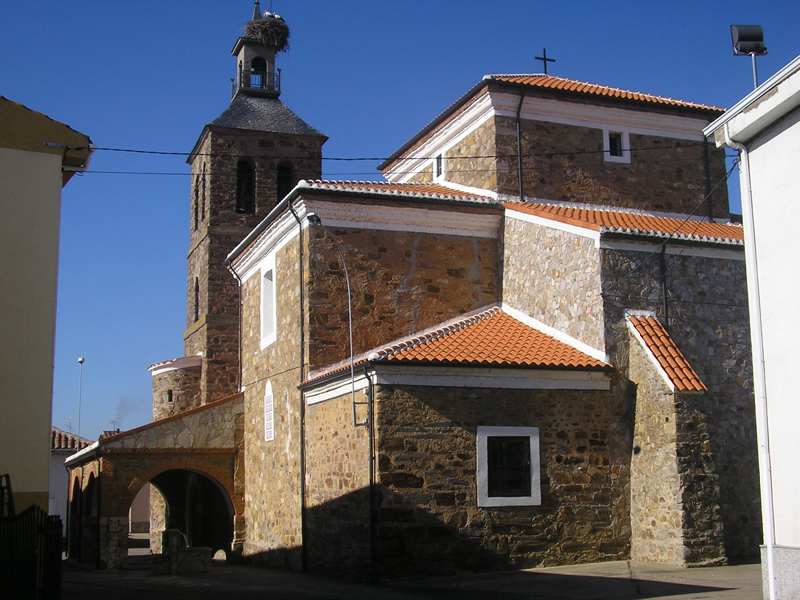
- Villamor de Órbigo's Church in Santa Marina del Rey

- Coat of arms
- Interactive map of Santa Marina del Rey, Spain
- Country: Spain
- Autonomous community: Castile and León
- Province: León
- Municipality: Santa Marina del Rey

Area
  - Total: 45 km^{2} (17 sq mi)

Population (2025-01-01)
  - Total: 1,718
  - Density: 38/km^{2} (99/sq mi)
- Time zone: UTC+1 (CET)
  - Summer (DST): UTC+2 (CEST)

Santa Marina del Rey is a municipality located in the province of León, Castile and León, Spain. According to the 2004 census (INE), the municipality has a population of 2,350 inhabitants.
