= Cebrones del Río =

Cebrones del Río, Spain Cebrones del Ríu
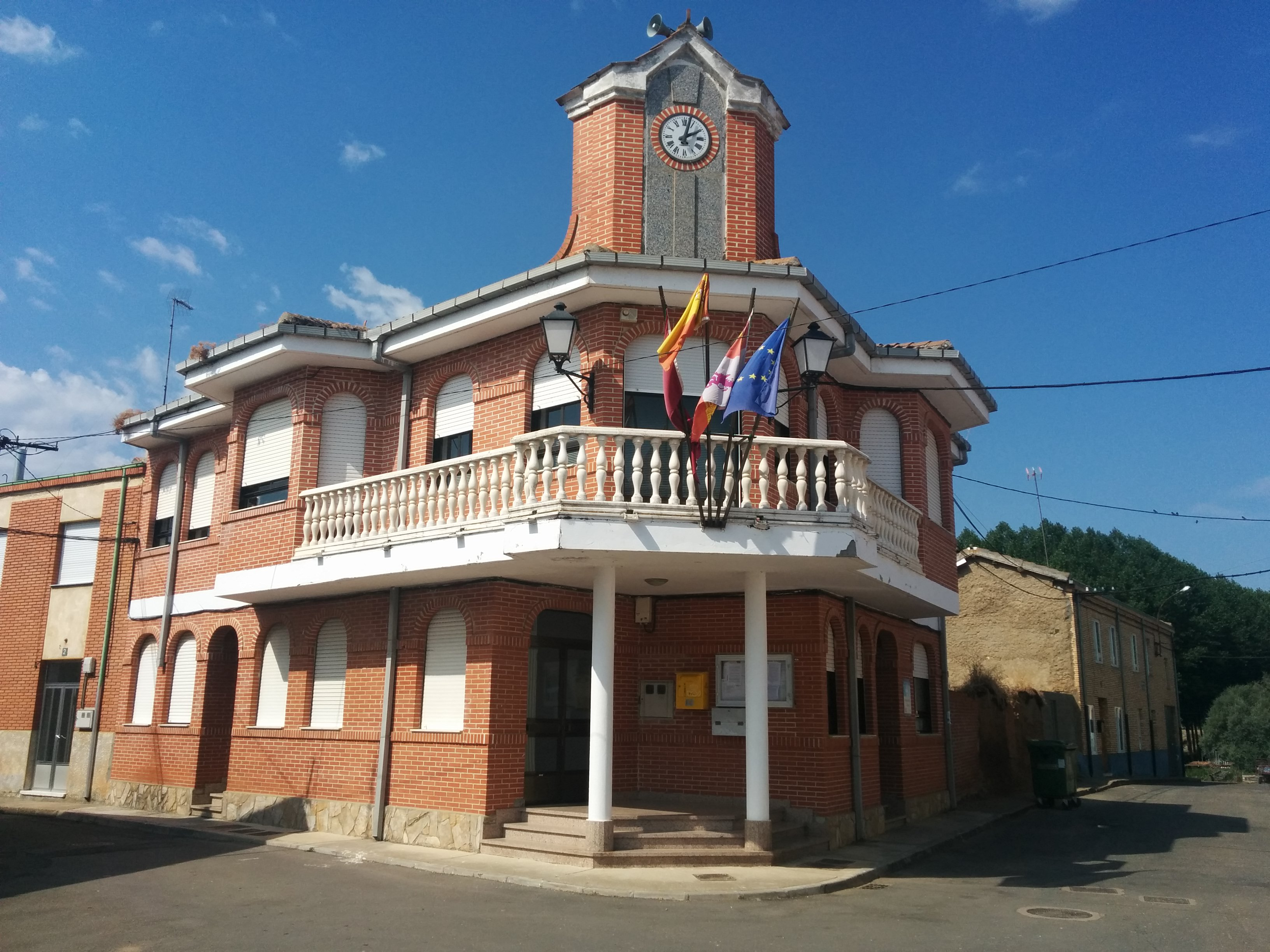
- Town hall

- Coat of arms

- Location within Spain
- Coordinates: 42°16′3″N 5°50′51″W
- Country: Spain
- Autonomous community: Castile and León
- Province: León
- Municipality: Cebrones del Río

Government
  - Mayor: Pedro Gallego Prieto (PP)

Area
  - Total: 21.21 km^{2} (8.19 sq mi)
- Elevation: 758 m (2,487 ft)

Population (2025-01-01)
  - Total: 439
  - Density: 20.7/km^{2} (53.6/sq mi)
- Demonym: bedunense
- Time zone: UTC+1 (CET)
  - Summer (DST): UTC+2 (CEST)
- Postal Code: 24769
- Telephone prefix: 987

Cebrones del Río (Spanish pronunciation: [θeˈβɾones ðel ˈri.o]), Cebrones del Ríu in Leonese language, is a municipality located in the province of León, Castile and León, Spain. According to the 2010 census (INE), the municipality had a population of 560 inhabitants.

== See also ==
- Kingdom of León
- Leonese language
- Llión
