= Llamas de la Ribera =

Llamas de la Ribera, Spain
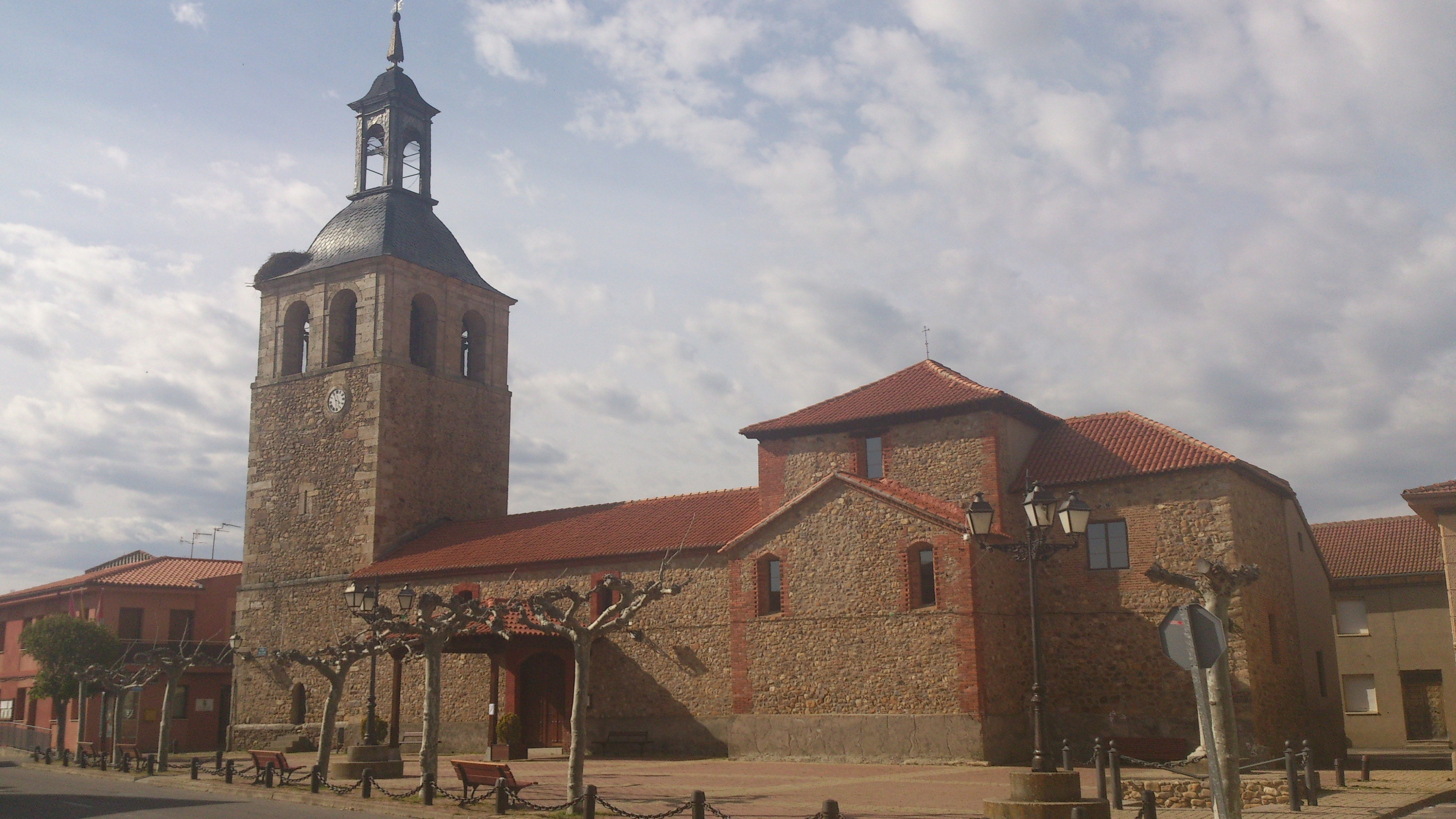

- Coat of arms

- Location within Spain
- Coordinates: 42°38′6″N 5°49′31″W
- Country: Spain
- Autonomous community: Castile and León
- Province: León
- Municipality: Llamas de la Ribera

Government
  - Mayor: Sara Fernández Fernández (PP)

Area
  - Total: 59.88 km^{2} (23.12 sq mi)
- Elevation: 895 m (2,936 ft)

Population (2025-01-01)
  - Total: 783
  - Density: 13.1/km^{2} (33.9/sq mi)
- Demonym(s): llamense; ribereño, ribereña
- Time zone: UTC+1 (CET)
  - Summer (DST): UTC+2 (CEST)
- Postal Code: 24271
- Telephone prefix: 987
- Website: Ayto. de Llamas de la Ribera

Llamas de la Ribera (Spanish pronunciation: [ˈʎamas ðe la riˈβeɾa]; Leonese: Chamas de la Ribeira) is a municipality located in the province of León, Castile and León, Spain. According to the 2025 census (INE), the municipality has a population of 783 inhabitants.
