= List of municipalities in León =

Map of Spain with the province of León highlighted

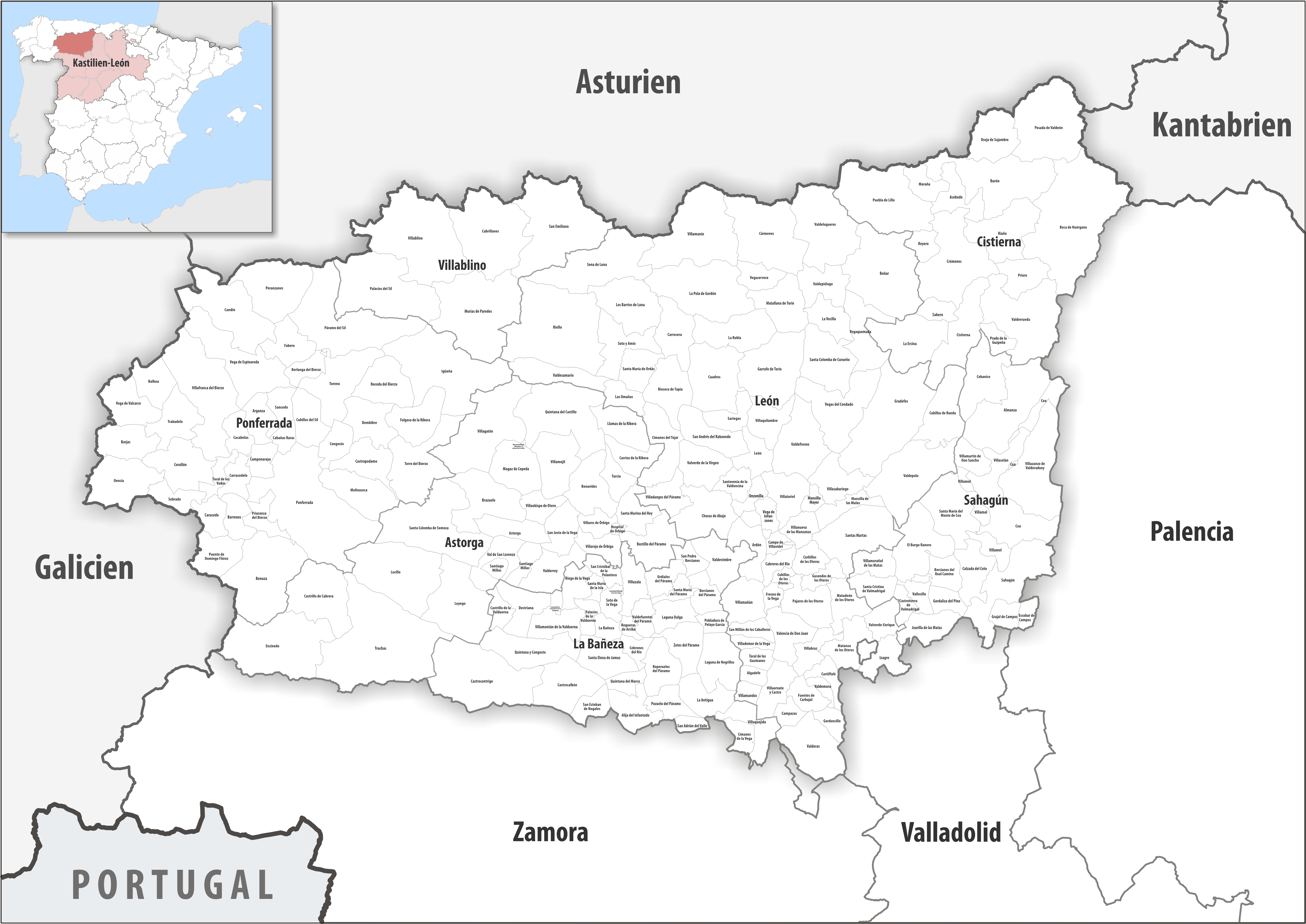
Map of the municipalities in the province of León

León is a province in the autonomous community of Castile and León, Spain. The province is divided into 211 municipalities. As of the 2024 Spanish census, León is the 30th most populous of Spain's 50 provinces, with 447,802 inhabitants, and the 7th largest by land area, spanning 15,567.62 square kilometres (6,010.69 sq mi). Municipalities are the most basic local political division in Spain and can only belong to one province. They enjoy a large degree of autonomy in their local administration, being in charge of tasks such as urban planning, water supply, lighting, roads, local police, and firefighting.

The organisation of municipalities in Spain is outlined by the local government law Ley 7/1985, de 2 de abril, Reguladora de las Bases del Régimen Local (transl. Law 7/1985, of 2 April, Regulating the Bases of the Local Administration), which was passed by the Cortes Generales—Spain’s national parliament—on 2 April 1985 and finalised by royal decree on 18 April 1986. Municipalities in León are also governed by the Statute of Autonomy of Castile and León, which includes provisions concerning their relations with Castile and León's autonomous government. All citizens of Spain are required to register in the municipality in which they reside. Each municipality is a corporation (Note: Within the context of local government in Spain, a corporation is a legal entity representing a municipality. Each municipality is empowered to govern over a specific piece of land and its population.) with independent legal personhood: its governing body is called the ayuntamiento (municipal council or corporation), a term often also used to refer to the municipal offices (city and town halls). The ayuntamiento is composed of the mayor (Spanish: alcalde), the deputy mayors (tenientes de alcalde) and the councillors (concejales), who form the plenary (pleno), the deliberative body. Municipalities are categorised by population for determining the number of councillors: three when the population is up to 100 inhabitants, five for 101–250, seven for 251–1,000, nine for 1,001–2,000, eleven for 2,001–5,000, thirteen for 5,001–10,000, seventeen for 10,001–20,000, twenty-one for 20,001–50,000, and twenty-five for 50,001–100,000. One councillor is added for every additional 100,000 inhabitants, with a further one included if the total would otherwise be even, to avoid tied votes.

The mayor and the deputy mayors are elected by the plenary assembly, which is itself elected by universal suffrage. Elections in municipalities with more than 250 inhabitants are carried out following a proportional representation system with closed lists, whilst those with a population lower than 250 use a block plurality voting system with open lists. The plenary assembly must meet periodically, with meetings occurring more or less frequently depending on the population of the municipality: monthly for those whose population is larger than 20,000, once every two months if it ranges between 5,001 and 20,000, and once every three months if it does not exceed 5,000. Many ayuntamientos also have a local governing board (Spanish: junta de gobierno local), which is appointed by the mayor from amongst the councillors and is required for municipalities of over 5,000 inhabitants. The board, whose role is to assist the mayor between meetings of the plenary assembly, may not include more than one third of the councillors.

The largest municipality by population in the province as of the 2024 Spanish census is León, its capital, with 122,866 residents, while the smallest is Escobar de Campos, with 31 residents. The largest municipality by area is Truchas, which spans 301.38 square kilometres (116.36 sq mi), while Hospital de Órbigo is the smallest at 4.58 square kilometres (1.77 sq mi).

== Municipalities ==
Largest municipalities in the province of León by population

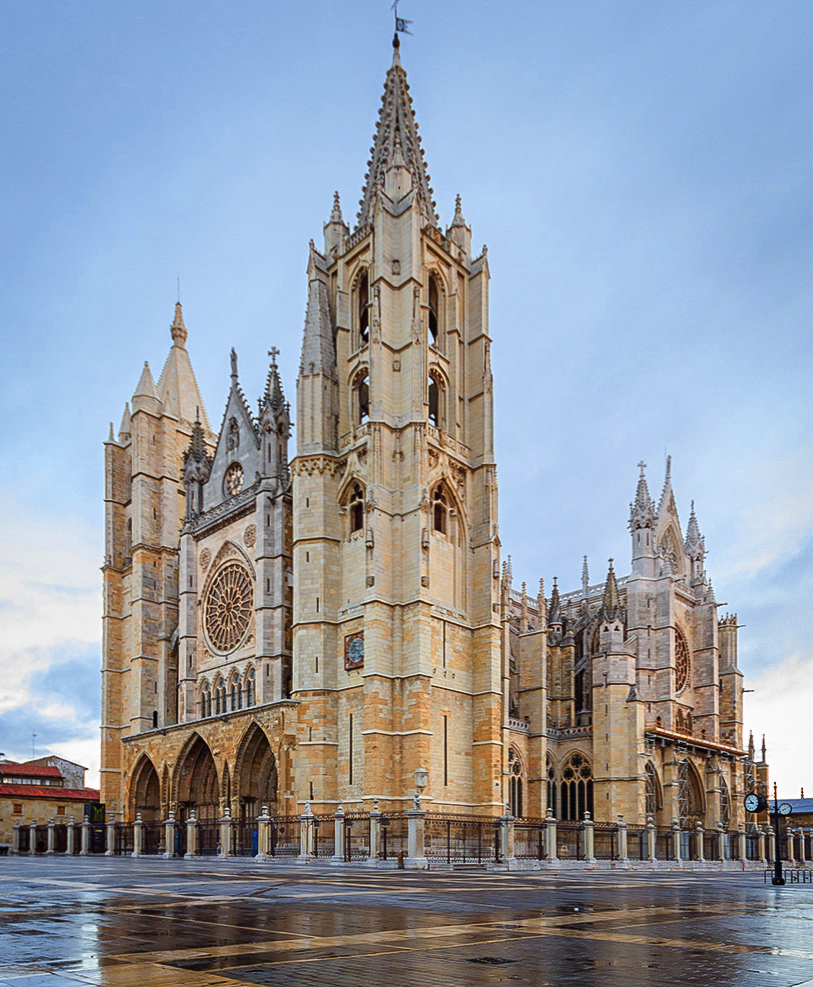
León is the province's capital and largest municipality by population.

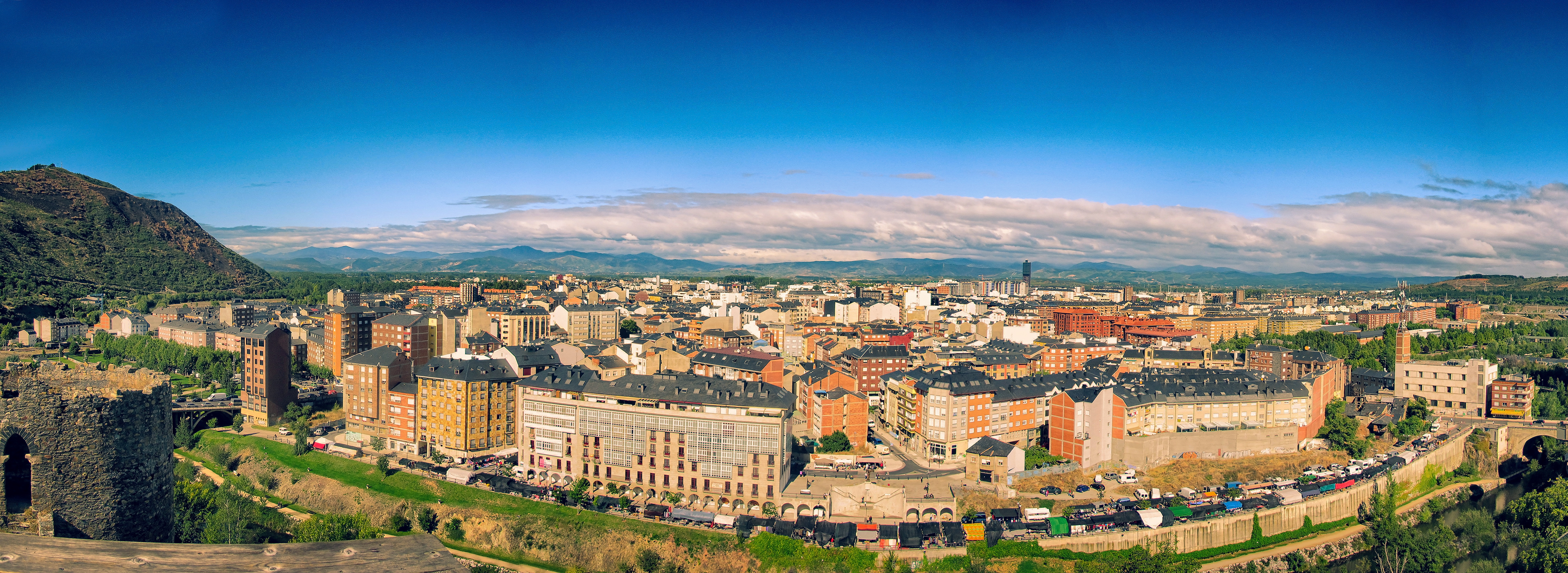
Ponferrada, the second largest municipality by population in León

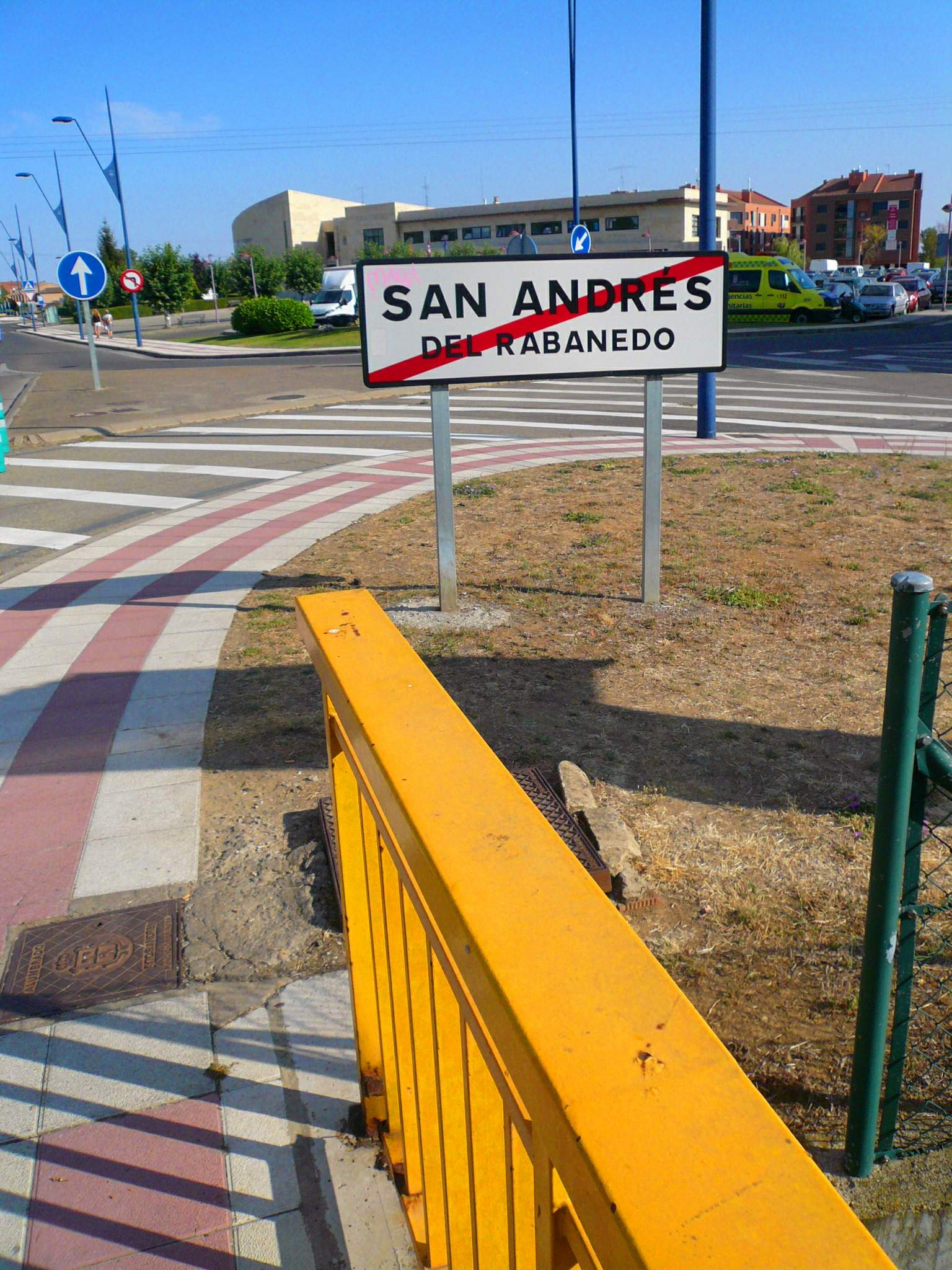
San Andrés del Rabanedo is the province's third largest municipality by population.

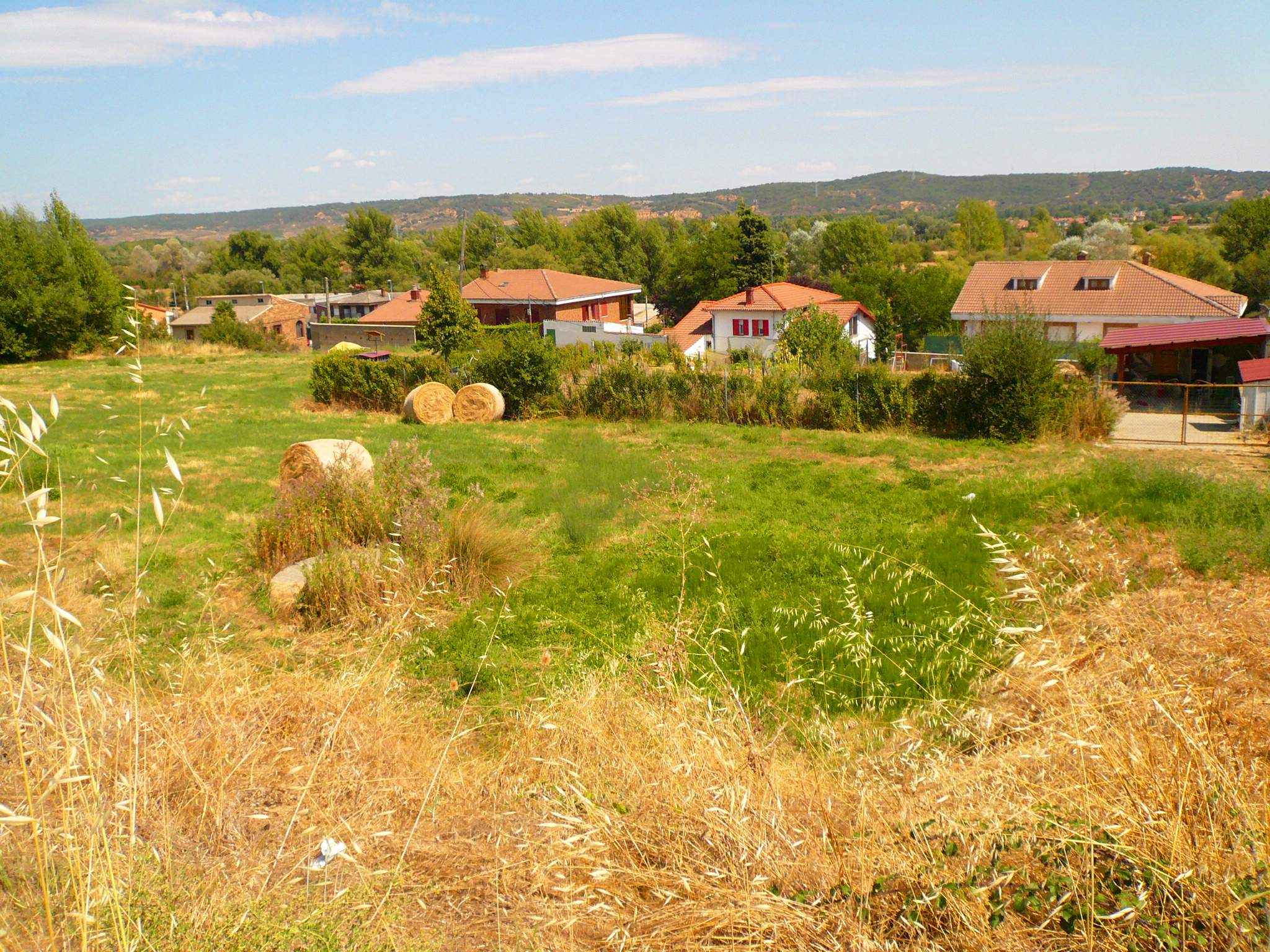
Villaquilambre, León's fourth largest municipality by population

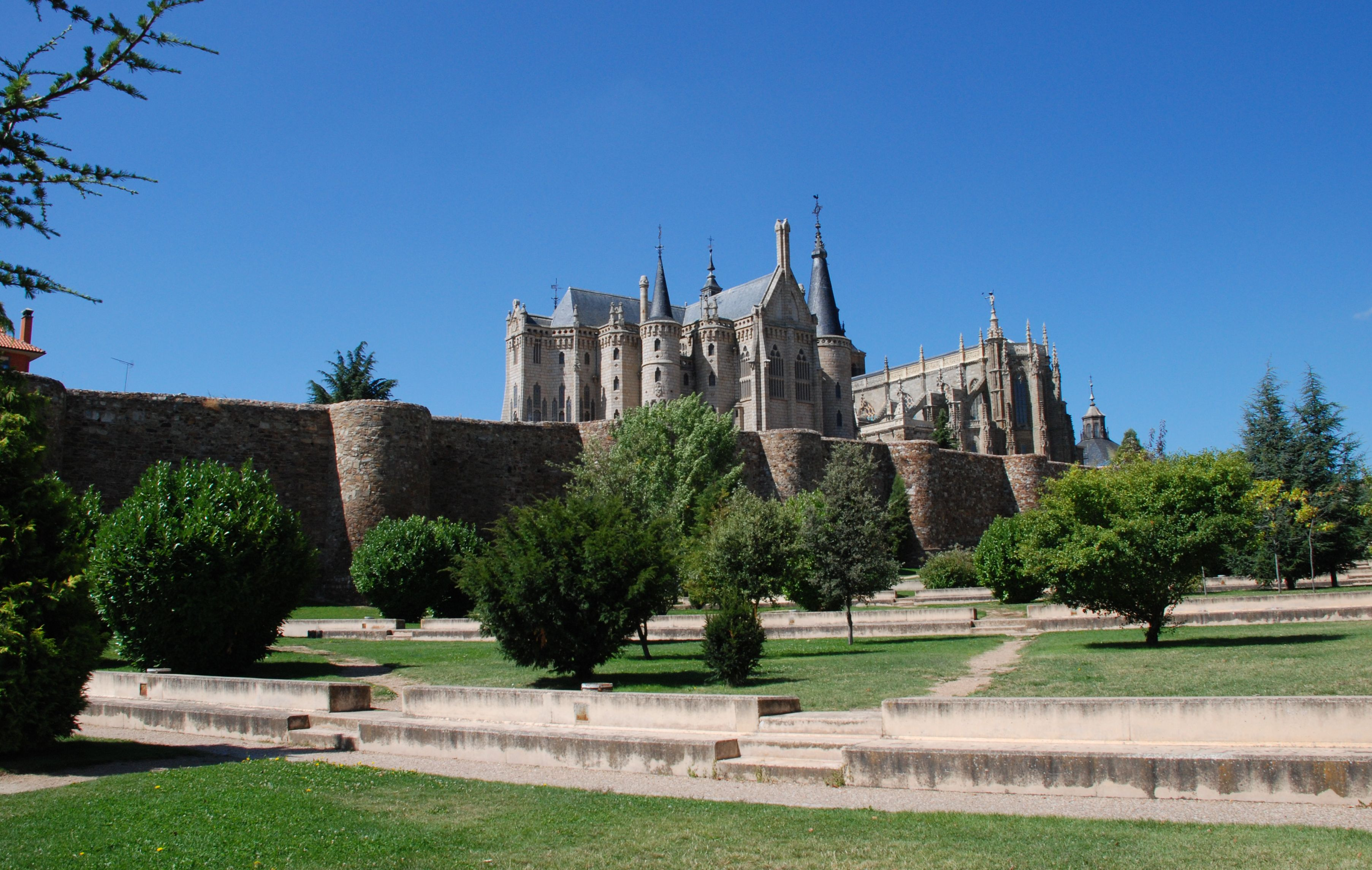
Astorga is the province's fifth most populous municipality.

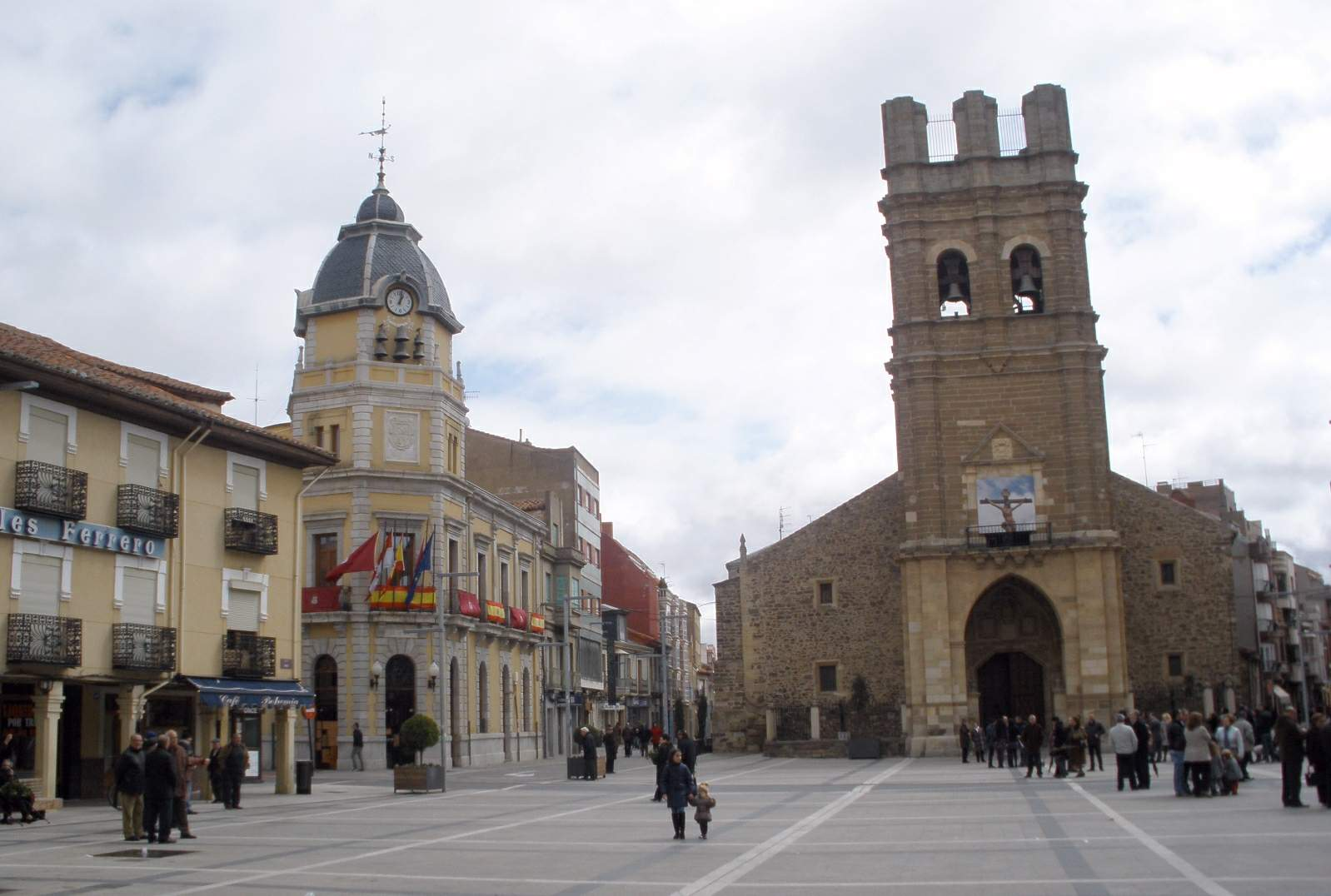
La Bañeza, the sixth largest municipality by population in León

† Provincial capital

Municipalities in the province of León
Name	Population (2024 census)	Population (2011 census)	Population change	Land area (km²)	Population density (2024)
Acebedo	188	257	−26.8%	50.18	3.7/km^{2}
Algadefe	302	298	+1.3%	15.33	19.7/km^{2}
Alija del Infantado	571	790	−27.7%	52.31	10.9/km^{2}
Almanza	603	612	−1.5%	141.99	4.2/km^{2}
La Antigua	327	457	−28.4%	54.70	6.0/km^{2}
Ardón	547	609	−10.2%	48.65	11.2/km^{2}
Arganza	808	848	−4.7%	39.99	20.2/km^{2}
Astorga	10,292	11,801	−12.8%	46.78	220.0/km^{2}
Balboa	265	367	−27.8%	51.04	5.2/km^{2}
La Bañeza	10,137	10,759	−5.8%	19.71	514.3/km^{2}
Barjas	147	230	−36.1%	57.63	2.6/km^{2}
Los Barrios de Luna	292	316	−7.6%	94.29	3.1/km^{2}
Bembibre	8,199	9,851	−16.8%	63.41	129.3/km^{2}
Benavides	3,240	2,752	+17.7%	74.07	43.7/km^{2}
Benuza	452	555	−18.6%	172.90	2.6/km^{2}
Bercianos del Páramo	523	666	−21.5%	35.09	14.9/km^{2}
Bercianos del Real Camino	187	195	−4.1%	34.24	5.5/km^{2}
Berlanga del Bierzo	323	404	−20.0%	27.89	11.6/km^{2}
Boca de Huérgano	426	522	−18.4%	288.71	1.5/km^{2}
Boñar	1,765	2,058	−14.2%	180.62	9.8/km^{2}
Borrenes	302	387	−22.0%	36.38	8.3/km^{2}
Brazuelo	318	327	−2.8%	98.13	3.2/km^{2}
El Burgo Ranero	691	801	−13.7%	98.34	7.0/km^{2}
Burón	288	355	−18.9%	157.72	1.8/km^{2}
Bustillo del Páramo	1,057	1,416	−25.4%	71.77	14.7/km^{2}
Cabañas Raras	1,309	1,315	−0.5%	19.11	68.5/km^{2}
Cabreros del Río	409	472	−13.3%	24.77	16.5/km^{2}
Cabrillanes	710	899	−21.0%	170.45	4.2/km^{2}
Cacabelos	4,749	5,466	−13.1%	32.66	145.4/km^{2}
Calzada del Coto	224	255	−12.2%	56.03	4.0/km^{2}
Campazas	110	145	−24.1%	20.88	5.3/km^{2}
Campo de Villavidel	202	215	−6.0%	13.97	14.5/km^{2}
Camponaraya	4,109	4,201	−2.2%	29.13	141.1/km^{2}
Cármenes	333	436	−23.6%	154.09	2.2/km^{2}
Carracedelo	3,428	3,673	−6.7%	32.43	105.7/km^{2}
Carrizo	2,223	2,504	−11.2%	41.85	53.1/km^{2}
Carrocera	440	552	−20.3%	65.98	6.7/km^{2}
Carucedo	483	659	−26.7%	35.00	13.8/km^{2}
Castilfalé	61	80	−23.8%	25.90	2.4/km^{2}
Castrillo de Cabrera	102	135	−24.4%	115.87	0.9/km^{2}
Castrillo de la Valduerna	143	182	−21.4%	23.51	6.1/km^{2}
Castrocalbón	915	1,072	−14.6%	88.30	10.4/km^{2}
Castrocontrigo	669	889	−24.7%	194.49	3.4/km^{2}
Castropodame	1,580	1,780	−11.2%	59.60	26.5/km^{2}
Castrotierra de Valmadrigal	105	118	−11.0%	23.50	4.5/km^{2}
Cea	378	519	−27.2%	112.34	3.4/km^{2}
Cebanico	145	188	−22.9%	89.75	1.6/km^{2}
Cebrones del Río	438	547	−19.9%	21.24	20.6/km^{2}
Chozas de Abajo	2,699	2,411	+11.9%	100.38	26.9/km^{2}
Cimanes de la Vega	447	544	−17.8%	26.04	17.2/km^{2}
Cimanes del Tejar	742	807	−8.1%	73.94	10.0/km^{2}
Cistierna	2,903	3,666	−20.8%	97.61	29.7/km^{2}
Congosto	1,430	1,671	−14.4%	36.81	38.8/km^{2}
Corbillos de los Oteros	177	229	−22.7%	31.80	5.6/km^{2}
Corullón	835	1,064	−21.5%	78.27	10.7/km^{2}
Crémenes	518	639	−18.9%	153.12	3.4/km^{2}
Cuadros	2,099	1,999	+5.0%	109.70	19.1/km^{2}
Cubillas de los Oteros	137	156	−12.2%	12.48	11.0/km^{2}
Cubillas de Rueda	387	500	−22.6%	86.82	4.5/km^{2}
Cubillos del Sil	1,721	1,852	−7.1%	53.41	32.2/km^{2}
Destriana	429	593	−27.7%	56.22	7.6/km^{2}
Encinedo	637	800	−20.4%	195.01	3.3/km^{2}
La Ercina	432	537	−19.6%	105.02	4.1/km^{2}
Escobar de Campos	31	53	−41.5%	17.14	1.8/km^{2}
Fabero	4,057	5,136	−21.0%	54.47	74.5/km^{2}
Folgoso de la Ribera	980	1,231	−20.4%	69.24	14.2/km^{2}
Fresno de la Vega	480	616	−22.1%	15.14	31.7/km^{2}
Fuentes de Carbajal	76	111	−31.5%	32.13	2.4/km^{2}
Garrafe de Torío	1,638	1,354	+21.0%	125.27	13.1/km^{2}
Gordaliza del Pino	240	284	−15.5%	27.32	8.8/km^{2}
Gordoncillo	308	491	−37.3%	23.36	13.2/km^{2}
Gradefes	924	1,071	−13.7%	205.86	4.5/km^{2}
Grajal de Campos	212	243	−12.8%	25.37	8.4/km^{2}
Gusendos de los Oteros	126	142	−11.3%	24.68	5.1/km^{2}
Hospital de Órbigo	959	996	−3.7%	4.58	209.4/km^{2}
Igüeña	1,052	1,364	−22.9%	206.11	5.1/km^{2}
Izagre	139	202	−31.2%	44.23	3.1/km^{2}
Joarilla de las Matas	248	353	−29.7%	51.47	4.8/km^{2}
Laguna Dalga	624	727	−14.2%	38.41	16.2/km^{2}
Laguna de Negrillos	1,047	1,141	−8.2%	71.80	14.6/km^{2}
León†	122,866	131,411	−6.5%	39.03	3,148.0/km^{2}
Llamas de la Ribera	791	974	−18.8%	59.88	13.2/km^{2}
Lucillo	360	411	−12.4%	164.91	2.2/km^{2}
Luyego	556	753	−26.2%	132.31	4.2/km^{2}
Magaz de Cepeda	349	394	−11.4%	72.64	4.8/km^{2}
Mansilla de las Mulas	1,660	1,895	−12.4%	35.36	46.9/km^{2}
Mansilla Mayor	325	326	−0.3%	14.48	22.4/km^{2}
Maraña	112	159	−29.6%	33.57	3.3/km^{2}
Matadeón de los Oteros	221	274	−19.3%	46.44	4.8/km^{2}
Matallana de Torío	1,234	1,397	−11.7%	73.45	16.8/km^{2}
Matanza	175	228	−23.2%	53.58	3.3/km^{2}
Molinaseca	869	871	−0.2%	79.63	10.9/km^{2}
Murias de Paredes	340	482	−29.5%	202.18	1.7/km^{2}
Noceda del Bierzo	605	767	−21.1%	72.14	8.4/km^{2}
Oencia	280	354	−20.9%	97.74	2.9/km^{2}
Las Omañas	261	316	−17.4%	32.49	8.0/km^{2}
Onzonilla	1,945	1,749	+11.2%	21.78	89.3/km^{2}
Oseja de Sajambre	228	321	−29.0%	71.78	3.2/km^{2}
Pajares de los Oteros	240	366	−34.4%	61.82	3.9/km^{2}
Palacios de la Valduerna	356	452	−21.2%	20.42	17.4/km^{2}
Palacios del Sil	847	1,173	−27.8%	181.41	4.7/km^{2}
Páramo del Sil	1,173	1,413	−17.0%	190.17	6.2/km^{2}
Peranzanes	271	331	−18.1%	117.54	2.3/km^{2}
Pobladura de Pelayo García	361	418	−13.6%	20.17	17.9/km^{2}
La Pola de Gordón	2,856	3,906	−26.9%	157.64	18.1/km^{2}
Ponferrada	62,957	68,383	−7.9%	283.17	222.3/km^{2}
Posada de Valdeón	404	481	−16.0%	164.06	2.5/km^{2}
Pozuelo del Páramo	394	503	−21.7%	36.23	10.9/km^{2}
Prado de la Guzpeña	104	142	−26.8%	22.94	13.3/km^{2}
Priaranza del Bierzo	712	823	−13.5%	33.69	21.1/km^{2}
Prioro	351	407	−13.8%	48.98	7.2/km^{2}
Puebla de Lillo	653	711	−8.2%	171.40	3.8/km^{2}
Puente de Domingo Flórez	1,405	1,645	−14.6%	59.18	23.7/km^{2}
Quintana del Castillo	714	875	−18.4%	155.71	4.6/km^{2}
Quintana del Marco	313	442	−29.2%	23.36	13.4/km^{2}
Quintana y Congosto	420	499	−15.8%	88.52	4.7/km^{2}
Regueras de Arriba	264	336	−21.4%	11.35	23.3/km^{2}
Reyero	127	130	−2.3%	26.20	4.8/km^{2}
Riaño	479	521	−8.1%	100.82	4.8/km^{2}
Riego de la Vega	717	890	−19.4%	35.40	20.3/km^{2}
Riello	585	706	−17.1%	235.93	2.5/km^{2}
Rioseco de Tapia	398	408	−2.5%	72.19	5.5/km^{2}
La Robla	3,629	4,580	−20.8%	85.22	42.6/km^{2}
Roperuelos del Páramo	502	634	−20.8%	54.46	9.2/km^{2}
Sabero	1,024	1,366	−25.0%	24.94	41.1/km^{2}
Sahagún	2,393	2,830	−15.4%	123.64	19.4/km^{2}
San Adrián del Valle	84	119	−29.4%	15.84	5.3/km^{2}
San Andrés del Rabanedo	29,923	31,675	−5.5%	64.84	461.5/km^{2}
Sancedo	528	576	−8.3%	31.00	17.0/km^{2}
San Cristóbal de la Polantera	623	829	−24.8%	24.56	25.4/km^{2}
San Emiliano	597	708	−15.7%	211.05	2.8/km^{2}
San Esteban de Nogales	242	288	−16.0%	32.24	7.5/km^{2}
San Justo de la Vega	1,779	2,019	−11.9%	48.39	36.8/km^{2}
San Millán de los Caballeros	191	187	+2.1%	24.69	7.7/km^{2}
San Pedro Bercianos	224	273	−17.9%	23.51	9.5/km^{2}
Santa Colomba de Curueño	507	555	−8.6%	91.95	5.5/km^{2}
Santa Colomba de Somoza	493	509	−3.1%	179.10	2.8/km^{2}
Santa Cristina de Valmadrigal	277	299	−7.4%	40.02	6.9/km^{2}
Santa Elena de Jamuz	1,018	1,218	−16.4%	62.34	16.3/km^{2}
Santa María de la Isla	443	565	−21.6%	12.75	34.7/km^{2}
Santa María del Monte de Cea	209	270	−22.6%	92.22	2.3/km^{2}
Santa María de Ordás	325	354	−8.2%	45.58	7.1/km^{2}
Santa María del Páramo	3,005	3,173	−5.3%	20.08	149.7/km^{2}
Santa Marina del Rey	1,742	2,092	−16.7%	45.61	38.2/km^{2}
Santas Martas	752	852	−11.7%	118.80	6.3/km^{2}
Santiago Millas	363	344	+5.5%	39.69	9.1/km^{2}
Santovenia de la Valdoncina	2,072	1,975	+4.9%	30.27	68.5/km^{2}
Sariegos	5,454	4,658	+17.1%	36.35	150.0/km^{2}
Sena de Luna	388	410	−5.4%	147.91	2.6/km^{2}
Sobrado	282	369	−23.6%	40.94	6.9/km^{2}
Soto de la Vega	1,495	1,738	−14.0%	23.58	63.4/km^{2}
Soto y Amío	715	901	−20.6%	69.19	10.3/km^{2}
Toral de los Guzmanes	498	565	−11.9%	21.11	23.6/km^{2}
Toral de los Vados	1,754	2,112	−17.0%	24.13	72.7/km^{2}
Toreno	2,868	3,597	−20.3%	103.53	27.7/km^{2}
Torre del Bierzo	1,971	2,455	−19.7%	119.32	16.5/km^{2}
Trabadelo	332	427	−22.2%	69.69	4.8/km^{2}
Truchas	391	507	−22.9%	301.38	1.3/km^{2}
Turcia	986	1,113	−11.4%	31.99	30.8/km^{2}
Urdiales del Páramo	452	546	−17.2%	32.84	13.8/km^{2}
Valdefresno	2,332	2,037	+14.5%	102.48	22.8/km^{2}
Valdefuentes del Páramo	306	361	−15.2%	24.17	12.7/km^{2}
Valdelugueros	486	511	−4.9%	143.47	3.4/km^{2}
Valdemora	61	85	−28.2%	13.40	4.6/km^{2}
Valdepiélago	307	359	−14.5%	56.81	5.4/km^{2}
Valdepolo	1,211	1,332	−9.1%	142.54	8.5/km^{2}
Valderas	1,508	1,946	−22.5%	99.63	15.1/km^{2}
Valderrey	417	487	−14.4%	60.23	6.9/km^{2}
Valderrueda	820	975	−15.9%	160.78	5.1/km^{2}
Valdesamario	175	218	−19.7%	61.73	2.8/km^{2}
Val de San Lorenzo	492	579	−15.0%	49.49	9.9/km^{2}
Valdevimbre	917	1,022	−10.3%	68.01	13.5/km^{2}
Valencia de Don Juan	5,159	5,112	+0.9%	58.50	88.2/km^{2}
Valverde de la Virgen	7,802	7,021	+11.1%	63.63	122.6/km^{2}
Valverde-Enrique	152	188	−19.1%	35.90	4.2/km^{2}
Vallecillo	103	134	−23.1%	23.36	4.4/km^{2}
Valle de Ancares (Note: The municipality, formerly known as Candín, changed its name to Valle de Ancares in 2024.)	275	325	−15.4%	139.62	2.0/km^{2}
La Vecilla	381	417	−8.6%	44.29	8.6/km^{2}
Vegacervera	259	347	−25.4%	34.89	7.4/km^{2}
Vega de Espinareda	2,005	2,424	−17.3%	132.01	15.2/km^{2}
Vega de Infanzones	841	920	−8.6%	20.80	40.4/km^{2}
Vega de Valcarce	553	711	−22.2%	69.31	8.0/km^{2}
Vegaquemada	435	464	−6.2%	72.95	6.0/km^{2}
Vegas del Condado	1,158	1,183	−2.1%	122.90	9.4/km^{2}
Villablino	7,719	10,238	−24.6%	228.24	33.8/km^{2}
Villabraz	95	113	−15.9%	36.97	2.6/km^{2}
Villadangos del Páramo	1,235	1,123	+10.0%	44.93	27.5/km^{2}
Villademor de la Vega	291	390	−25.4%	16.63	17.5/km^{2}
Villafranca del Bierzo	2,679	3,424	−21.8%	177.37	15.1/km^{2}
Villagatón	645	636	+1.4%	167.06	3.9/km^{2}
Villamandos	276	320	−13.7%	16.23	17.0/km^{2}
Villamanín	878	1,104	−20.5%	175.84	5.0/km^{2}
Villamañán	1,077	1,269	−15.1%	57.80	18.6/km^{2}
Villamartín de Don Sancho	148	158	−6.3%	31.66	4.7/km^{2}
Villamejil	654	775	−15.6%	78.98	8.3/km^{2}
Villamol	136	180	−24.4%	39.63	3.4/km^{2}
Villamontán de la Valduerna	683	859	−20.5%	56.98	12.0/km^{2}
Villamoratiel de las Matas	121	155	−21.9%	37.23	3.3/km^{2}
Villanueva de las Manzanas	503	525	−4.2%	31.89	15.8/km^{2}
Villaobispo de Otero	517	652	−20.7%	31.79	16.3/km^{2}
Villaornate y Castro	352	402	−12.4%	48.28	7.3/km^{2}
Villaquejida	805	976	−17.5%	53.42	15.1/km^{2}
Villaquilambre	18,710	18,054	+3.6%	52.69	355.1/km^{2}
Villarejo de Órbigo	2,877	3,223	−10.7%	36.25	79.4/km^{2}
Villares de Órbigo	561	704	−20.3%	25.85	21.7/km^{2}
Villasabariego	1,147	1,248	−8.1%	59.85	19.2/km^{2}
Villaselán	182	226	−19.5%	56.52	3.2/km^{2}
Villaturiel	1,832	1,955	−6.3%	57.02	32.1/km^{2}
Villazala	598	781	−23.4%	45.42	13.2/km^{2}
Villazanzo de Valderaduey	367	525	−30.1%	145.88	2.5/km^{2}
Zotes del Páramo	401	487	−17.7%	53.94	7.4/km^{2}
Province of León	447,802	493,312	−9.2%	15,567.62	28.8/km^{2}
Castile and León	2,391,682	2,540,188	−5.8%	93,864.10	25.5/km^{2}
Spain	48,619,695	46,815,916	+3.9%	504,755.17	96.3/km^{2}

== See also ==
- Geography of Spain
- List of municipalities of Spain
