= Villademor de la Vega =

Coordinates: 42°16′N 5°34′W

- municipality
- Flag Coat of arms
- Interactive map of Villademor de la Vega
- Country: Spain
- Autonomous community: Castile and León
- Province: León
- Municipality: Villademor de la Vega

Area
  - Total: 1,663 km^{2} (642 sq mi)
- Elevation: 752 m (2,467 ft)

Population (2025-01-01)
  - Total: 289
  - Density: 2,345/km^{2} (6,070/sq mi)
- Time zone: UTC+1 (CET)
  - Summer (DST): UTC+2 (CEST)
- Website: http://www.aytovillademordelavega.es/

Villademor de la Vega is a municipality located in the province of León, Castile and León, Spain. According to the 2013 census (INE), the municipality has a population of 390 inhabitants.

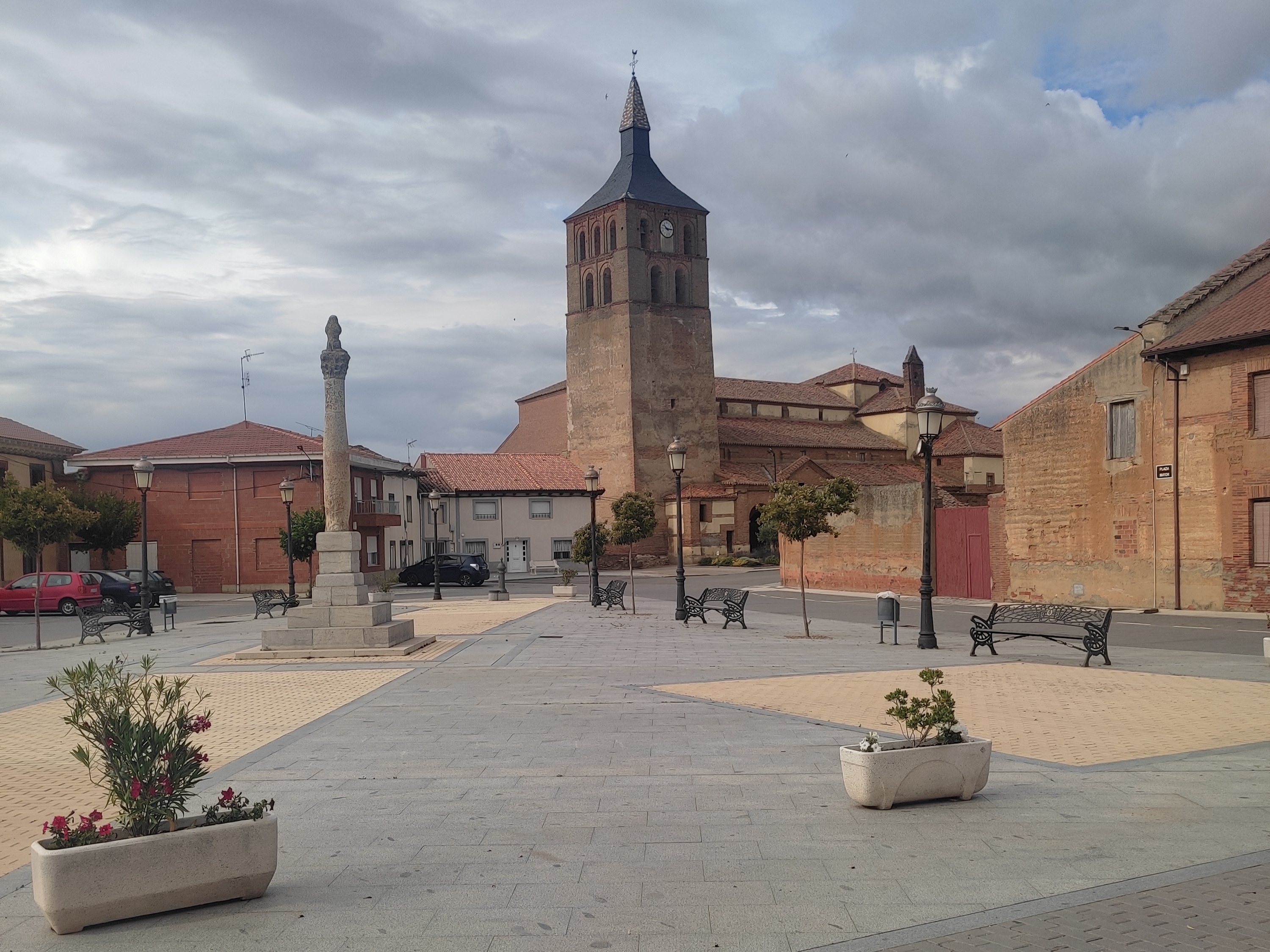
Villademor de la Vega
