= Villazala =

Coordinates: 42°22′N 5°51′W

- municipality
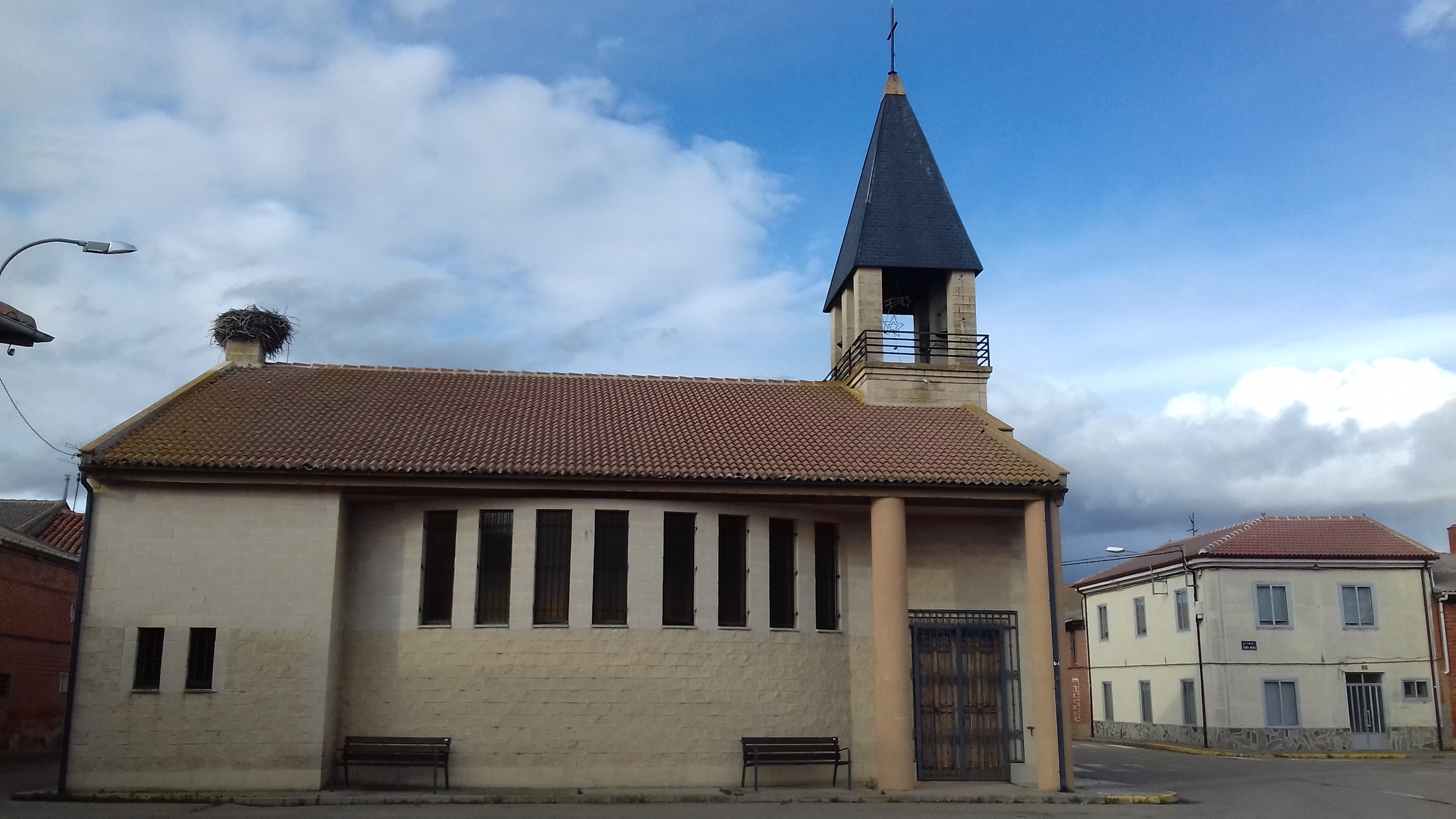
- San Andrés church in Villazala

- Flag Coat of arms
- Interactive map of Villazala
- Country: Spain
- Autonomous community: Castile and León
- Province: León
- Municipality: Villazala

Area
  - Total: 45.42 km^{2} (17.54 sq mi)
- Elevation: 796 m (2,612 ft)

Population (2025-01-01)
  - Total: 560
  - Density: 12/km^{2} (32/sq mi)
- Time zone: UTC+1 (CET)
  - Summer (DST): UTC+2 (CEST)

Villazala is a municipality located in the province of León, Castile and León, Spain. According to the 2004 census (INE), the municipality had a population of 962 inhabitants.
