= Joarilla de las Matas =

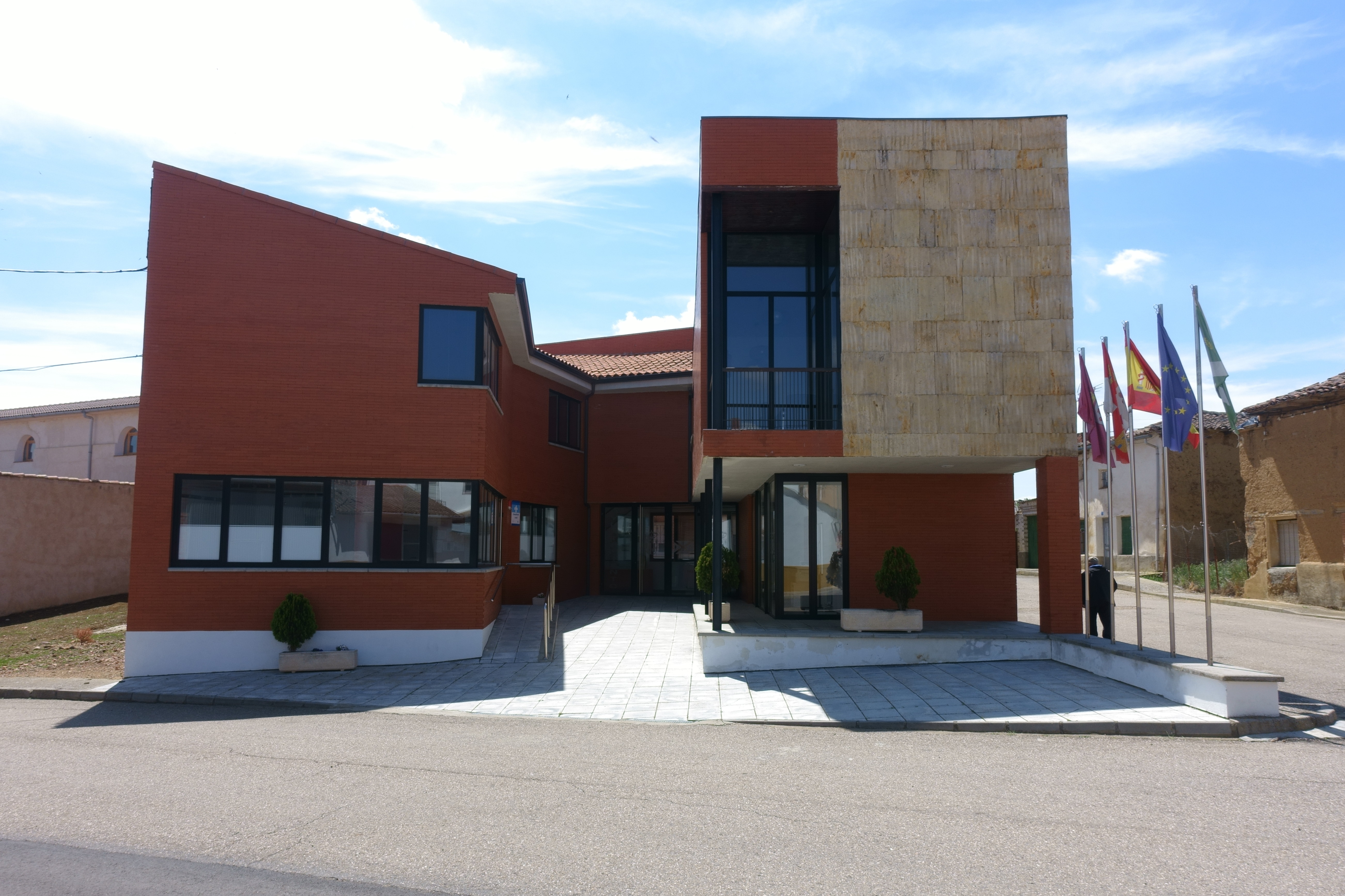
- Town hall

- Flag Coat of arms

- Location within Spain
- Coordinates: 42°17′18″N 5°10′38″W
- Country: Spain
- Autonomous community: Castile and León
- Province: León
- Municipality: Joarilla de las Matas

Government
  - Mayor: Santiago García Mencía (PP)

Area
  - Total: 51.47 km^{2} (19.87 sq mi)
- Elevation: 792 m (2,598 ft)

Population (2025-01-01)
  - Total: 241
  - Density: 4.68/km^{2} (12.1/sq mi)
- Time zone: UTC+1 (CET)
  - Summer (DST): UTC+2 (CEST)
- Postal Code: 24324
- Telephone prefix: 987
- Climate: Cfb

Joarilla de las Matas (Spanish pronunciation: [xo.aˈɾiʎa ðe las ˈmatas]) is a municipality in the province of León, Castile and León, Spain. According to the 2010 census (INE), the municipality had a population of 366 inhabitants.
