= San Cristóbal de la Polantera =

Coordinates: 42°23′N 5°54′W

San Cristóbal de la Polantera, Spain
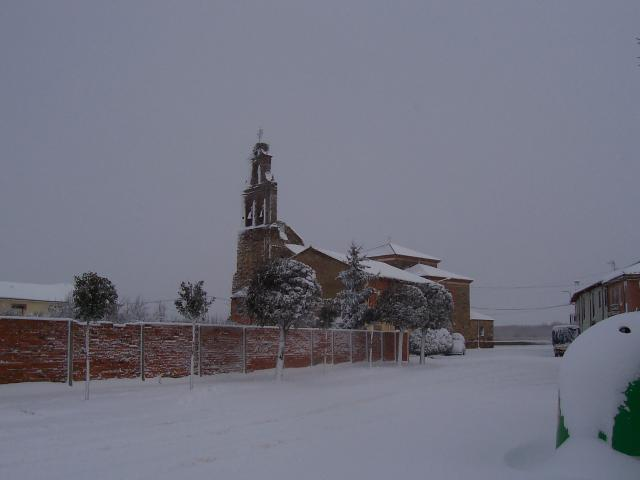

- Flag Coat of arms
- Interactive map of San Cristóbal de la Polantera, Spain
- Country: Spain
- Autonomous community: Castile and León
- Province: León
- Municipality: San Cristóbal de la Polantera

Area
  - Total: 24.56 km^{2} (9.48 sq mi)

Population (2025-01-01)
  - Total: 611
  - Density: 24.9/km^{2} (64.4/sq mi)
- Time zone: UTC+1 (CET)
  - Summer (DST): UTC+2 (CEST)

San Cristóbal de la Polantera is a municipality located in the province of León, Castile and León, Spain. According to the 2022 census (INE), the municipality has a population of 653 inhabitants.
