= Roperuelos del Páramo =

Coordinates: 42°14′N 5°47′W

Roperuelos del Páramo, Spain
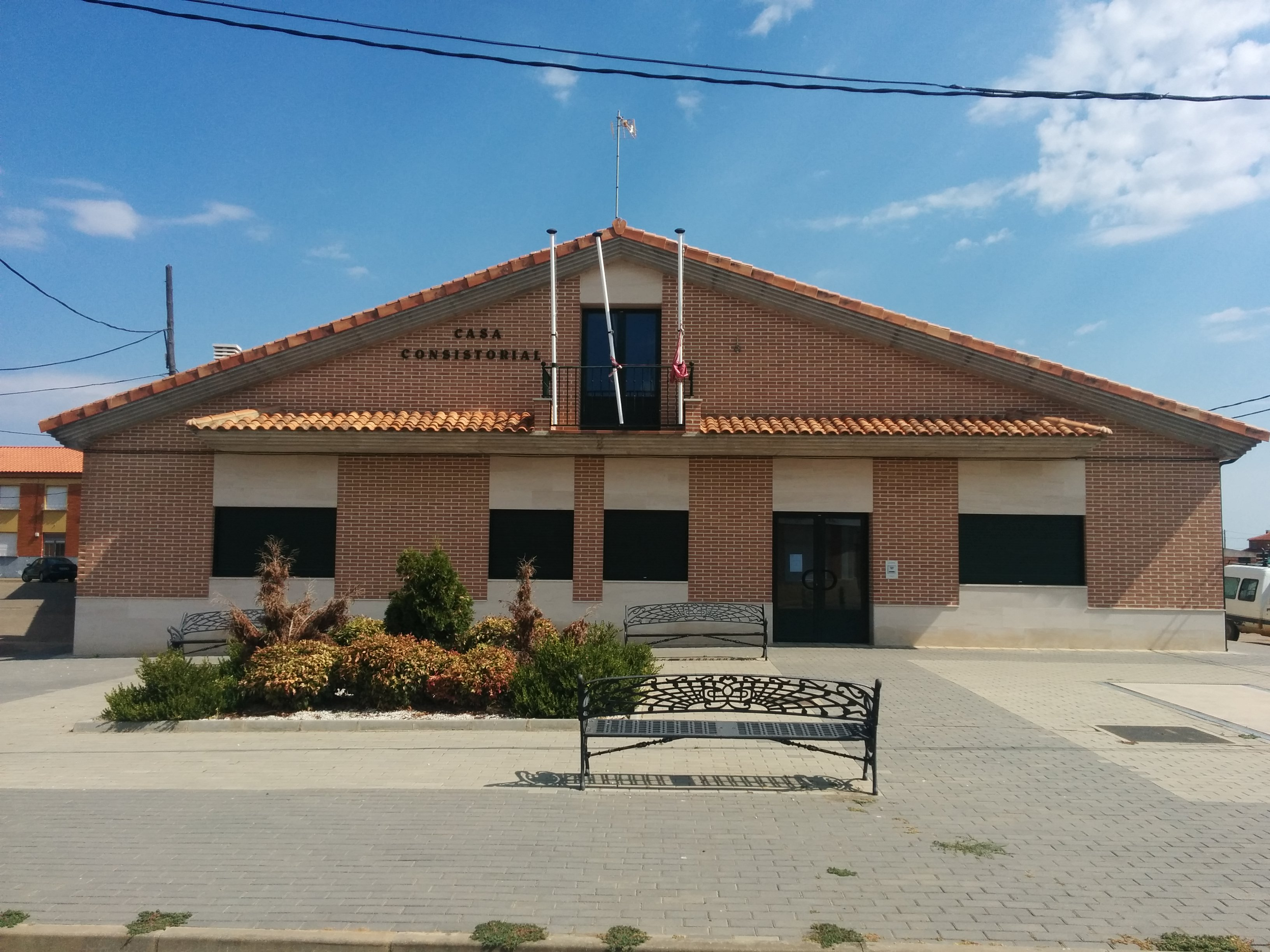
- Town hall of Roperuelos del Páramo
- Interactive map of Roperuelos del Páramo, Spain
- Country: Spain
- Autonomous community: Castile and León
- Province: León
- Municipality: Roperuelos del Páramo

Area
  - Total: 54 km^{2} (21 sq mi)

Population (2025-01-01)
  - Total: 502
  - Density: 9.3/km^{2} (24/sq mi)
- Time zone: UTC+1 (CET)
  - Summer (DST): UTC+2 (CEST)

Roperuelos del Páramo is a municipality located in the province of León, Castile and León, Spain. According to the 2004 census (INE), the municipality has a population of 737 inhabitants.
