= Crémenes =

Crémenes, Spain
- municipality
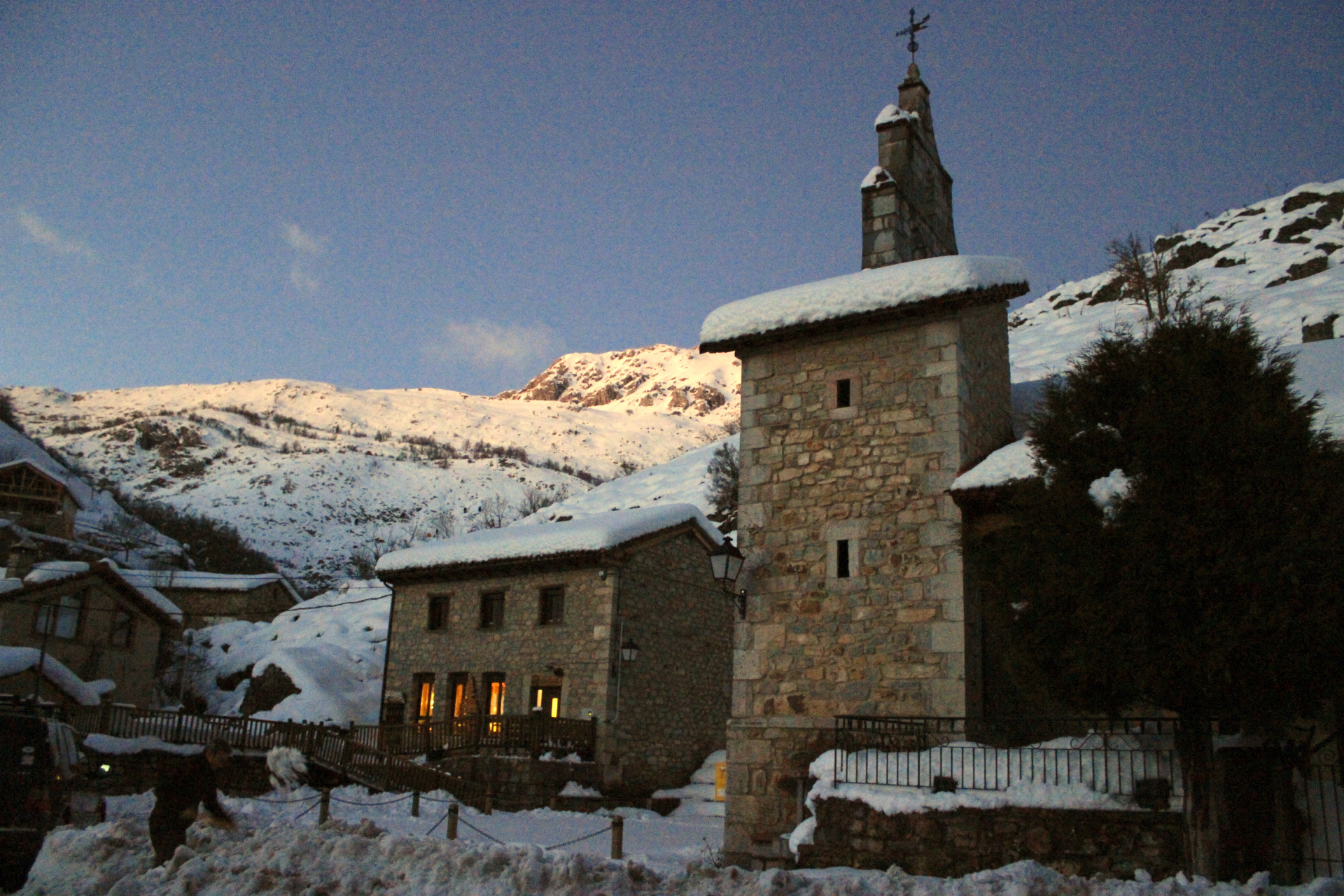
- Church and school in Las Salas, Crémenes

- Location within Spain
- Coordinates: 42°54′10″N 5°8′35″W
- Country: Spain
- Autonomous community: Castile and León
- Province: León
- Municipality: Crémenes

Government
  - Mayor: Miguel Ángel Díez Alonso (PP)

Area
  - Total: 153.12 km^{2} (59.12 sq mi)
- Elevation: 1,003 m (3,291 ft)

Population (2025-01-01)
  - Total: 497
  - Density: 3.25/km^{2} (8.41/sq mi)
- Demonym: cremenita
- Time zone: UTC+1 (CET)
  - Summer (DST): UTC+2 (CEST)
- Postal Code: 24980
- Telephone prefix: 987
- Website: Ayto. de Crémenes

Crémenes (Spanish pronunciation: [ˈkɾemenes]) is a municipality located in the province of León, Castile and León, Spain. According to the 2010 census (INE), the municipality has a population of 660 inhabitants.
