= Algadefe =

- municipality
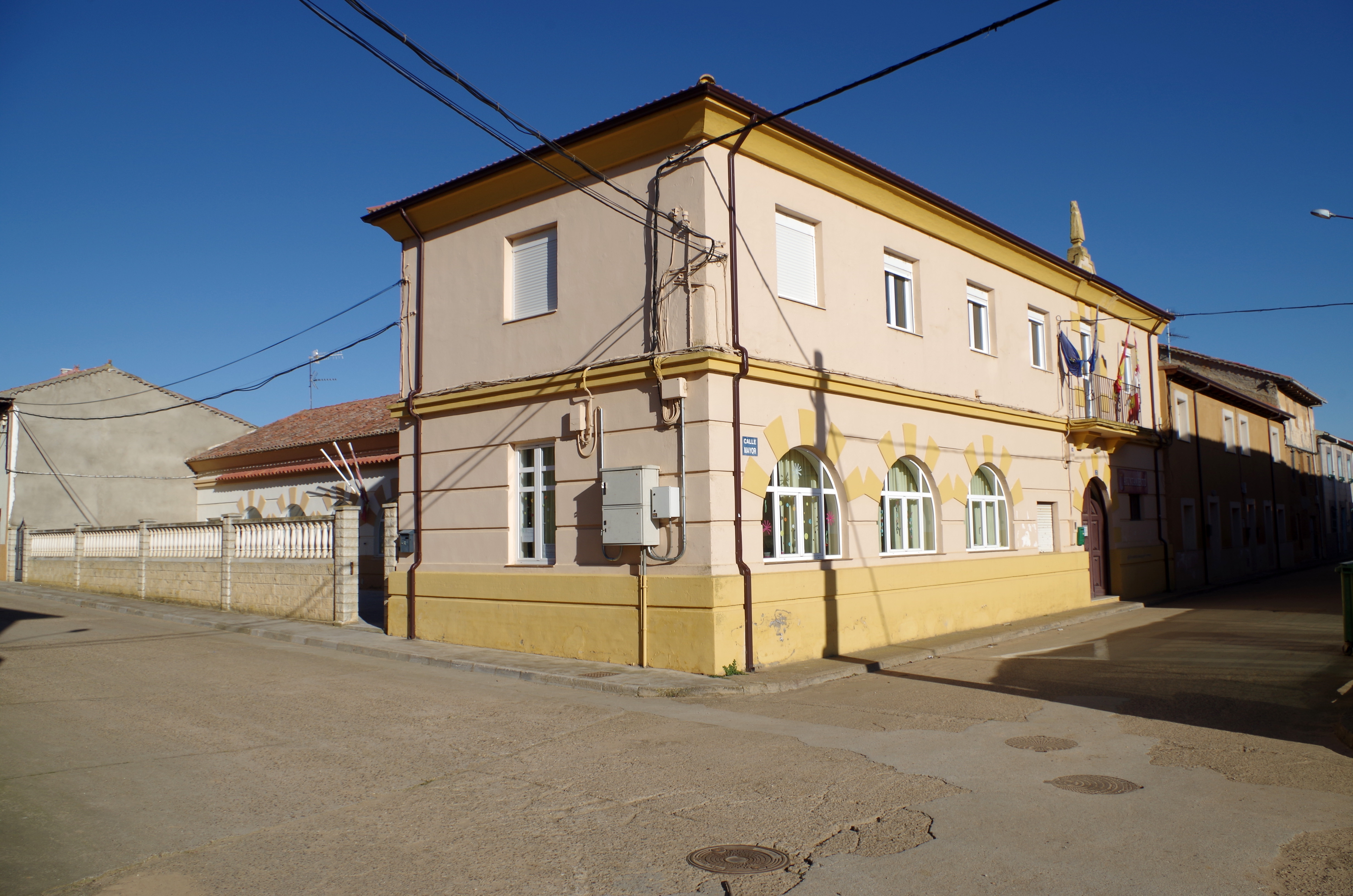

- Location within Spain
- Coordinates: 42°13′4″N 5°34′58″W
- Country: Spain
- Autonomous community: Castile and León
- Province: León
- Municipality: Algadefe

Government
  - Mayor: Víctor Manuel Merino García (PP)

Area
  - Total: 15.33 km^{2} (5.92 sq mi)
- Elevation: 743 m (2,438 ft)

Population (2025-01-01)
  - Total: 312
  - Density: 20.4/km^{2} (52.7/sq mi)
- Demonyms: algadefudo, algadefuda
- Time zone: UTC+1 (CET)
  - Summer (DST): UTC+2 (CEST)
- Postal Code: 24238
- Telephone prefix: 987
- Climate: Csb

Algadefe is a municipality located in the province of León, Castile and León, Spain. According to the 2010 census (INE), the municipality has a population of 315 inhabitants.
