= Cebanico =

- municipality
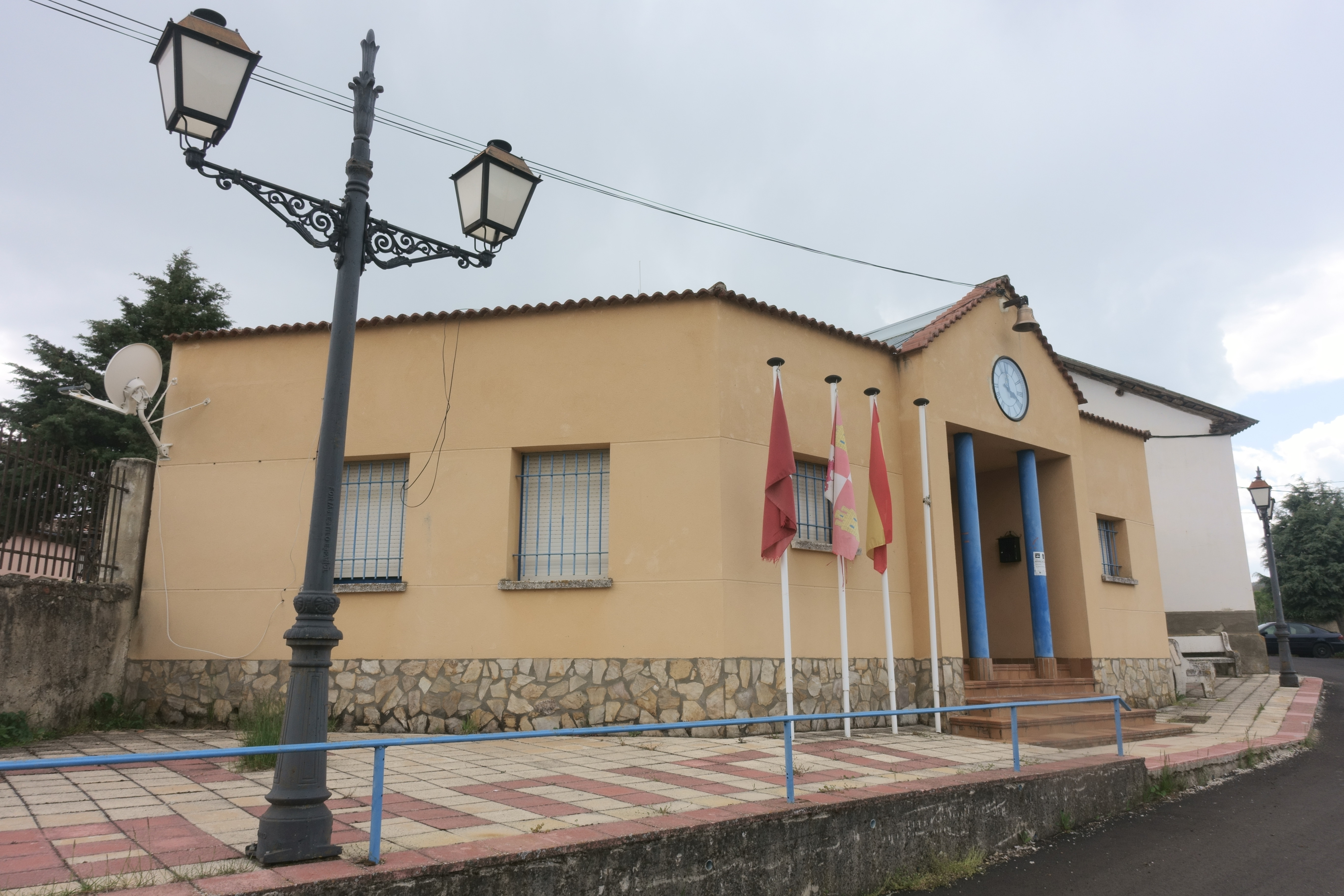
- Town hall

- Coat of arms

- Location within Spain
- Coordinates: 42°43′31″N 5°1′31″W
- Country: Spain
- Autonomous community: Castile and León
- Province: León
- Municipality: Cebanico

Government
  - Mayor: Manuel Jesús Rodríguez Ortega (PSOE)

Area
  - Total: 89.75 km^{2} (34.65 sq mi)
- Elevation: 954 m (3,130 ft)

Population (2025-01-01)
  - Total: 146
  - Density: 1.63/km^{2} (4.21/sq mi)
- Time zone: UTC+1 (CET)
  - Summer (DST): UTC+2 (CEST)
- Postal Code: 24892
- Telephone prefix: 987
- Climate: Cfb
- Website: Ayto. de Cebanico

Cebanico (Spanish pronunciation: [θeβaˈniko]) is a municipality located in the province of León, Castile and León, Spain. According to the 2010 census (INE), the municipality had a population of 195 inhabitants.
