= Cubillas de los Oteros =

Cubillas de los Oteros, Spain
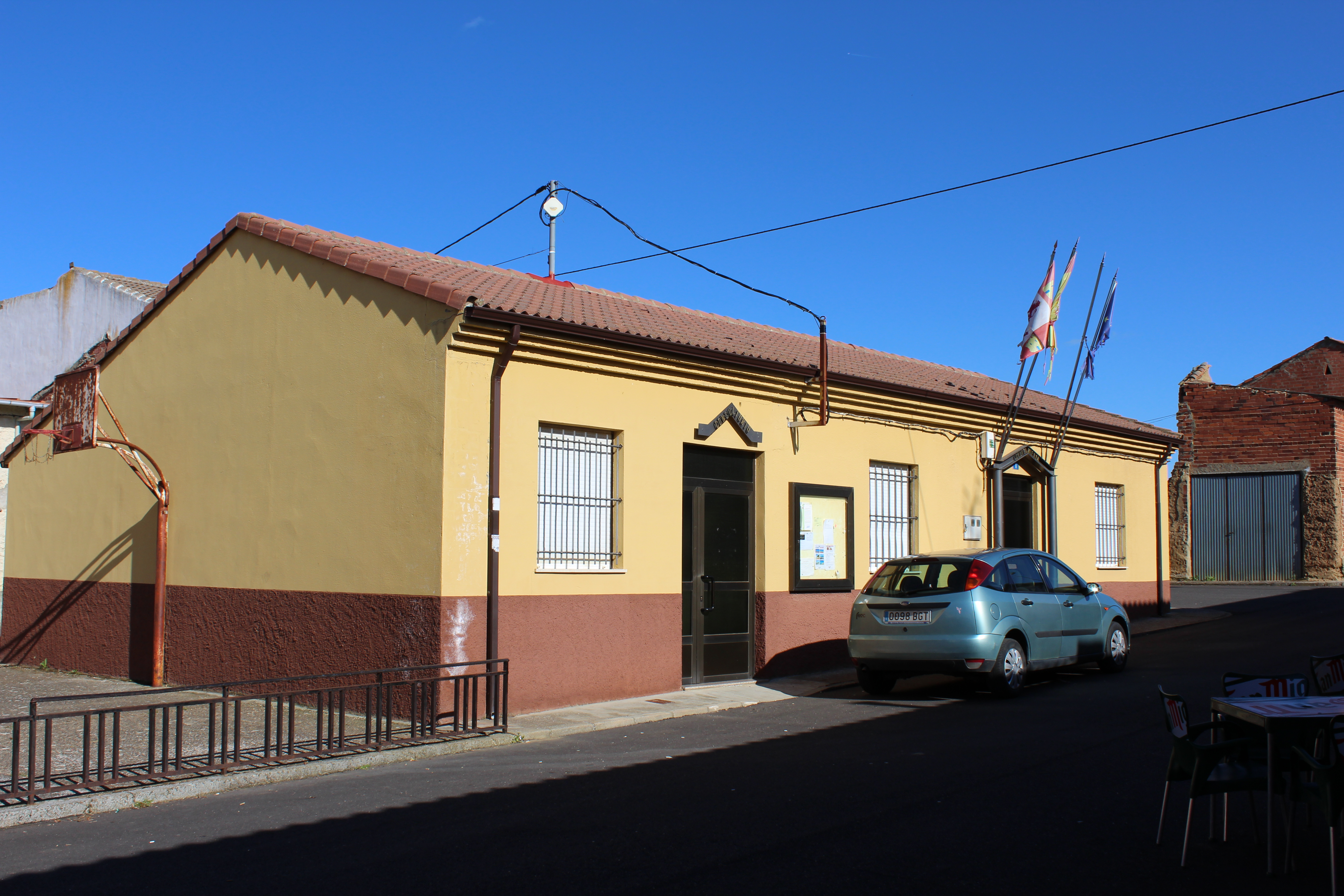
- Cubillas de los Oteros Town Hall

- Location within Spain
- Coordinates: 42°22′22″N 5°30′27″W
- Country: Spain
- Autonomous community: Castile and León
- Province: León
- Municipality: Cubillas de los Oteros

Government
  - Mayor: Gerardo García Nava (PSOE)

Area
  - Total: 12.48 km^{2} (4.82 sq mi)
- Elevation: 777 m (2,549 ft)

Population (2025-01-01)
  - Total: 140
  - Density: 11/km^{2} (29/sq mi)
- Demonym: cubillense
- Time zone: UTC+1 (CET)
  - Summer (DST): UTC+2 (CEST)
- Postal Code: 24224
- Telephone prefix: 987

Cubillas de los Oteros (Spanish pronunciation: [kuˈβiʎas ðe los oˈteɾos]) is a municipality located in the province of León, Castile and León, Spain. According to the 2010 census (INE), the municipality has a population of 167 inhabitants.
