= La Ercina =

La Ercina, Spain
- municipality
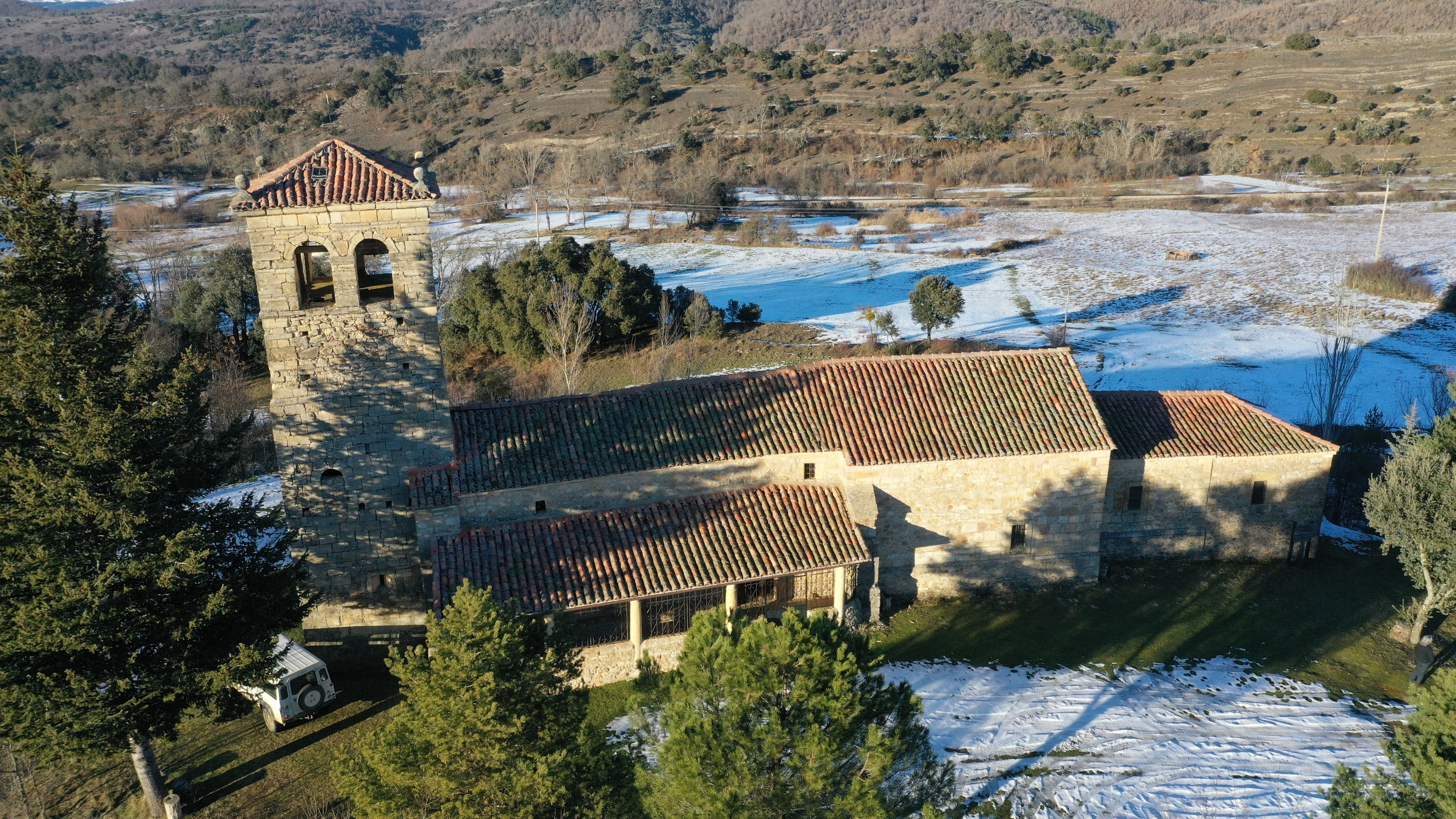
- Church of Santa Marina in La Ercina

- Flag Coat of arms

- Location within Spain
- Coordinates: 42°48′44″N 5°13′5″W
- Country: Spain
- Autonomous community: Castile and León
- Province: León
- Municipality: Alija del Infantado

Government
  - Mayor: Baltasar Epifanio Fernández Valladares (PSOE)

Area
  - Total: 105.02 km^{2} (40.55 sq mi)
- Elevation: 1,102 m (3,615 ft)

Population (2025-01-01)
  - Total: 412
  - Density: 3.92/km^{2} (10.2/sq mi)
- Time zone: UTC+1 (CET)
  - Summer (DST): UTC+2 (CEST)
- Postal Code: 24870
- Telephone prefix: 987
- Website: Ayto. De La Ercina

La Ercina (Spanish pronunciation: [la eɾˈθina]) is a municipality located in the province of León, Castile and León, Spain. According to the 2004 census (INE), the municipality has a population of 681 inhabitants.
