= Villaquejida =

Coordinates: 42°09′N 5°36′W

- municipality
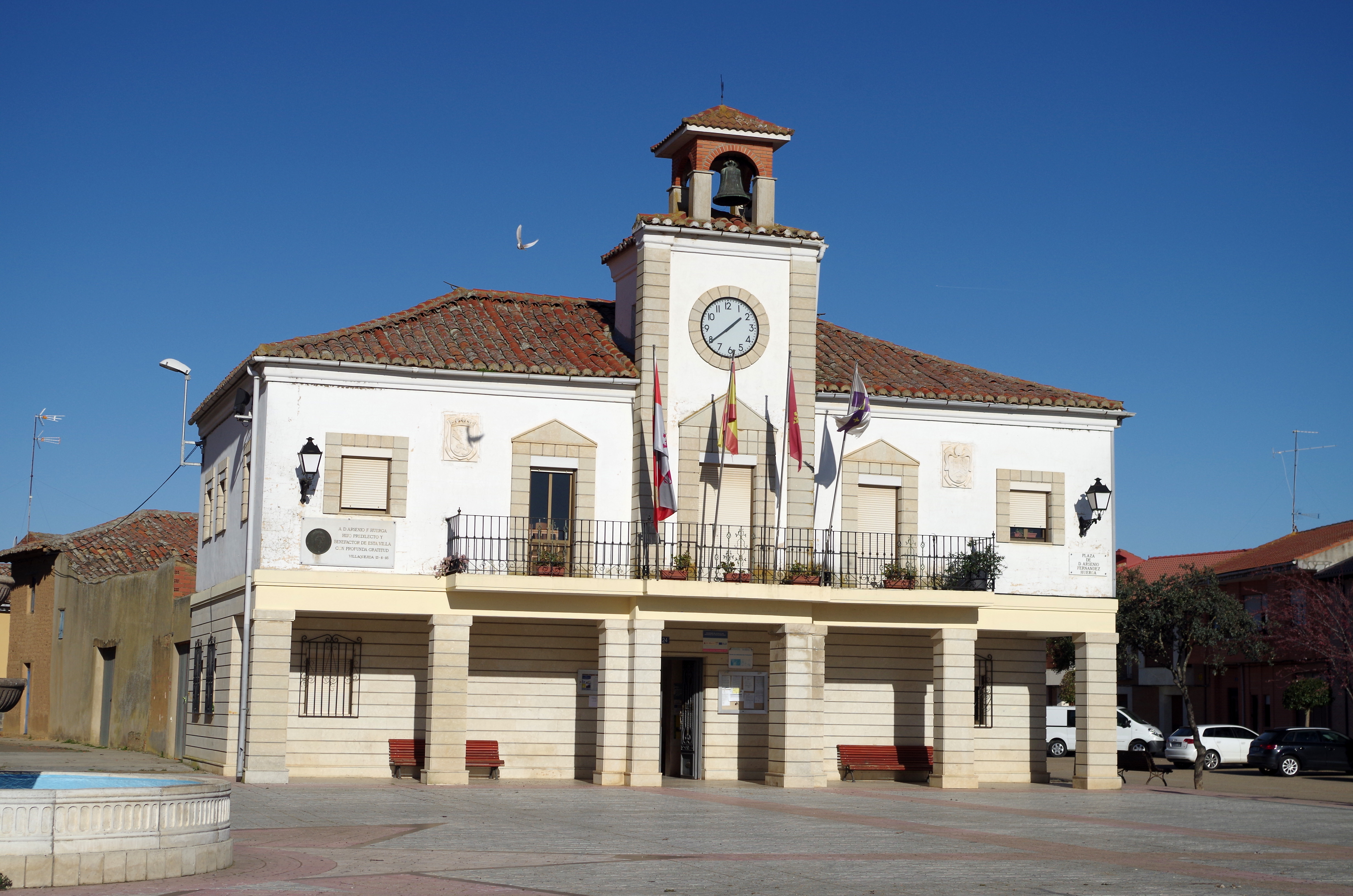

- Flag Coat of arms
- Interactive map of Villaquejida
- Country: Spain
- Autonomous community: Castile and León
- Province: León
- Municipality: Villaquejida

Area
  - Total: 53.24 km^{2} (20.56 sq mi)
- Elevation: 725 m (2,379 ft)

Population (2025-01-01)
  - Total: 763
  - Density: 14.3/km^{2} (37.1/sq mi)
- Time zone: UTC+1 (CET)
  - Summer (DST): UTC+2 (CEST)

Villaquejida is a municipality located in the province of León, Castile and León, Spain. According to the 2004 census (INE), the municipality had a population of 1,040 inhabitants.

== Demographics ==
Ethnic Group	Population
Argentines	4%
Natives	94%
Cubans	1.8%
Moroccans	0.2%

Estimation
