= Bercianos del Páramo =

Bercianos del Páramo Bercianos del Páramu
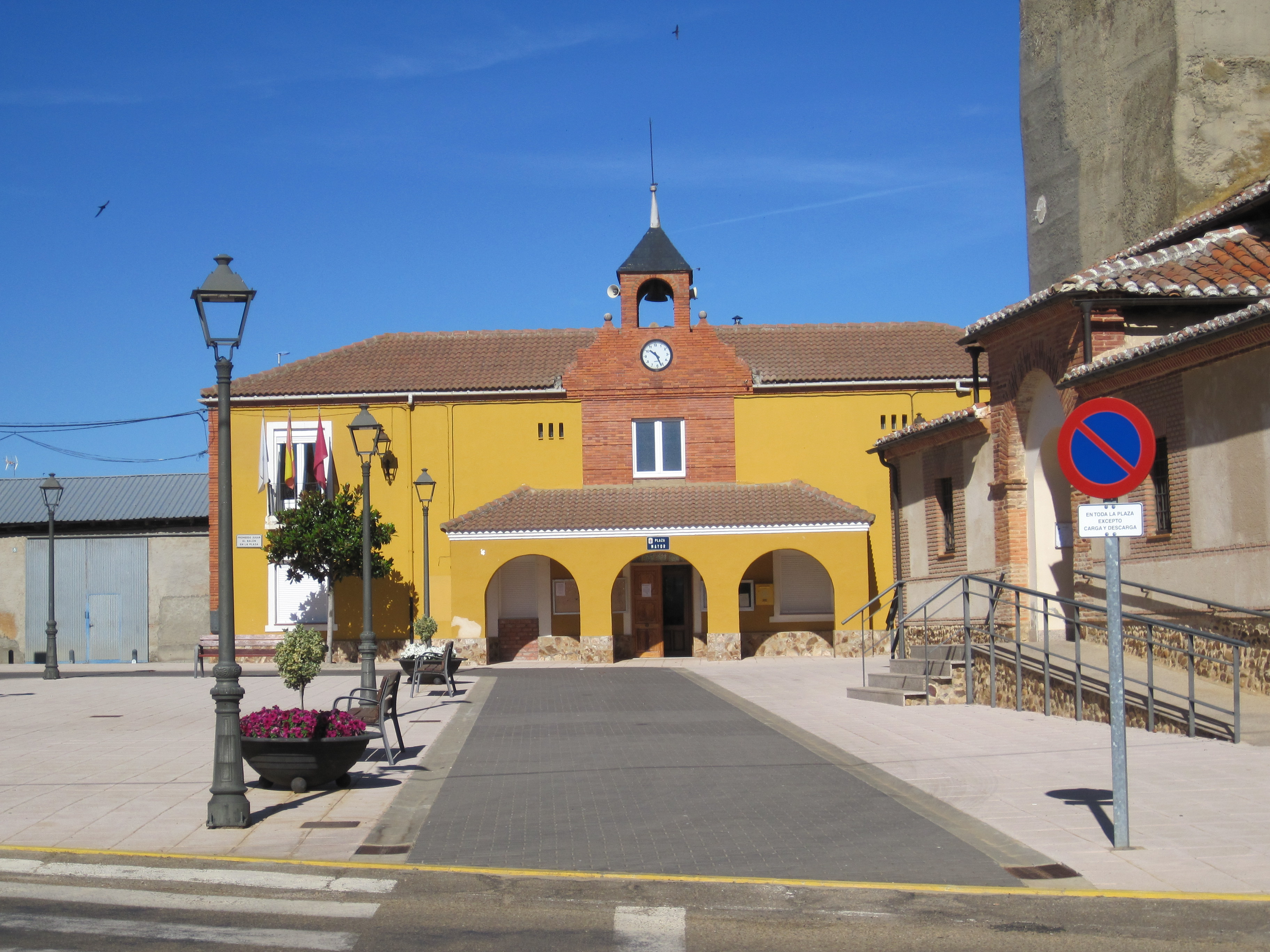
- Town hall

- Coat of arms

- Location within Spain
- Coordinates: 42°22′50″N 5°42′12″W
- Country: Spain
- Autonomous community: Castile and León
- Province: León
- Municipality: Bercianos del Páramo

Government
  - Mayor: María Milagros Benéitez Barragán (PP)

Area
  - Total: 35.09 km^{2} (13.55 sq mi)
- Elevation: 818 m (2,684 ft)

Population (2025-01-01)
  - Total: 513
  - Density: 14.6/km^{2} (37.9/sq mi)
- Time zone: UTC+1 (CET)
  - Summer (DST): UTC+2 (CEST)
- Postal Code: 24252
- Telephone prefix: 987
- Website: https://web.archive.org/web/20110202142239/http://bercianosdelparamo.com/

Bercianos del Páramo (Spanish pronunciation: [beɾˈθjanos ðel ˈpaɾamo], Leonese: Bercianos del Páramu) is a municipality located in the province of León, Castile and León, Spain. According to the 2010 census (INE), the municipality has a population of 713 inhabitants.
