= Gusendos de los Oteros =

Gusendos de los Oteros, Spain
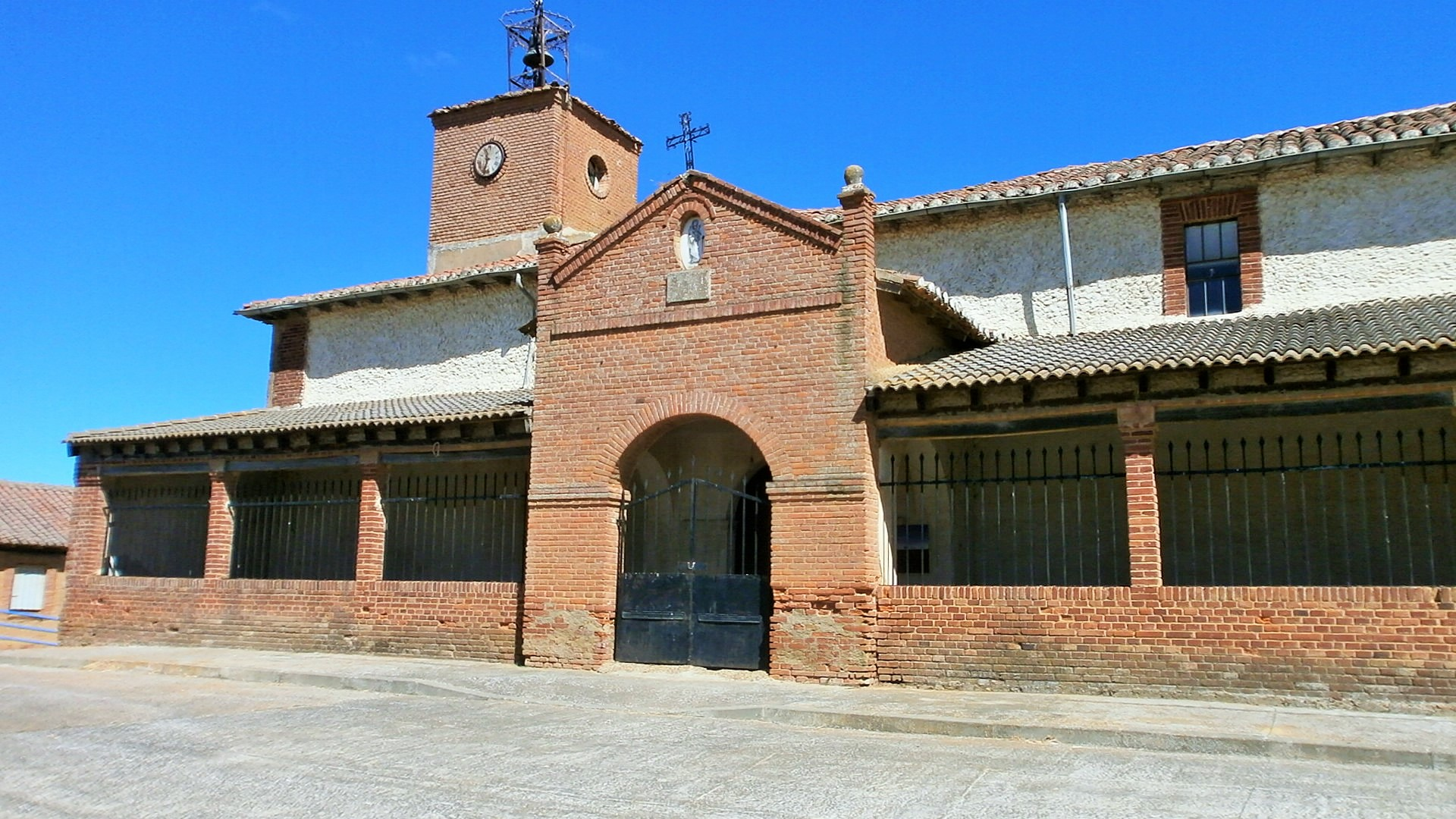
- Church in Gusendo de los Oteros

- Coat of arms

- Location within Spain
- Coordinates: 42°22′40″N 5°25′47″W
- Country: Spain
- Autonomous community: Castile and León
- Province: León
- Municipality: Gusendos de los Oteros

Government
  - Mayor: Juan Carlos Melón Melón (PP)

Area
  - Total: 24.68 km^{2} (9.53 sq mi)
- Elevation: 798 m (2,618 ft)

Population (2025-01-01)
  - Total: 123
  - Density: 4.98/km^{2} (12.9/sq mi)
- Demonym(s): gusendino, gusendina
- Time zone: UTC+1 (CET)
  - Summer (DST): UTC+2 (CEST)
- Postal Code: 24209
- Telephone prefix: 987
- Website: Ayto. de Gusendos de los Oteros

Gusendos de los Oteros (Spanish pronunciation: [ɡuˈsendos ðe los oˈteɾos]) is a municipality located in the province of León, Castile and León, Spain. According to the 2010 census (INE), the municipality had a population of 139 inhabitants.
