= Villaselán =

Coordinates: 42°32′N 4°57′W

Villaselán, Spain
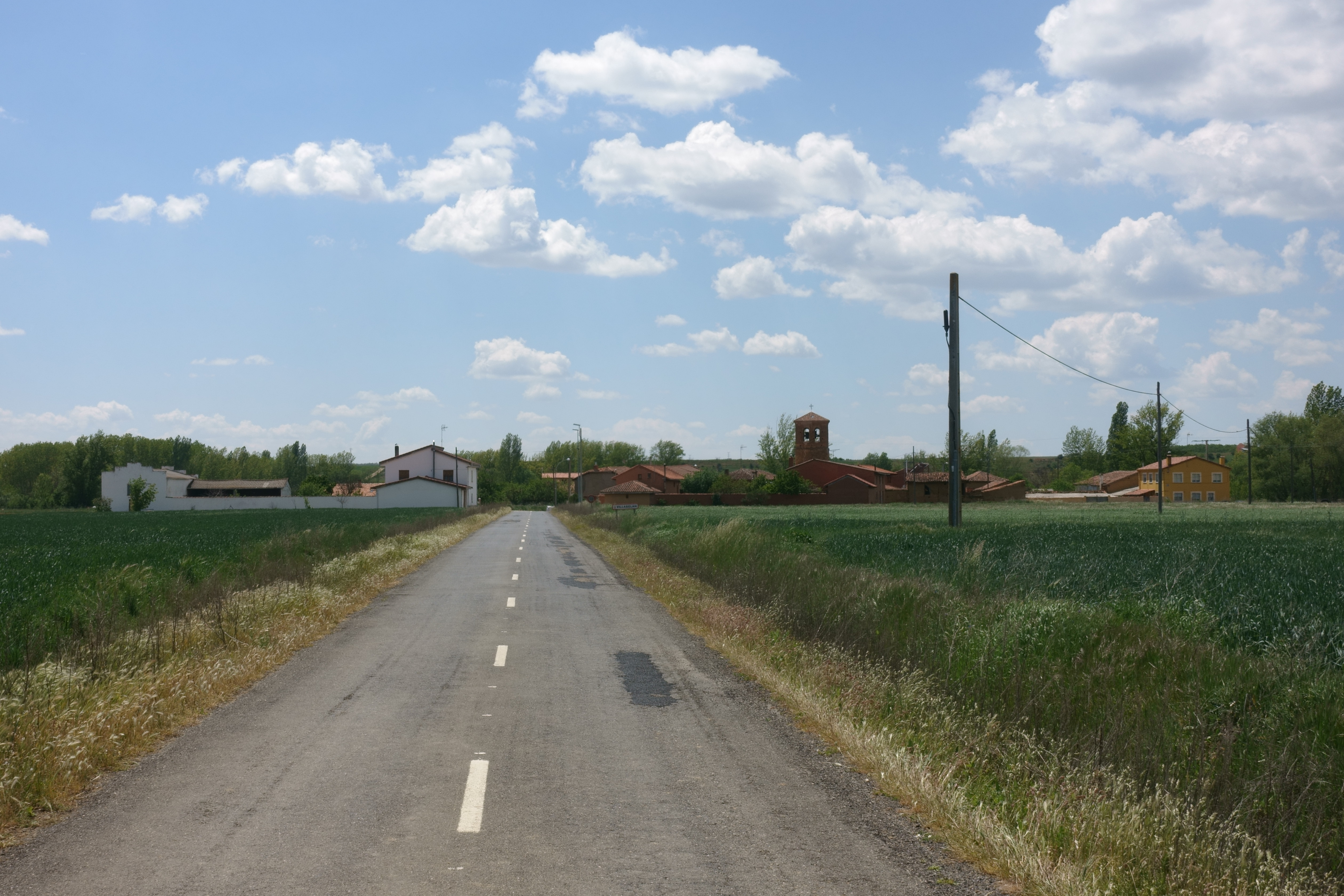
- View of the entrance to Villaselán, León, Spain
- Interactive map of Villaselán, Spain
- Country: Spain
- Autonomous community: Castile and León
- Province: León
- Municipality: Villaselán

Area
  - Total: 56.52 km^{2} (21.82 sq mi)
- Elevation: 862 m (2,828 ft)

Population (2025-01-01)
  - Total: 180
  - Density: 3.2/km^{2} (8.2/sq mi)
- Time zone: UTC+1 (CET)
  - Summer (DST): UTC+2 (CEST)

Villaselán is a municipality located in the province of León, Castile and León, Spain. According to the 2004 census (INE), the municipality had a population of 270 inhabitants.
