= San Adrián del Valle =

Coordinates: 42°08′N 5°44′W

San Adrián del Valle, Spain
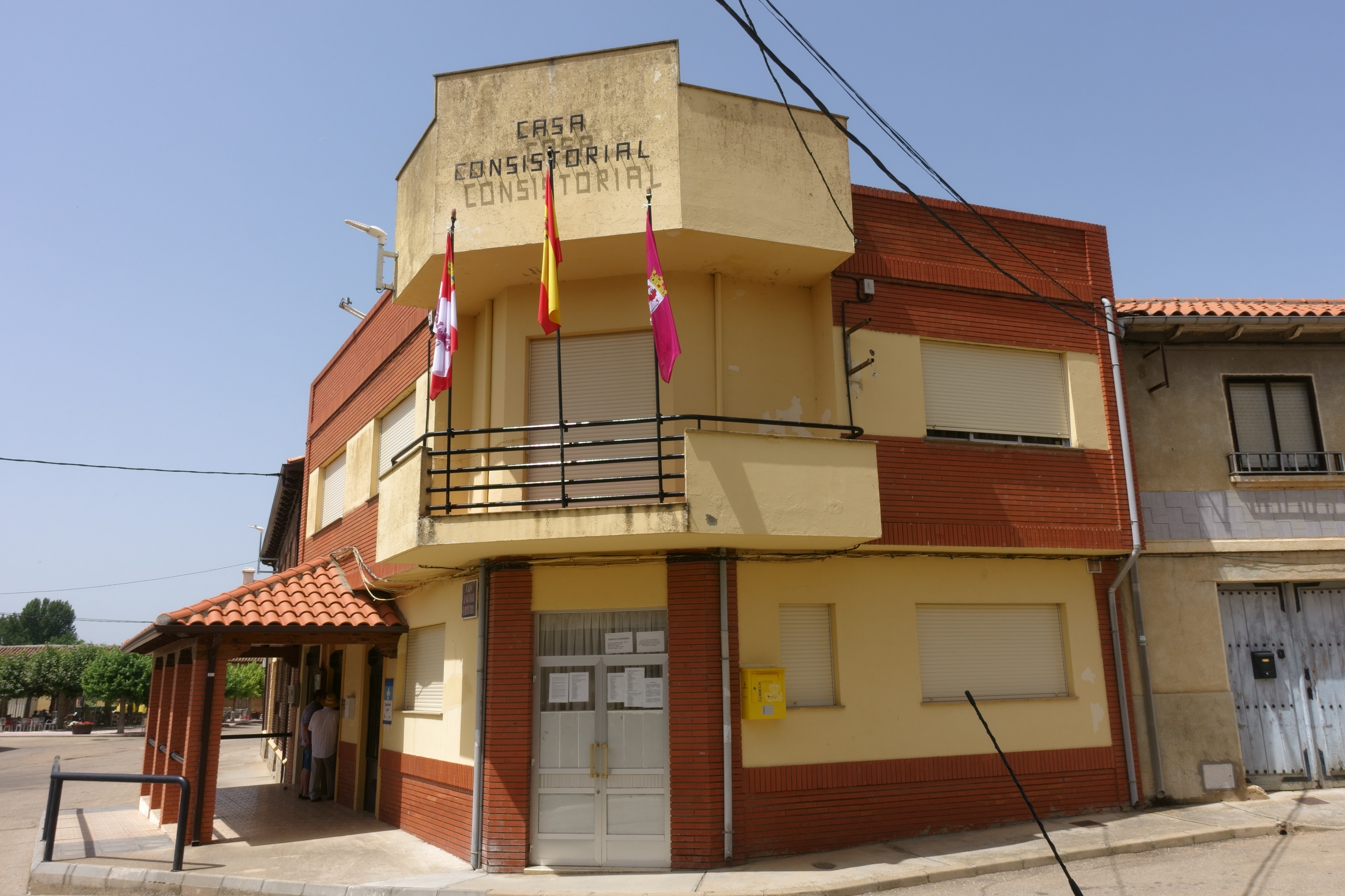
- Town hall of San Adrián del Valle

- Flag Coat of arms
- Interactive map of San Adrián del Valle, Spain
- Country: Spain
- Autonomous community: Castile and León
- Province: León
- Municipality: San Adrián del Valle

Area
  - Total: 15 km^{2} (5.8 sq mi)

Population (2025-01-01)
  - Total: 82
  - Density: 5.5/km^{2} (14/sq mi)
- Time zone: UTC+1 (CET)
  - Summer (DST): UTC+2 (CEST)

San Adrián del Valle is a municipality located in the province of León, Castile and León, Spain. According to the 2004 census (INE), the municipality has a population of 135.
