= Santas Martas =

Coordinates: 42°26′N 5°22′W

Santas Martas, Spain
- municipality
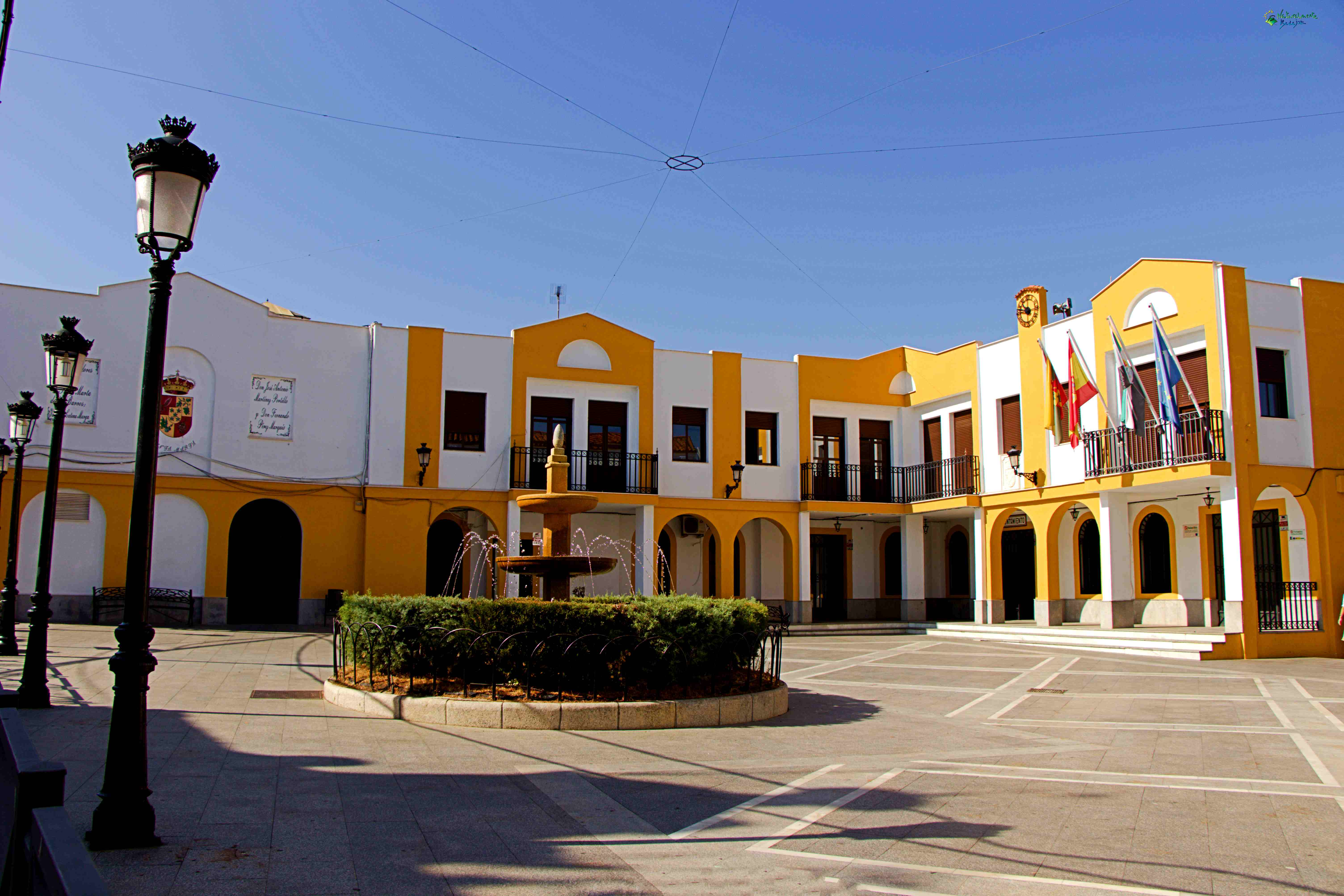
- Town hall

- Flag Coat of arms
- Interactive map of Santas Martas, Spain
- Country: Spain
- Autonomous community: Castile and León
- Province: León
- Municipality: Santas Martas

Area
  - Total: 118 km^{2} (46 sq mi)

Population (2025-01-01)
  - Total: 763
  - Density: 6.47/km^{2} (16.7/sq mi)
- Time zone: UTC+1 (CET)
  - Summer (DST): UTC+2 (CEST)

Santas Martas is a municipality located in the province of León, Castile and León, Spain. According to the 2004 census (INE), the municipality has a population of 952 inhabitants.
