= Villanueva de las Manzanas =

Coordinates: 42°28′N 5°29′W

- municipality
- Interactive map of Villanueva de las Manzanas
- Country: Spain
- Autonomous community: Castile and León
- Province: León
- Municipality: Villanueva de las Manzanas

Area
  - Total: 31.89 km^{2} (12.31 sq mi)
- Elevation: 779 m (2,556 ft)

Population (2025-01-01)
  - Total: 484
  - Density: 15.2/km^{2} (39.3/sq mi)
- Time zone: UTC+1 (CET)
  - Summer (DST): UTC+2 (CEST)

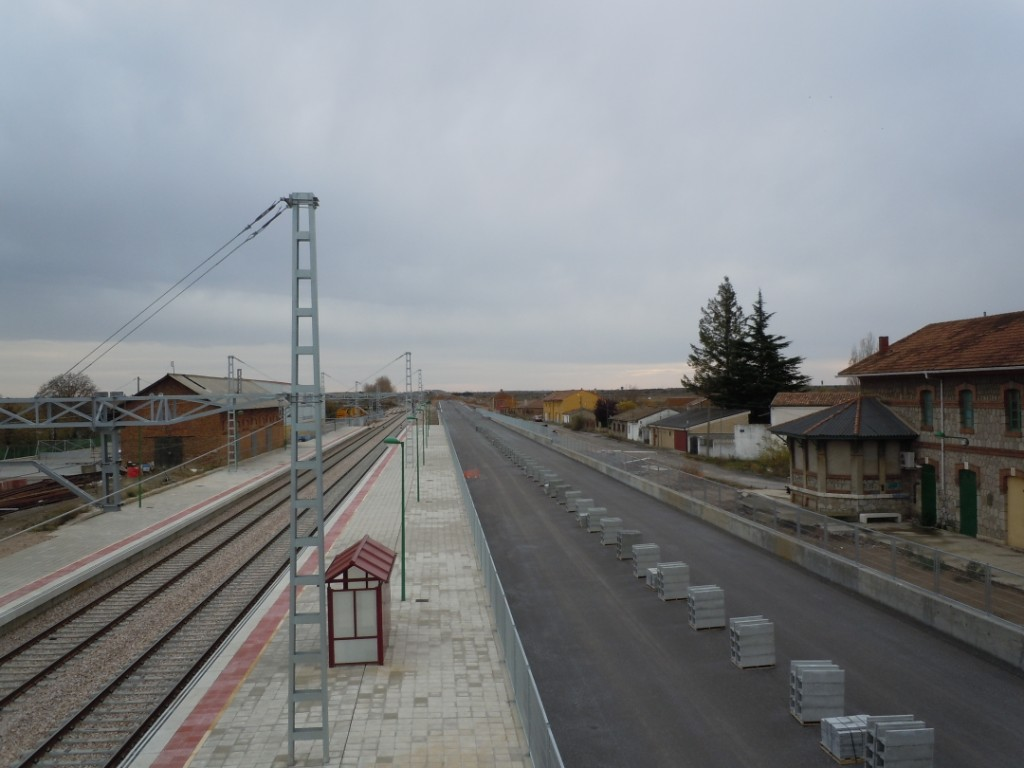
Villanueva de las Manzanas

Villanueva de las Manzanas is a municipality located in the province of León, Castile and León, Spain. According to the 2004 census (INE), the municipality had a population of 558 inhabitants.
