= Villamoratiel de las Matas =

Coordinates: 42°24′N 5°18′W

- municipality
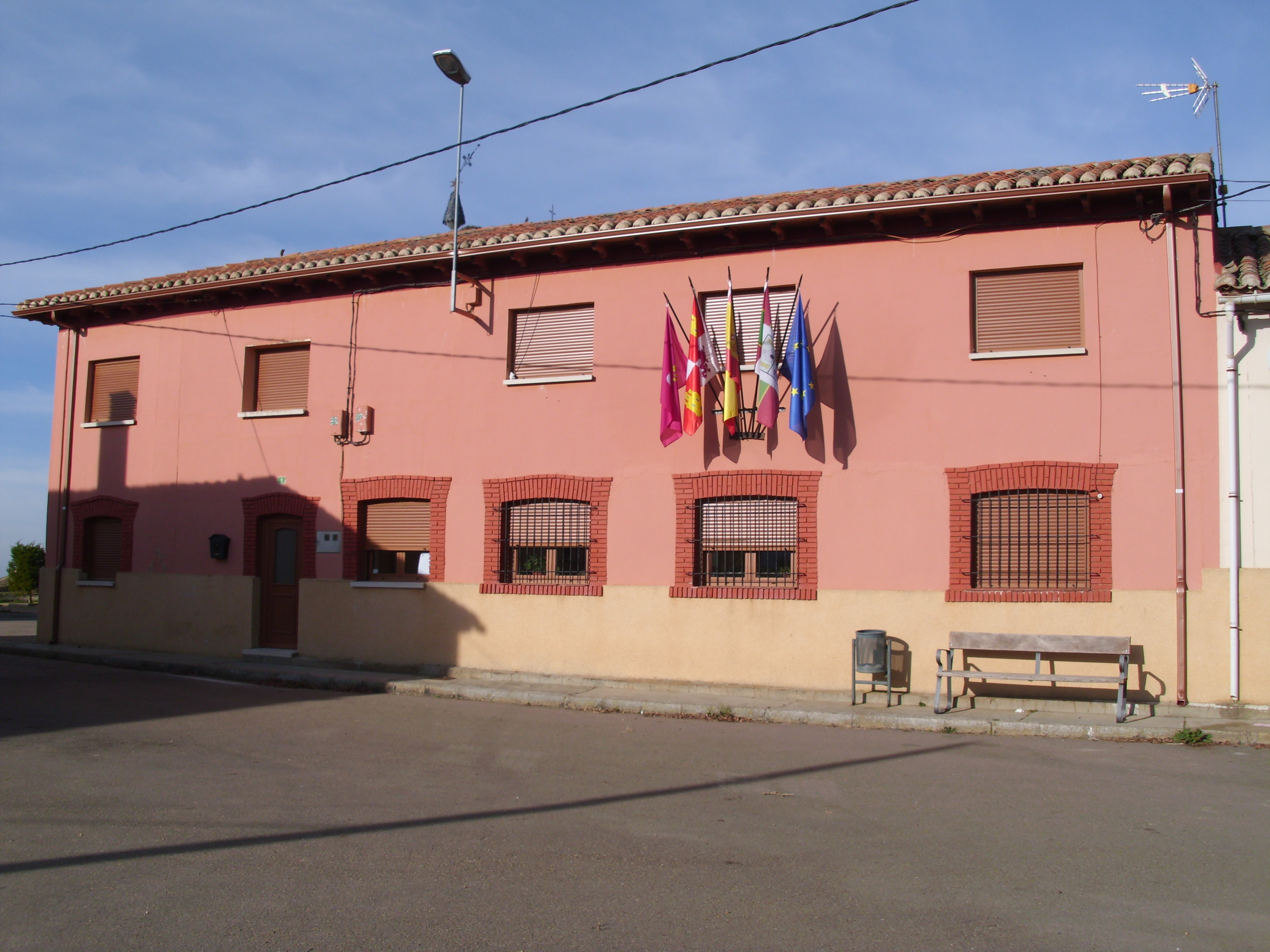
- Villamoratiel de las Matas Town Hall

- Flag Coat of arms
- Interactive map of Villamoratiel de las Matas
- Country: Spain
- Autonomous community: Castile and León
- Province: León
- Municipality: Villamoratiel de las Matas

Area
  - Total: 37.23 km^{2} (14.37 sq mi)
- Elevation: 847 m (2,779 ft)

Population (2025-01-01)
  - Total: 121
  - Density: 3.25/km^{2} (8.42/sq mi)
- Time zone: UTC+1 (CET)
  - Summer (DST): UTC+2 (CEST)
- Website: Villamoratiel de las Matas City Council (in Spanish)

Villamoratiel de las Matas is a municipality located in the province of León, Castile and León, Spain. According to the 2004 census (INE), the municipality had a population of 181 inhabitants.
