= Prado de la Guzpeña =

Coordinates: 42°47′N 5°02′W

Prado de la Guzpeña, Spain
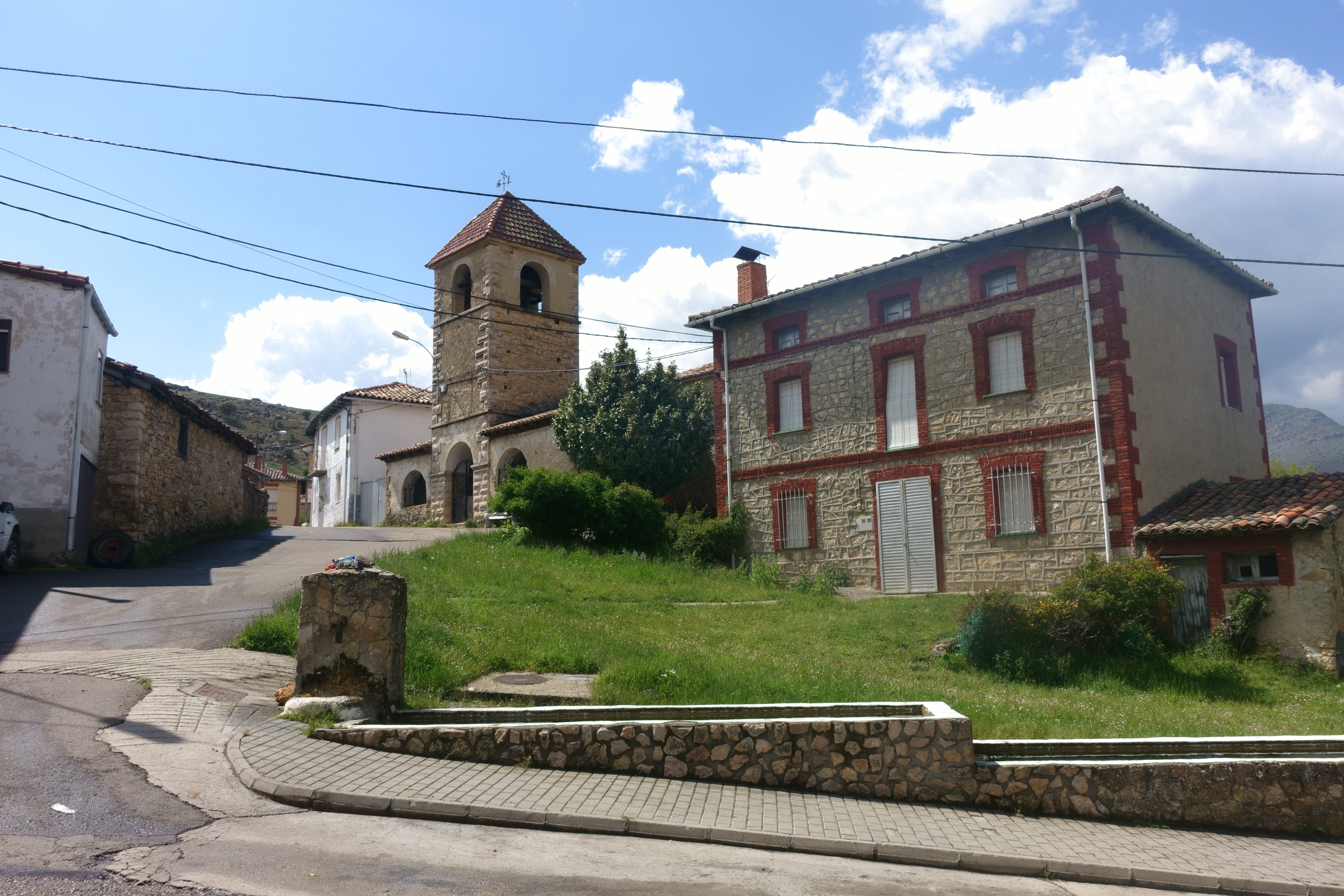
- Street of Prado de la Guzpeña
- Interactive map of Prado de la Guzpeña, Spain
- Country: Spain
- Autonomous community: Castile and León
- Province: León
- Municipality: Prado de la Guzpeña

Area
  - Total: 22 km^{2} (8.5 sq mi)

Population (2025-01-01)
  - Total: 108
  - Density: 4.9/km^{2} (13/sq mi)
- Time zone: UTC+1 (CET)
  - Summer (DST): UTC+2 (CEST)

Prado de la Guzpeña is a municipality located in the province of León, Castile and León, Spain. According to the 2004 census (INE), the municipality has a population of 138 inhabitants.
