= Laguna Dalga =

Laguna Dalga, Spain
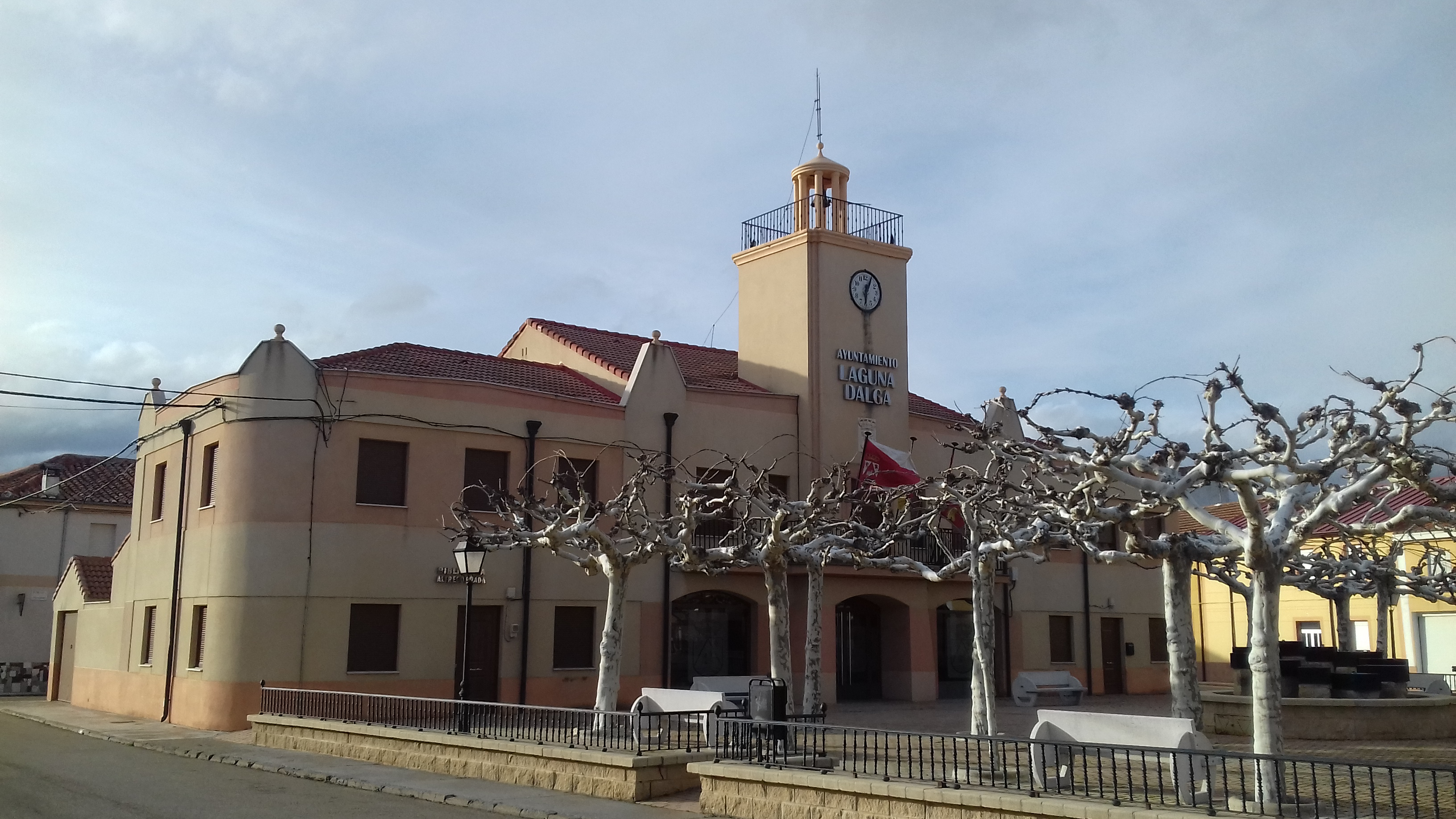
- Town hall

- Flag Coat of arms

- Location within Spain
- Coordinates: 42°19′55″N 5°45′1″W
- Country: Spain
- Autonomous community: Castile and León
- Province: León
- Municipality: Laguna Dalga

Government
  - Mayor: Eloy Báilez Lobato (PP)

Area
  - Total: 38.41 km^{2} (14.83 sq mi)
- Elevation: 799 m (2,621 ft)

Population (2025-01-01)
  - Total: 608
  - Density: 15.8/km^{2} (41.0/sq mi)
- Time zone: UTC+1 (CET)
  - Summer (DST): UTC+2 (CEST)
- Postal Code: 24248
- Telephone prefix: 987
- Website: Ayto. de Laguna Dalga

Laguna Dalga (Spanish pronunciation: [laˈɣuna ˈðalɣa]) is a municipality located in the province of León, Castile and León, Spain. According to the 2010 census (INE), the municipality had a population of 741 inhabitants.
