= Villaornate y Castro =

Coordinates: 42°11′08″N 5°32′51″W

- municipality
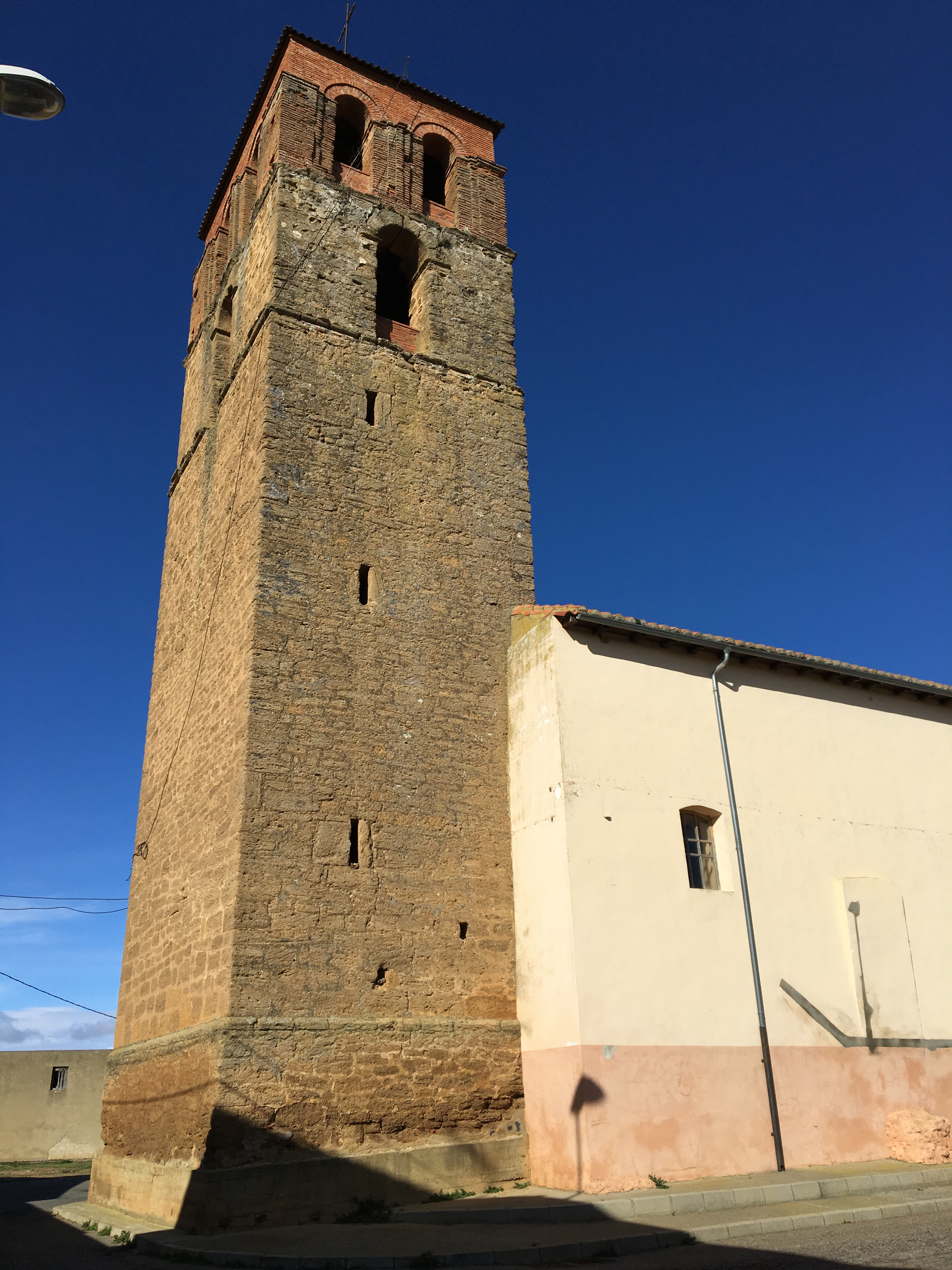
- Church of Santa María Magdalena in Villaornate

- Flag Coat of arms
- Interactive map of Villaornate y Castro
- Country: Spain
- Autonomous community: Castile and León
- Province: León
- Municipality: Villaornate y Castro

Area
  - Total: 48.24 km^{2} (18.63 sq mi)
- Elevation: 735 m (2,411 ft)

Population (2025-01-01)
  - Total: 348
  - Density: 7.21/km^{2} (18.7/sq mi)
- Time zone: UTC+1 (CET)
  - Summer (DST): UTC+2 (CEST)

Villaornate y Castro is a municipality located in the province of León, Castile and León, Spain. According to the 2004 census (INE), the municipality had a population of 472 inhabitants.
