= Vegas del Condado =

Coordinates: 42.6833°N 5.36556°W

- municipality
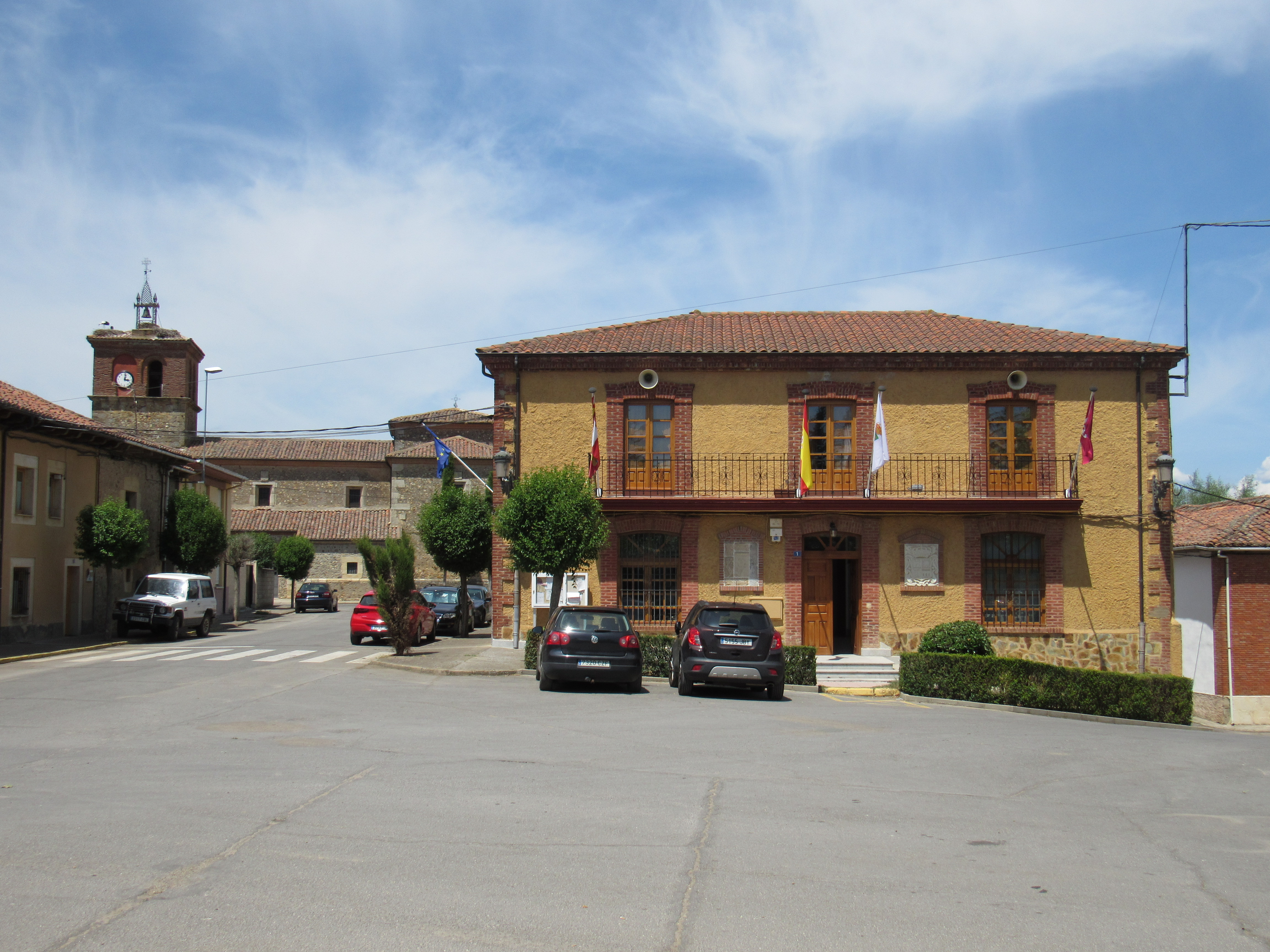
- Town hall of Vegas del Condado

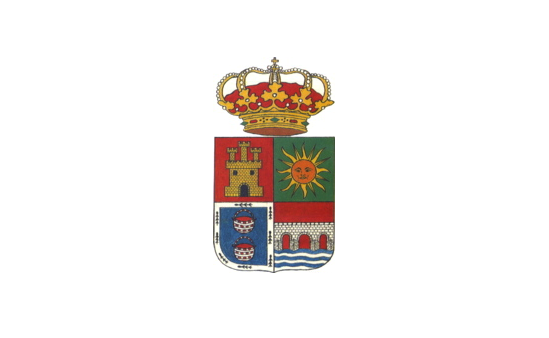
- Flag Coat of arms
- Interactive map of Vegas del Condado
- Country: Spain
- Autonomous community: Castile and León
- Province: León
- Municipality: Vegas del Condado

Area
  - Total: 122 km^{2} (47 sq mi)

Population (2025-01-01)
  - Total: 1,165
  - Density: 9.55/km^{2} (24.7/sq mi)
- Time zone: UTC+1 (CET)
  - Summer (DST): UTC+2 (CEST)

Vegas del Condado, Veigas del Condáu, in Leonese language, is a municipality located in the province of León, Castile and León, Spain. According to the 2025 census (INE), the municipality has a population of 1,165 inhabitants.

== See also ==
- Leonese language
- Kingdom of León
