= Zotes del Páramo =

Coordinates: 42°16′N 5°44′W

Zotes del Páramo, Spain
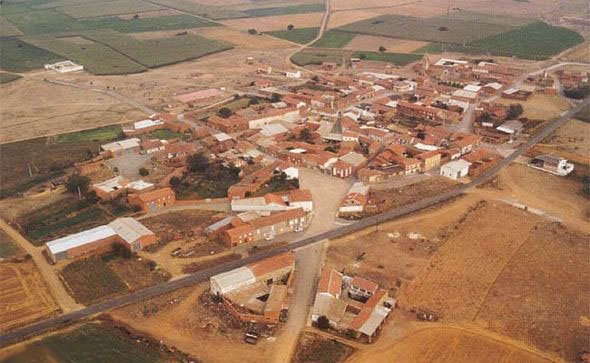
- Interactive map of Zotes del Páramo, Spain
- Country: Spain
- Autonomous community: Castile and León
- Province: León
- Municipality: Zotes del Páramo

Area
  - Total: 53.94 km^{2} (20.83 sq mi)
- Elevation: 780 m (2,560 ft)

Population (2025-01-01)
  - Total: 384
  - Density: 7.12/km^{2} (18.4/sq mi)
- Time zone: UTC+1 (CET)
  - Summer (DST): UTC+2 (CEST)

Zotes del Páramo is a municipality located in the province of León, Castile and León, Spain. According to the 2004 census (INE), the municipality had a population of 592 inhabitants.
