= Santa María de Ordás =

Coordinates: 42°43′N 5°49′W

Santa María de Ordás, Spain
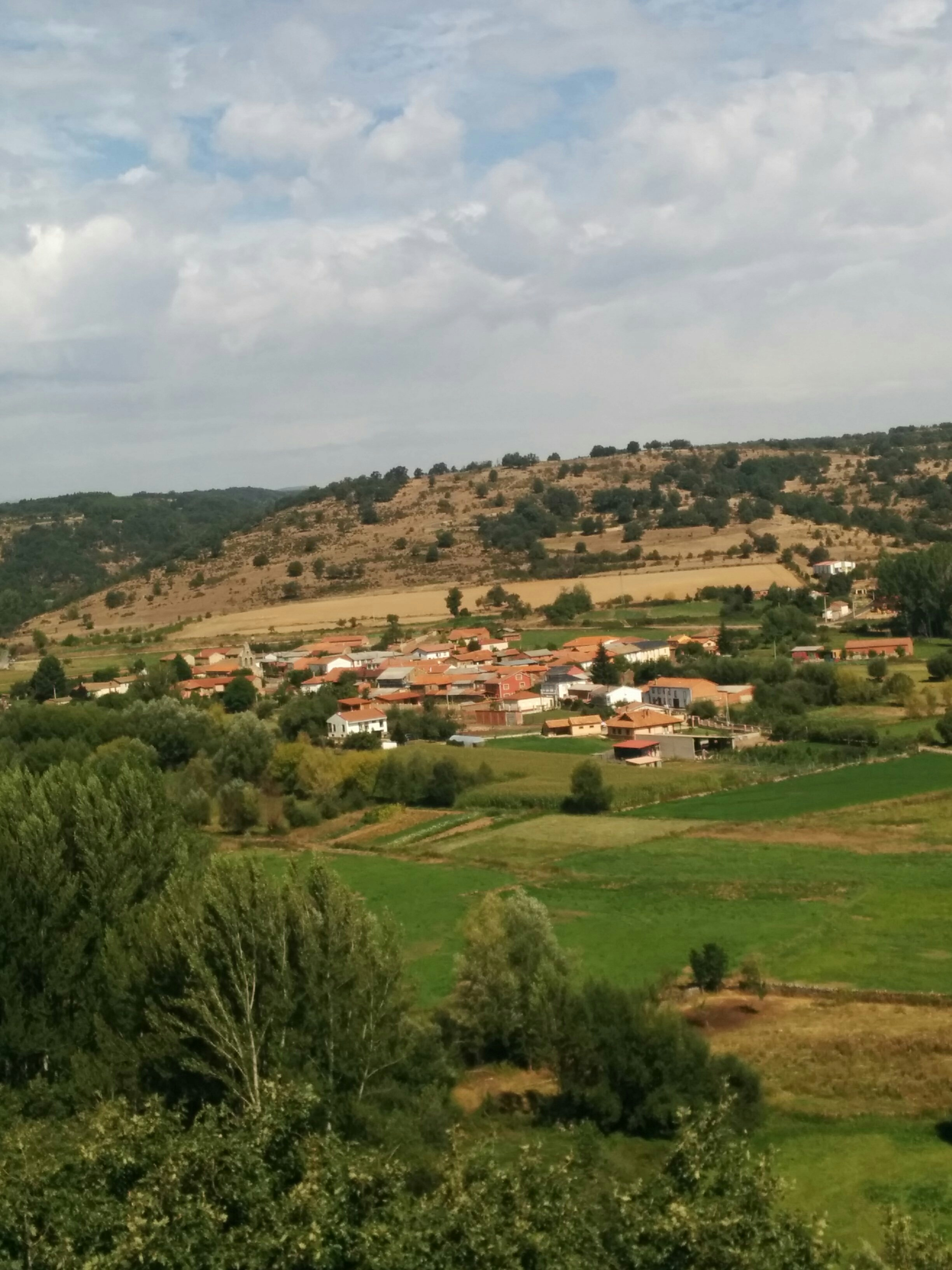
- View of Santa María de Ordás from the castle of Ordás

- Coat of arms
- Interactive map of Santa María de Ordás, Spain
- Country: Spain
- Autonomous community: Castile and León
- Province: León
- Municipality: Santa María de Ordás

Area
  - Total: 45 km^{2} (17 sq mi)

Population (2025-01-01)
  - Total: 327
  - Density: 7.3/km^{2} (19/sq mi)
- Time zone: UTC+1 (CET)
  - Summer (DST): UTC+2 (CEST)

Santa María de Ordás is a municipality located in the province of León, Castile and León, Spain. According to the 2004 census (INE), the municipality has a population of 372 inhabitants.
