= Oseja de Sajambre =

Coordinates: 43°08′N 5°02′W

- municipality
- Flag Coat of arms
- Interactive map of Oseja de Sajambre
- Country: Spain
- Autonomous community: Castile and León
- Province: León

Area
  - Total: 73 km^{2} (28 sq mi)

Population (2025-01-01)
  - Total: 214
  - Density: 2.9/km^{2} (7.6/sq mi)
- Time zone: UTC+1 (CET)
  - Summer (DST): UTC+2 (CEST)

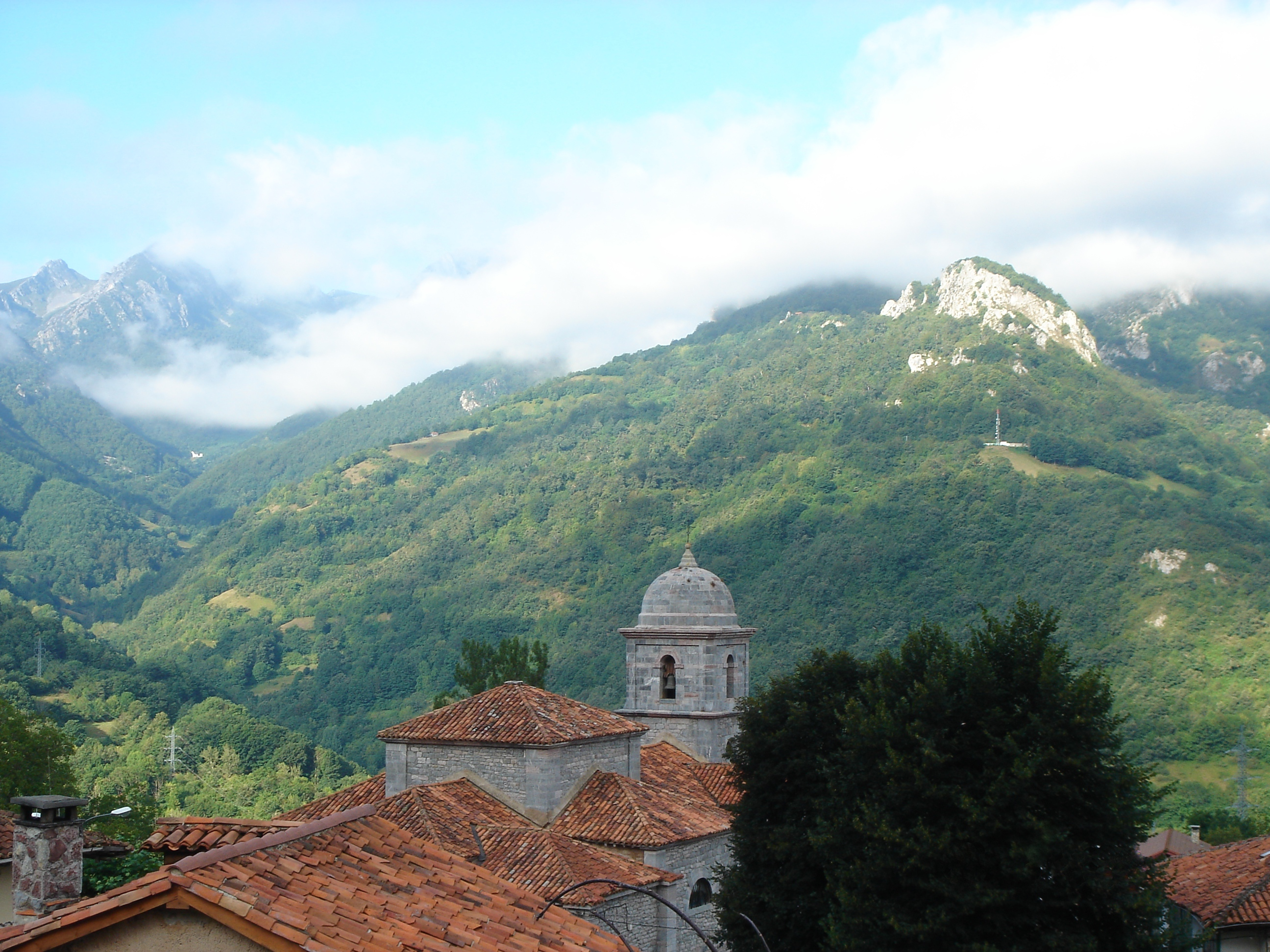

Oseja de Sajambre (Spanish pronunciation: [oˈsexa ðe saˈxambɾe]), is a municipality located in the province of León, Castile and León, Spain. According to the 2004 census (INE), the municipality has a population of 323 inhabitants.
