= Millaro de la Tercia =

- Minor local entity
- Millaró de la Tercia
- Location within Province of León Location within Castile and León Location within Spain
- Coordinates: 42°58′43″N 5°38′44″W
- Country: Spain
- Autonomous community: Castile and León
- Province: Province of León
- Municipality: Villamanín
- Elevation: 1,379 m (4,524 ft)

Population
  - Total: 13

Millaro de la Tercia or Millaró de la Tercia is a locality and minor local entity located in the municipality of Villamanín, in León province and the region of La Tercia del Camino, in the Autonomous Community of Castile and León, Spain. As of 2020, it has a population of 13.

It is located on the bed of Arroyo de Millaró, a tributary of the Bernesga.

The locality once belonged to the old Council of the Tercia del Camino.

== Geography ==
Millaro de la Tercia is located 54km north of León, Spain.

Millaro de la Tercia borders the Asturias to the north, Piedrafita and Piornedo to the northeast, Campo and Villanueva de Pontedo to the east, Carmenes to the southeast, Barrio de la Tercia to the south, Golpejar de la Tercia and Villanueva de la Tercia to the southwest, Camplongo de la Tercia to the west, and Tonín de Arbas to the northwest.
