= La Pola de Gordón =

Coordinates: 42°51′N 5°41′W

La Pola de Gordón, Spain
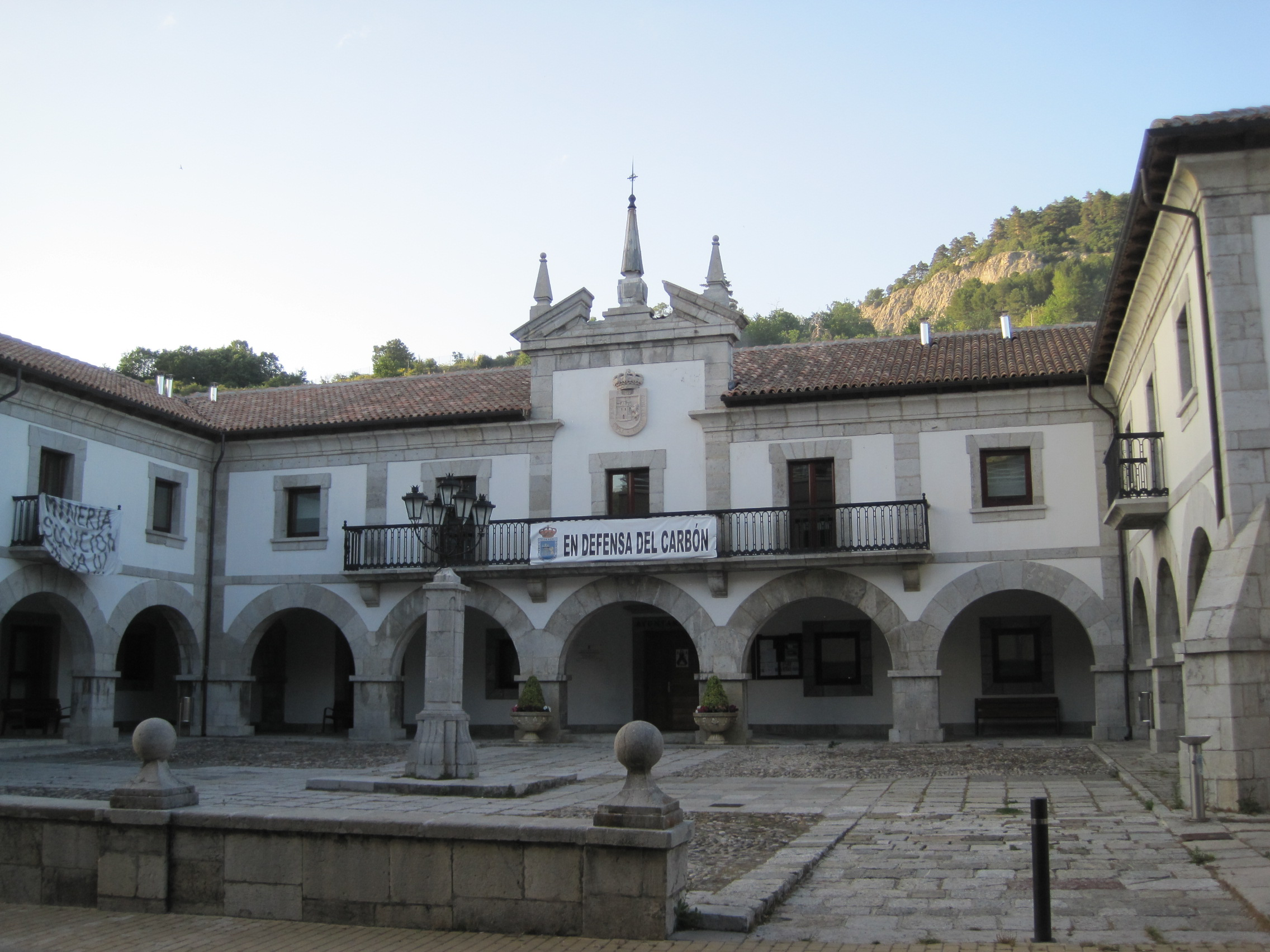
- Town hall of La Pola de Gordón

- Flag Coat of arms
- Interactive map of La Pola de Gordón, Spain
- Country: Spain
- Autonomous community: Castile and León
- Province: León
- Municipality: La Pola de Gordón

Area
  - Total: 157.64 km^{2} (60.87 sq mi)

Population (2025-01-01)
  - Total: 2,833
  - Density: 28.2/km^{2} (73/sq mi)
- Time zone: UTC+1 (CET)
  - Summer (DST): UTC+2 (CEST)
- Website: www.ayto-lapoladegordon.es

La Pola de Gordón is a municipality located in the province of León, Castile and León, Spain. According to the 2025 census (INE), the municipality has a population of 2833 inhabitants.

== Etymology ==
The toponym Gordón has a disputed origin. José Ramón Morala Rodríguez, professor at the University of León, proposes, based on the studies of Charles Rostaing, that place names with the root /kord-/ or /gord-/ (such as Gordón, Gordoncillo, Gordaliza, Gordoa, etc.) have a pre-Roman origin, probably related to an oronymic root alluding to a rise in the terrain. Furthermore, Morala connects this with the studies of Joan Coromines, which propose that certain place names with the root Gord- could have been formed by adding the Celtic or Gaulish element -dunum, meaning "village" or "fortress". Thus, names like "Gordón" could originally be interpreted as "village or strong castle", reinforcing the idea that these places were located in elevated and strategic areas, both for their defensive position and their geographical value.

Other possibilities include its relationship with gurdus (fat), and the possible connection with cordón (from chorda 'rope'). And from there, by extension, to the mountainous relief and the word "cordal" (mountain range), or the one proposed by Francisco Escobar from a root -K'R- and -G'R- with the meaning of "field, valley, or fertile land," are considered by researchers to be less linguistically viable hypotheses.

As for the toponym "pola," like the other polas in the Asturian-Leonese area, Ramón Menéndez Pidal attributed to it a Latin origin from the word "popula," analogous to "populus" ('village'), with that evolution "pobla" → "pola," perhaps because it was placed before the noun.

== Geography ==
La Pola de Gordón is located within the Gordón region, of which it is the capital, it lies 34 kilometers from León. The municipality is crossed by the N-630 national highway, between kilometer markers 102 and 116, by the LE-473 provincial road, which connects to Sena de Luna, and by a local road that provides access to Vegacervera.

The terrain of the municipality is rugged due to its location within the Cantabrian Mountains. The Bernesga River flows from north to south, before reaching La Robla, receiving tributaries such as the Casares River along its course. The altitude ranges from 1,914 meters in the southwest (El Pedroso) to 970 meters on the banks of the Bernesga before it leaves the municipality to the south. The municipal capital sits at 1,007 meters above sea level. It boasts several emblematic peaks, such as El Altico, El Cueto San Mateo, and the most well-known, Fontañán.

Its entire territory is integrated into the Alto Bernesga biosphere reserve, listed by UNESCO.

== Transport ==
=== Roads ===
The Gordón region's main artery is the N-630, which, via the Pajares Pass, connects Asturias with León and the rest of Spain. This makes it a heavily trafficked road year-round. Most of the towns and the municipality's population are concentrated along this road, which follows the course of the Bernesga River and the railway line. Another important road is the LE-473, which connects La Pola de Gordón with the Luna region via the Aralla Pass. Also noteworthy is the LE-3513, which connects La Vid de Gordón with Vegacervera, linking the Bernesga and Torío valleys. Several villages are connected by secondary roads such as the LE-3501 (Buiza and Folledo de Gordón), the LE-3502 (Paradilla de Gordón), the LE-3510 (Los Barrios de Gordón), the LE-3511 (Llombera de Gordón) or the LE-4512 (Nocedo de Gordón).

Type	Identifier	Denomination	Itinerary
National	N-630	Road Ruta de la Plata	Gijón - Sevilla
Provincial	LE-473	Aralla's road	La Pola de Gordón - San Pedro de Luna
Local	LE-3501	Folledo's road	Beberino - Folledo de Gordón
Local	LE-3502	Paradilla's road	LE-473 - Paradilla de Gordón
Local	LE-3510	Los Barrios' road	La Pola de Gordón - Los Barrios de Gordón
Local	LE-3511	Llombera's road	Huergas de Gordón - Llombera de Gordón
Local	LE-3513	La Vid's road	Vegacervera - La Vid
Local	LE-4512	Nocedo's road	N-630 - Nocedo de Gordón

=== Rail ===
Since the arrival of the railway in Gordón in 1868, the León-Gijón line has been essential for the transport of goods and passengers. La Pola and Santa Lucía stations remain in service, although they only offer two daily passenger train services on Renfe Media Distancia Regional lines: one to Asturias in the mornings and the other to León and Valladolid in the afternoons.

=== Buses ===
Bus transport is provided by the company ALSA, which operates the line between León and Villamanín. This line has approximately ten daily departures and, following the N-630, makes stops in the villages of Peredilla, Nocedo, Huergas, La Pola, Vega, Santa Lucía, Ciñera, La Vid, and Villasimpliz.

== Localities ==
La Pola de Gordón has 17 localities:

- Los Barrios de Gordón
- Beberino
- Buiza
- Cabornera
- Ciñera
- Folledo
- Geras (León)
- Huergas de Gordón
- Llombera
- Nocedo de Gordón
- Paradilla de Gordón
- Peredilla
- La Pola de Gordón
- Santa Lucía de Gordón
- Vega de Gordón
- La Vid de Gordón
- Villasimpliz

== Public services ==
=== Education ===
The Gordón region has three schools: two primary schools (CEIP) and a secondary school (IESO). These schools are the CEIP Federico García Lorca in La Pola de Gordón (established in 1980), the CEIP San Miguel Arcángel in Ciñera de Gordón, and the IESO La Pola de Gordón, located in the town of the same name. Students completing ESO who wish to pursue Bachillerato (upper secondary education) can attend the IES Ramiro II in La Robla. This neighboring municipality also has a private vocational training center. For university studies, La Pola de Gordón is 30 kilometers from the University of León and 80 kilometers from the University of Oviedo, the main destinations for university students from the region.

=== Libraries ===
La Pola de Gordón has a strong tradition of promoting reading and cultural dissemination in rural areas. Since the 20th century, the municipality has had three municipal libraries located in its most populated villages: the "Antonio Gamoneda" Library (1987) in La Pola de Gordón, the "Miguel de Cervantes" Library (1970) in Santa Lucía, and the "Carlos Martínez Alonso" Library (1971) in Ciñera.

In 2025, the Town Council launched a project to bring reading to all the villages in the municipality by installing free libraries. These wooden structures, located in squares and public spaces, allow for the exchange of books based on the principle of "take a book, leave a book." Thanks to this initiative, all 17 villages in the municipality now have their own reading space, making La Pola de Gordón one of the few rural municipalities in Spain with public libraries in every village.

=== Sports facilities ===
The municipality of La Pola de Gordón has several municipal and regional sports facilities for sports, active leisure, and local sports schools.

In La Pola de Gordón, you'll find the La Estacada municipal pavilion, an indoor sports center with courts for handball, basketball, and futsal, used by sports schools and the general public, and the Fabián Tascón municipal sports complex, which features swimming pools, two tennis courts, a football field, a basketball court, a volleyball court, and ample green spaces with picnic tables. La Pola also has a padel court, a calisthenics park, and a pump track.

In Santa Lucía, there is the Antonio del Valle Menéndez municipal pavilion, an indoor facility with multi-sports courts and seating for approximately 400 people, where competitions, training sessions, and school activities take place. Next to it is the Santa Lucía municipal swimming pool. In Ciñera, the Santa Bárbara sports center stands out, a sports complex with a swimming pool, pelota court and football field, originally linked to the Hullera Vasco-Leonesa, along with the municipal bowling alley of Ciñera, intended for the practice of Leonese bowling.

=== Public health ===
The municipality of La Pola de Gordón has a Health Center, located in the Plaza Cardenal Aguirre in the municipal capital. It is part of the Castilla y León Health Service (Sacyl) and belongs to the León health area, forming, along with the municipalities of Villamanín and La Robla, the Bernesga River Basin basic health zone. The center provides primary care services, including family medicine, nursing, pediatrics, and urgent care. It also functions as a Urgent Care Point (PAC), offering out-of-hospital emergency coverage to the population of the municipality and nearby towns. Many of the villages have small clinics affiliated with the La Pola de Gordón Health Center. The municipality has three pharmacies located in La Pola, Santa Lucía, and Ciñera.
