= Buiza =

- Town
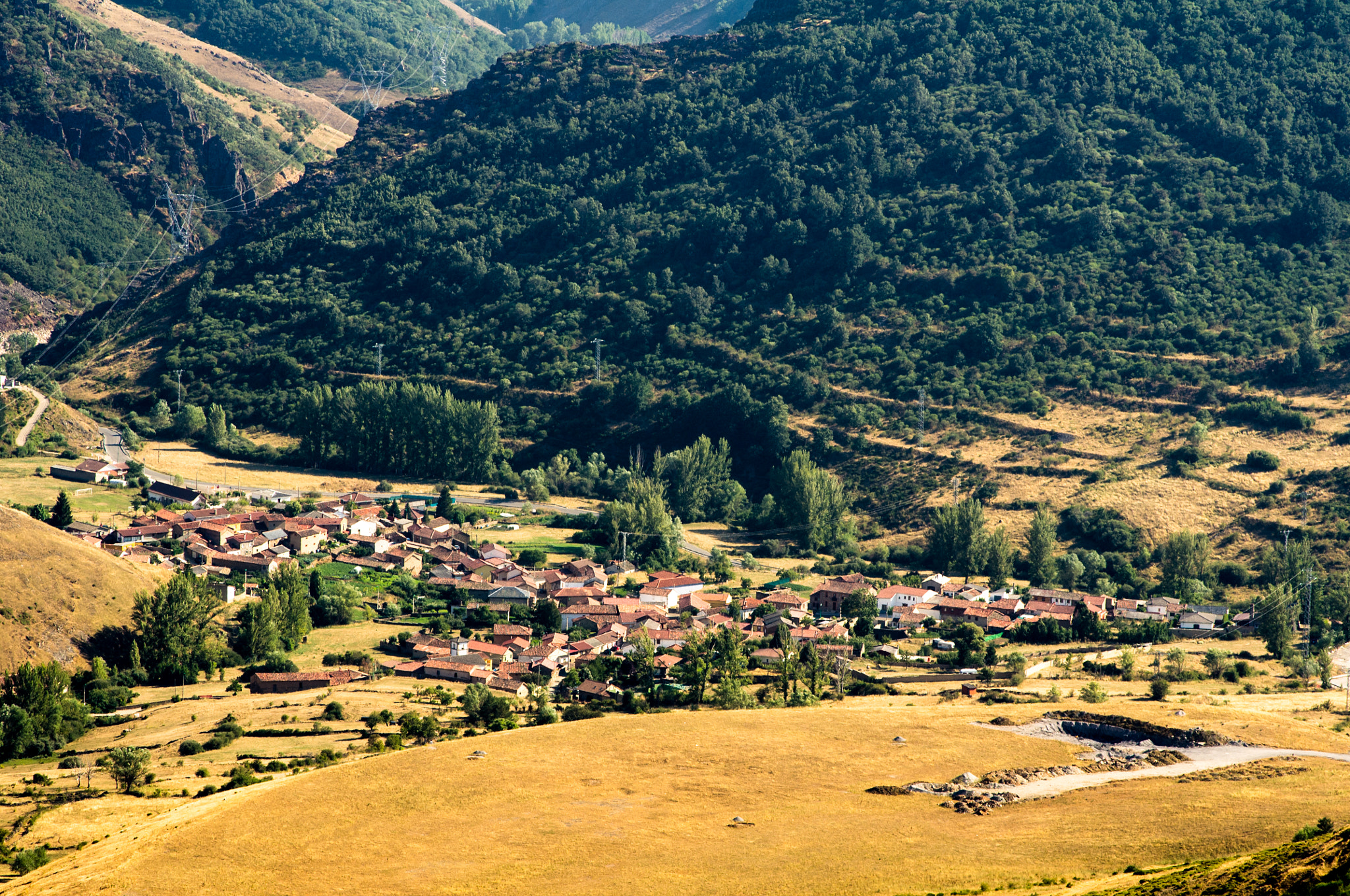
- Interactive map of Buiza
- Coordinates: 42.893611°N 5.686944°W
- Country: Spain
- Autonomous community: Castile and León
- Province: León
- Elevation: 1,130 m (3,710 ft)

Population (2020)
  - Total: 56

Buiza is a Spanish town in the municipality of La Pola de Gordón, in the Province of León and the region of Montaña Central, in the autonomous community of Castile and León.

== Background ==
One of the ancient routes of the Camino de Santiago passes through this town, which to this day has been forgotten, and which from Boñar deviated north towards Ranedo de Curueño, to arrive via Correcillas and Villalfeide, to Vegacervera, Coladilla, Valle and Villar, going down the Faedo to Ciñera and La Vid, and once crossing the town of Buiza, it continued to Beberino and La Pola de Gordón, to join again at Otero de las Dueñas, towards Ponferrada.

Located on the Mongrande stream and the Villafreo stream, tributaries of the Folledo stream, and this in turn of the Casares river, a tributary of the Bernesga.

The lands of Buiza border with those of Rodiezmo de la Tercia, Ventosilla de la Tercia and Villamanín to the north, Villasimpliz to the northeast, La Vid de Gordón and Ciñera to the east, Santa Lucía de Gordón and Vega de Gordón to the southeast, Beberino to the south, Cabornera and Paradilla de Gordón to the southwest, Folledo to the west and Viadangos de la Tercia, Poladura de la Tercia and San Martín de la Tercia to the northwest.

It belonged to the old Concejo de Gordón.

== See also ==
- Ermita de Nuestra Señora del Valle
- Northern Way
