= Viadangos de Arbas =

- Minor local entity
- Viadangos de Arbás
- Location within Province of León Location within Castile and León Location within Spain
- Coordinates: 42°57′7″N 5°44′42″W
- Country: Spain
- Autonomous community: Castile and León
- Province: Province of León
- Municipality: Villamanín
- Elevation: 1,292 m (4,239 ft)

Population
  - Total: 28

Viadangos de Arbas or Viadangos de Arbás is a locality and minor local entity located in the municipality of Villamanín, in León province, Castile and León, Spain. As of 2020, it has a population of 28.

== Geography ==
Viadangos de Arbas is located 79 km north-northwest of León.

The lands of Viadangos de Arbas border with those of Arbas del Puerto to the north, Busdongo and Camplongo de Arbas to the northeast and Villanueva de la Tercia and Golpejar de la Tercia to the east, Buiza, San Martín de la Tercia and Poladura de la Tercia to the southeast, Alceo, Folledo, Paradilla de Gordón and Geras to the south, Cubillas de Arbas and Casares de Arbas to the southwest and Caldas de Luna and Robledo de Caldas to the west.
