= Montealegre, León =

Montealegre
- Minor local entity
- Location within Province of León Location within Castile and León Location within Spain
- Coordinates: 42°35′30″N 6°16′20″W
- Country: Spain
- Autonomous community: Castile and León
- Province: Province of León
- Municipality: Villagatón
- Elevation: 1,006 m (3,301 ft)

Population
  - Total: 67

Montealegre is a locality and minor local entity located in the municipality of Villagatón, in León province, Castile and León, Spain. As of 2020, it has a population of 67.

== Geography ==
Montealegre is located 79km west of León, Spain.
