= Palaciosmil =

- Minor local entity
- Location within Province of León Location within Castile and León Location within Spain
- Coordinates: 42°39′54″N 6°3′44″W
- Country: Spain
- Autonomous community: Castile and León
- Province: Province of León
- Municipality: Quintana del Castillo
- Elevation: 1,028 m (3,373 ft)

Population
  - Total: 25

Palaciosmil is a locality and minor local entity located in the municipality of Quintana del Castillo, in the León, Castile and León, Spain. As of 2020, it has a population of 25.

== Geography ==
Palaciosmil is located 48km west-northwest of León, Spain.
