= La Veguellina de Cepeda =

- Minor local entity
- La Veguellina
- Location within Province of León Location within Castile and León Location within Spain
- Coordinates: 42°38′29″N 6°1′9″W
- Country: Spain
- Autonomous community: Castile and León
- Province: Province of León
- Municipality: Quintana del Castillo
- Elevation: 973 m (3,192 ft)

Population
  - Total: 26

La Veguellina de Cepeda or La Veguellina is a locality and minor local entity located in the municipality of Quintana del Castillo, in the province of León, Castile and León, Spain. As of 2020, it has a population of 26.

== Geography ==
La Veguellina de Cepeda is located 46km west of León, Spain.
