= Ucedo =

- Minor local entity
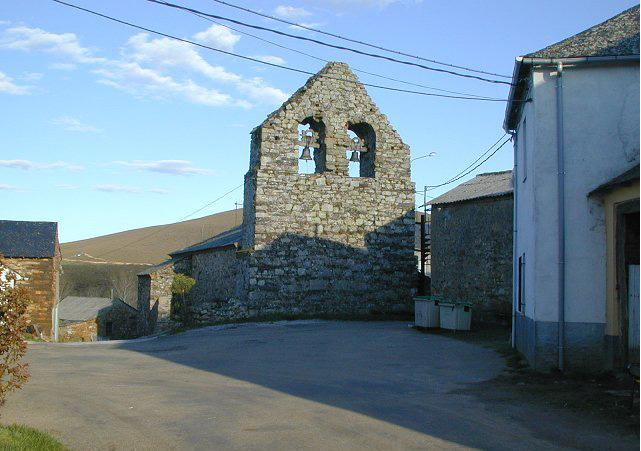

- Location within Province of León Location within Castile and León Location within Spain
- Coordinates: 42°35′17″N 6°11′40″W
- Country: Spain
- Autonomous community: Castile and León
- Province: Province of León
- Municipality: Villagatón
- Elevation: 1,145 m (3,757 ft)

Population
  - Total: 36

Ucedo is a locality and minor local entity located in the municipality of Villagatón, in León province, Castile and León, Spain.

== Demographics ==
As of 2020, it has a population of 36.

== Geography ==
Ucedo is located 75km west of León, Spain.
