= Abano, León =

Abano
- Minor local entity
- Location within Province of León Location within Castile and León Location within Spain
- Coordinates: 42°38′54″N 6°2′9″W
- Country: Spain
- Autonomous community: Castile and León
- Province: Province of León
- Municipality: Quintana del Castillo
- Elevation: 985 m (3,232 ft)

Population
  - Total: 23

Abano is a locality and minor local entity located in the municipality of Quintana del Castillo, in the province of León, Castile and León, Spain. As of 2020, it has a population of 23.

== Geography ==
Abano is located 47km west of León, Spain.
