= Villaobispo de las Regueras =

- Minor local entity
- Location within Province of León Location within Castile and León Location within Spain
- Coordinates: 42°36′51″N 5°32′36″W
- Country: Spain
- Autonomous community: Castile and León
- Province: Province of León
- Municipality: Villaquilambre
- Elevation: 832 m (2,730 ft)

Population
  - Total: 6,144

Villaobispo de las Regueras is a locality and minor local entity located in the municipality of Villaquilambre, in León province, Castile and León, Spain. As of 2020, it has a population of 6144.

== Geography ==
Villaobispo de las Regueras is located 6km northeast of León, Spain.
