= Villarrodrigo de las Regueras =

- Minor local entity
- Location within Province of León Location within Castile and León Location within Spain
- Coordinates: 42°38′5″N 5°32′3″W
- Country: Spain
- Autonomous community: Castile and León
- Province: Province of León
- Municipality: Villaquilambre
- Elevation: 843 m (2,766 ft)

Population
  - Total: 1,137

Villarrodrigo de las Regueras is a locality and minor local entity located in the municipality of Villaquilambre, in León province, Castile and León, Spain. As of 2020, it has a population of 1137.

== Geography ==
Villarrodrigo de las Regueras is located 9km north-northeast of León, Spain.
