= Castrillino =

- Minor local entity
- Location within Province of León Location within Castile and León Location within Spain
- Coordinates: 42°39′15″N 5°30′38″W
- Country: Spain
- Autonomous community: Castile and León
- Province: Province of León
- Municipality: Villaquilambre
- Elevation: 906 m (2,972 ft)

Population
  - Total: 17

Castrillino is a locality and minor local entity located in the municipality of Villaquilambre, in León province, Castile and León, Spain. As of 2020, it has a population of 17.

== Geography ==
Castrillino is located 12km northeast of León, Spain.
