= Fáfilas =

- Minor local entity
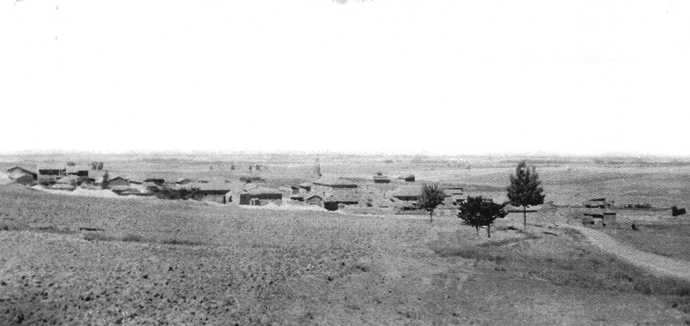

- Location within Province of León Location within Castile and León Location within Spain
- Coordinates: 42°15′13″N 5°28′1″W
- Country: Spain
- Autonomous community: Castile and León
- Province: Province of León
- Municipality: Villabraz
- Elevation: 820 m (2,690 ft)

Population
  - Total: 22

Fáfilas is a locality and minor local entity located in the municipality of Villabraz, in León province, Castile and León, Spain. As of 2020, it has a population of 22.

== Geography ==
Fáfilas is located 44km south-southeast of León, Spain.
