= Villamoros de las Regueras =

- Minor local entity
- Location within Province of León Location within Castile and León Location within Spain
- Coordinates: 42°37′16″N 5°32′7″W
- Country: Spain
- Autonomous community: Castile and León
- Province: Province of León
- Municipality: Villaquilambre
- Elevation: 836 m (2,743 ft)

Population
  - Total: 221

Villamoros de las Regueras is a locality and minor local entity located in the municipality of Villaquilambre, in León province, Castile and León, Spain. As of 2020, it has a population of 221.

== Geography ==
Villamoros de las Regueras is located 7km northeast of León, Spain.
