= Alcuetas =

- Minor local entity
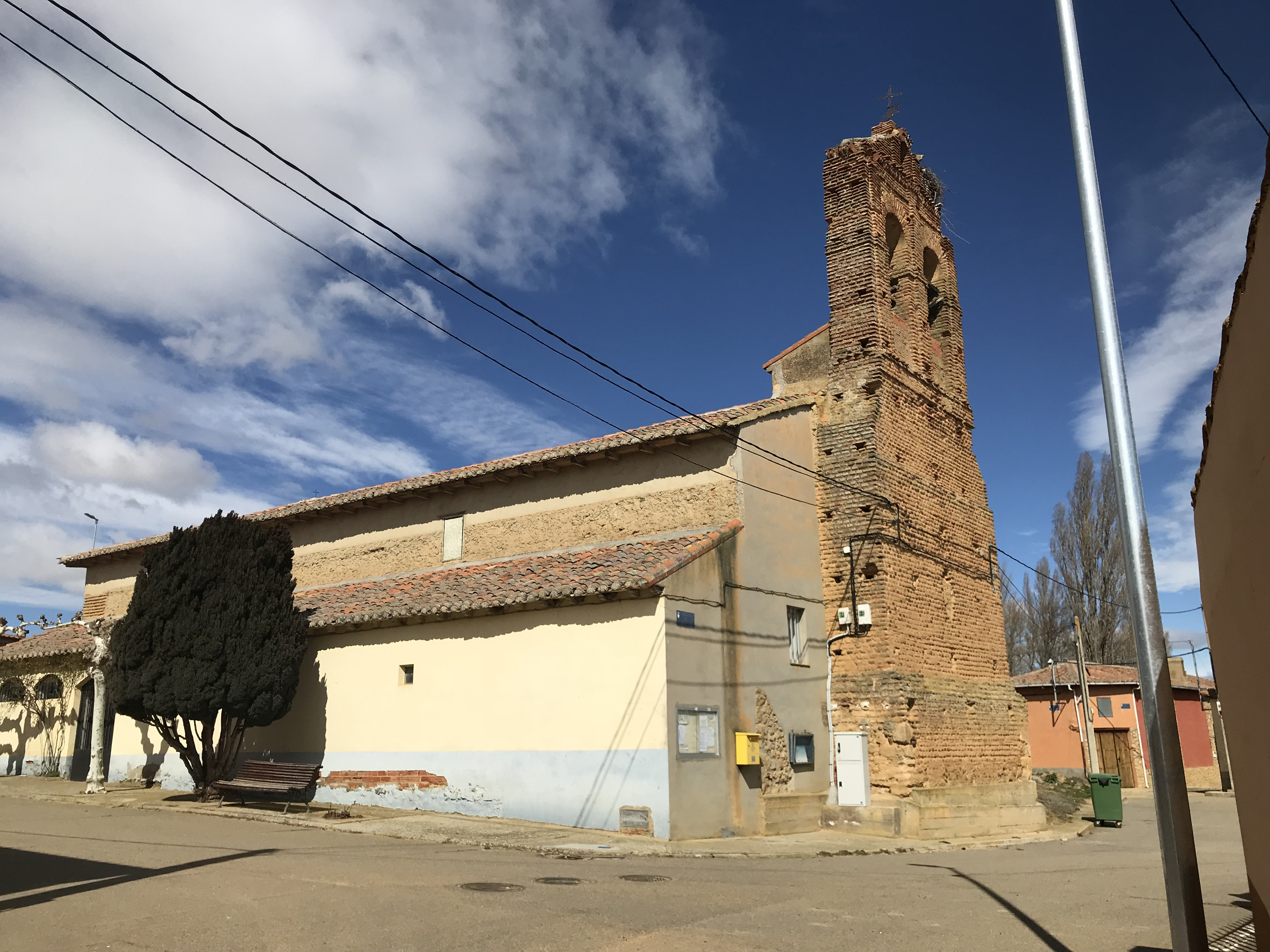

- Location within Province of León Location within Castile and León Location within Spain
- Coordinates: 42°16′14″N 5°26′2″W
- Country: Spain
- Autonomous community: Castile and León
- Province: Province of León
- Municipality: Villabraz
- Elevation: 839 m (2,753 ft)

Population
  - Total: 26

Alcuetas is a locality and minor local entity located in the municipality of Villabraz, in León province, Castile and León, Spain. As of 2020, it has a population of 26.

== Geography ==
Alcuetas is located 45 km south-southeast of León, Spain.
