= La Silva =

- Minor local entity
- Location within Province of León Location within Castile and León Location within Spain
- Coordinates: 42°36′9″N 6°15′53″W
- Country: Spain
- Autonomous community: Castile and León
- Province: Province of León
- Municipality: Villagatón
- Elevation: 881 m (2,890 ft)

Population
  - Total: 42

La Silva is a locality and minor local entity located in the municipality of Villagatón, in León province, Castile and León, Spain. As of 2020, it has a population of 42.

== Geography ==
La Silva is located 80km west of León, Spain.
