= San Martín de la Tercia =

- Minor local entity
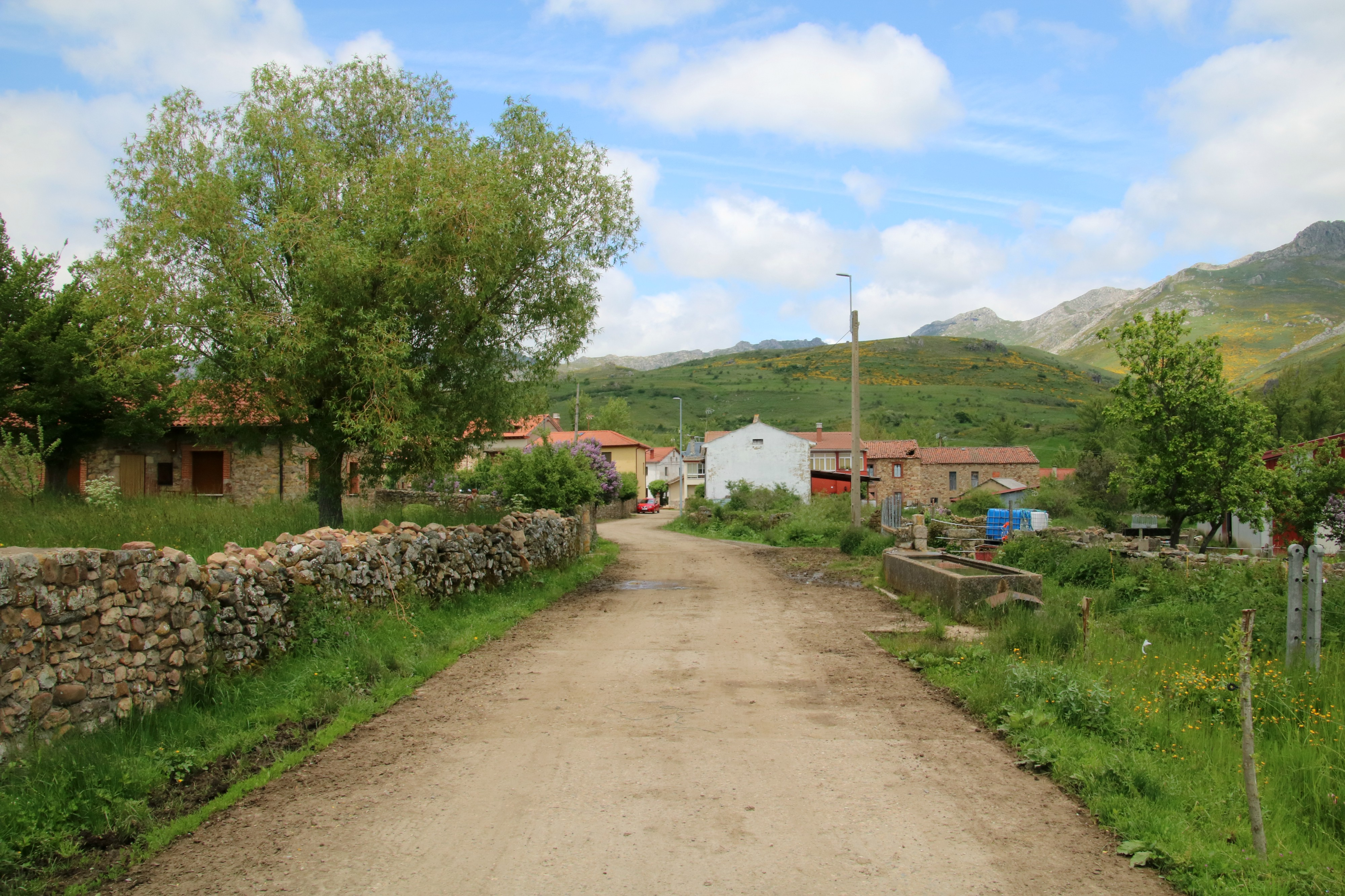

- Location within Province of León Location within Castile and León Location within Spain
- Coordinates: 42°56′44″N 5°42′48″W
- Country: Spain
- Autonomous community: Castile and León
- Province: Province of León
- Municipality: Villamanín
- Elevation: 1,204 m (3,950 ft)

Population
  - Total: 26

San Martín de la Tercia is a locality and minor local entity located in the municipality of Villamanín, in León province, Castile and León, Spain. As of 2020, it has a population of 26.

== Geography ==
San Martín de la Tercia is located 80km north-northwest of León, Spain.

The lands of San Martín de la Tercia border with those of Busdongo to the north, Camplongo de la Tercia and Villanueva de la Tercia to the northeast, Rodiezmo de la Tercia to the east, Cármenes to the southeast, Villasimpliz, Buiza and Folledo to the south, Geras and Aralla de Luna to the southwest, Poladura de la Tercia to the west, and Viadangos de Arbas and Arbas del Puerto to the northwest.

== Personalities ==
José Luis García Fierro (1948-2020), Researcher Professor at the Spanish National Research Council (CSIC), was born in San Martín de Tercia. Prof. Fierro received the "Miguel Catalán" award from the Regional Government of Madrid, and Honoris Causa Doctorates from the Universities of Patras (Greece), Concepción (Chile) and San Marcos (Peru).
