= Villameca =

- Minor local entity
- Location within Province of León Location within Castile and León Location within Spain
- Coordinates: 42°38′25″N 6°4′31″W
- Country: Spain
- Autonomous community: Castile and León
- Province: Province of León
- Municipality: Quintana del Castillo
- Elevation: 979 m (3,212 ft)

Population
  - Total: 79

Villameca is a locality and minor local entity located in the municipality of Quintana del Castillo, in the province of León, Castile and León, Spain. As of 2020, it has a population of 79.

== Geography ==
Villameca is located 49km west of León, Spain.
