= Valbuena de la Encomienda =

- Minor local entity
- Location within Province of León Location within Castile and León Location within Spain
- Coordinates: 42°37′13″N 6°9′1″W
- Country: Spain
- Autonomous community: Castile and León
- Province: Province of León
- Municipality: Villagatón
- Elevation: 1,012 m (3,320 ft)

Population
  - Total: 8

Valbuena de la Encomienda is a locality and minor local entity located in the municipality of Villagatón, in León province, Castile and León, Spain.

Its true full name is Valbuena de la Encomienda del Santo Hospital de San Juan de Jerusalem, which points to its origin as the domain of the Knights Hospitallers based a few kilometers away, in the Cueto de San Bartolo Monastery, in Villameca. This village, currently made up of about a dozen inhabited houses, was in its time an important industrial hub, where the mills and ironworks of the region were concentrated, probably under the protection of the adjacent privileges of being a monastic domain.

Its territory has been exploited since immemorial time and there are still traces of iron, and even gold, mines. Its ferruginous, sulphurous and magnesium waters were also famous for being beneficial for a large number of conditions, which made the village be placed among the best known for this subject within the province of Leon.

Its small church, built by the military order, still preserves the old medieval flavor.

== Geography ==
Valbuena de la Encomienda is located 85 km west of León, Spain.
