= Villanueva del Árbol =

- Minor local entity
- Location within Province of León Location within Castile and León Location within Spain
- Coordinates: 42°39′29″N 5°31′37″W
- Country: Spain
- Autonomous community: Castile and León
- Province: Province of León
- Municipality: Villaquilambre
- Elevation: 855 m (2,805 ft)

Population
  - Total: 205

Villanueva del Árbol is a locality and minor local entity located in the municipality of Villaquilambre, in León province, Castile and León, Spain. As of 2020, it has a population of 205.

== Geography ==
Villanueva del Árbol is located 11km north-northeast of León, Spain.
