= San Feliz de las Lavanderas =

- Minor local entity
- Location within Province of León Location within Castile and León Location within Spain
- Coordinates: 42°41′8″N 5°58′38″W
- Country: Spain
- Autonomous community: Castile and León
- Province: Province of León
- Municipality: Quintana del Castillo
- Elevation: 1,176 m (3,858 ft)

Population (2020)
  - Total: 28

San Feliz de las Lavanderas is a locality and minor local entity located in the municipality of Quintana del Castillo, in the province of León, Castile and León, Spain. As of 2020, it has a population of 28.

== Geography ==
San Feliz de las Lavanderas is located 44km west-northwest of León, Spain.
