= Escuredo =

- Minor local entity
- Location within Province of León Location within Castile and León Location within Spain
- Coordinates: 42°41′30″N 5°56′48″W
- Country: Spain
- Autonomous community: Castile and León
- Province: Province of León
- Municipality: Quintana del Castillo
- Elevation: 1,136 m (3,727 ft)

Population
  - Total: 30

Escuredo is a locality and minor local entity located in the municipality of Quintana del Castillo, in the province of León, Castile and León, Spain. As of 2020, it has a population of 30.

== Geography ==
Escuredo is located 66km west-northwest of León, Spain.
