= Camplongo de Arbas =

- Minor local entity
- Location within Province of León Location within Castile and León Location within Spain
- Coordinates: 42°59′9″N 5°41′14″W
- Country: Spain
- Autonomous community: Castile and León
- Province: Province of León
- Municipality: Villamanín
- Elevation: 1,213 m (3,980 ft)

Population
  - Total: 21

Camplongo de Arbas is a locality and minor local entity located in the municipality of Villamanín, in León province, Castile and León, Spain. As of 2020, it has a population of 21.

== Geography ==
Camplongo de Arbas is located 54km north-northwest of León, Spain.
