= Castro de Cepeda =

- Minor local entity
- Location within Province of León Location within Castile and León Location within Spain
- Coordinates: 42°39′29″N 6°1′41″W
- Country: Spain
- Autonomous community: Castile and León
- Province: Province of León
- Municipality: Quintana del Castillo
- Elevation: 1,006 m (3,301 ft)

Population
  - Total: 32

Castro de Cepeda is a locality and minor local entity located in the municipality of Quintana del Castillo, in the province of León, Castile and León, Spain. As of 2020, it has a population of 32.

== Geography ==
Castro de Cepeda is located 45km west of León, Spain.
