= Brañuelas =

- Minor local entity
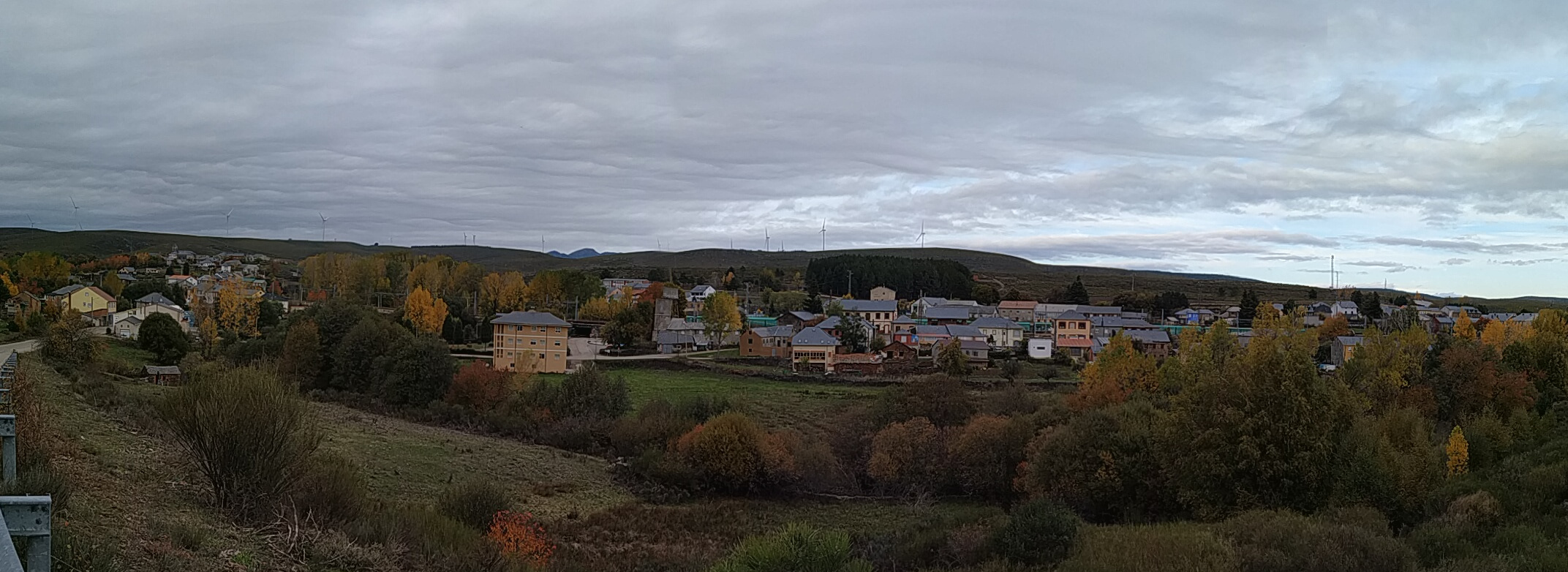

- Location within Province of León Location within Castile and León Location within Spain
- Coordinates: 42°38′14″N 6°12′29″W
- Country: Spain
- Autonomous community: Castile and León
- Province: Province of León
- Municipality: Villagatón
- Elevation: 1,013 m (3,323 ft)

Population
  - Total: 225

Brañuelas is a locality and minor local entity located in the municipality of Villagatón, in León province, Castile and León, Spain As of 2020, it has a population of 225.

== Geography ==
Brañuelas is located 81km west of León, Spain.
