= Culebros =

- Minor local entity
- Location within Province of León Location within Castile and León Location within Spain
- Coordinates: 42°38′34″N 6°6′8″W
- Country: Spain
- Autonomous community: Castile and León
- Province: Province of León
- Municipality: Villagatón
- Elevation: 1,021 m (3,350 ft)

Population
  - Total: 68

Culebros is a locality and minor local entity located in the municipality of Villagatón, in León province, Castile and León, Spain. As of 2020, it has a population of 68.

== Geography ==
Culebros is located 52km west of León, Spain.
