= Ferreras, León =

Ferreras
- Minor local entity
- Location within Province of León Location within Castile and León Location within Spain
- Coordinates: 42°38′23″N 5°56′59″W
- Country: Spain
- Autonomous community: Castile and León
- Province: Province of León
- Municipality: Quintana del Castillo
- Elevation: 982 m (3,222 ft)

Population
  - Total: 117

Ferreras is a locality and minor local entity located in the municipality of Quintana del Castillo, in the province of León, Castile and León, Spain. As of 2020, it has a population of 117.

== Geography ==
Ferreras is located 38 km west of León, Spain.
