= Pendilla de Arbas =

- Minor local entity
- Location within Province of León Location within Castile and León Location within Spain
- Coordinates: 43°1′33″N 5°42′10″W
- Country: Spain
- Autonomous community: Castile and León
- Province: Province of León
- Municipality: Villamanín
- Elevation: 1,322 m (4,337 ft)

Population
  - Total: 22

Pendilla de Arbas is a locality and minor local entity located in the municipality of Villamanín, in León province, Castile and León, Spain. As of 2020, it had a population of 22.

== Geography ==
Pendilla de Arbas is located 59km north-northwest of León, Spain.
