= Villaquilambre =

- Municipality
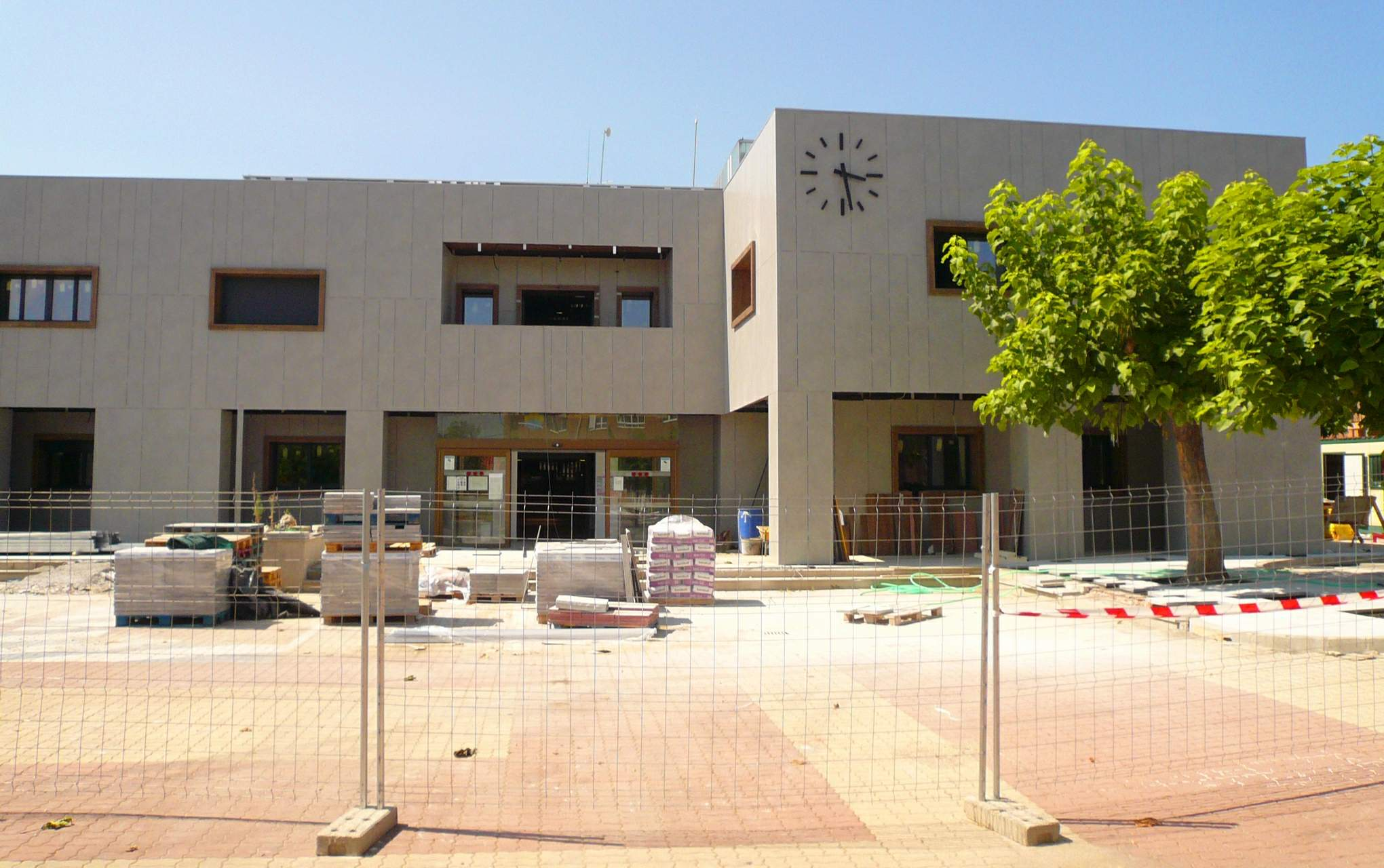
- Town hall

- Flag Coat of arms

- Location in Spain
- Coordinates: 42°38′19″N 5°33′27″W
- Country: Spain
- Autonomous Community: Castile and León
- Province: León
- Comarca: Tierras de León

Government
  - Mayor: Vicente Álvarez Flórez (UPL)

Area
  - Total: 52.69 km^{2} (20.34 sq mi)
- Elevation (AMSL): 890 m (2,920 ft)

Population (2025-01-01)
  - Total: 18,905
  - Density: 358.8/km^{2} (929.3/sq mi)
- Time zone: UTC+1 (CET)
  - Summer (DST): UTC+2 (CEST (GMT +2))
- Postal code: 24012, 24193
- Area code: +34 (Spain) + 987 (León)
- Climate: Cfb
- Website: www.villaquilambre.es

Villaquilambre (Spanish pronunciation: [biʎakiˈlambɾe]) (Villaquirame in Leonese language) is a municipality located in the Province of León, Castile and León, Spain. According to the 2025 census (INE), the municipality has a population of 18,905.

== Geography ==
Villaquilambre is a municipality located about 5 kilometres (3 mi) north of León on the right bank of the river Torío. It covers an area of 52.7 km^{2} (20 mi^{2}). The highest point in the municipality is the Alto de la Vallina Fonda, which rises to 1,028 m (3,373 ft), and the average height is 870 m (2,854 ft) above sea level. To the west lies the municipality of Sariegos, to the north the municipality of Garrafe de Torío and to the east the municipality of Valdefresno. Villaquilambre is situated on the boundary of the broad valley to the south, where the Torío joins the Bernesga, and the Cantabrian mountain range to the north. The slopes to the west and north of the town are forested with oaks, including the Mediterranean oak, and the land near the River Torío to the east has willow and poplar, with pine forests on the slopes above.

Villages in the municipality include Alfoz de León, Canaleja de Torío, Castrillino, Navatejera, Robledo de Torío, Villamoros de las Regueras, Villanueva del Árbol, Villaobispo de la Regueras, Villaquilambre, Villarrodrigo de la Regueras, and Villasinta de Torío. There are the remnants of a Roman villa at Navatejera, with fine mosaics and the remains of hot baths; agricultural tools found at the site are on display at the León Museum.

== Economy ==
Agriculture is predominant in the Province of León, but service industries are at the core of the economy of Villaquilambre, although since the construction of an industrial park in Navatejera in 2000, there have been more jobs created in the industrial and research sectors (notably with the pharmaceutical company Laboratorios León Farma). In part because it provides a cheaper alternative to inner city living in nearby León, Villaquilambre has increased in size dramatically in the 21st century. Between 2001 and 2008, there was an increase in population of 6,224 inhabitants, making it the fastest growing municipality in the province, ahead of Ponferrada and León.
