= Navatejera =

- Minor local entity
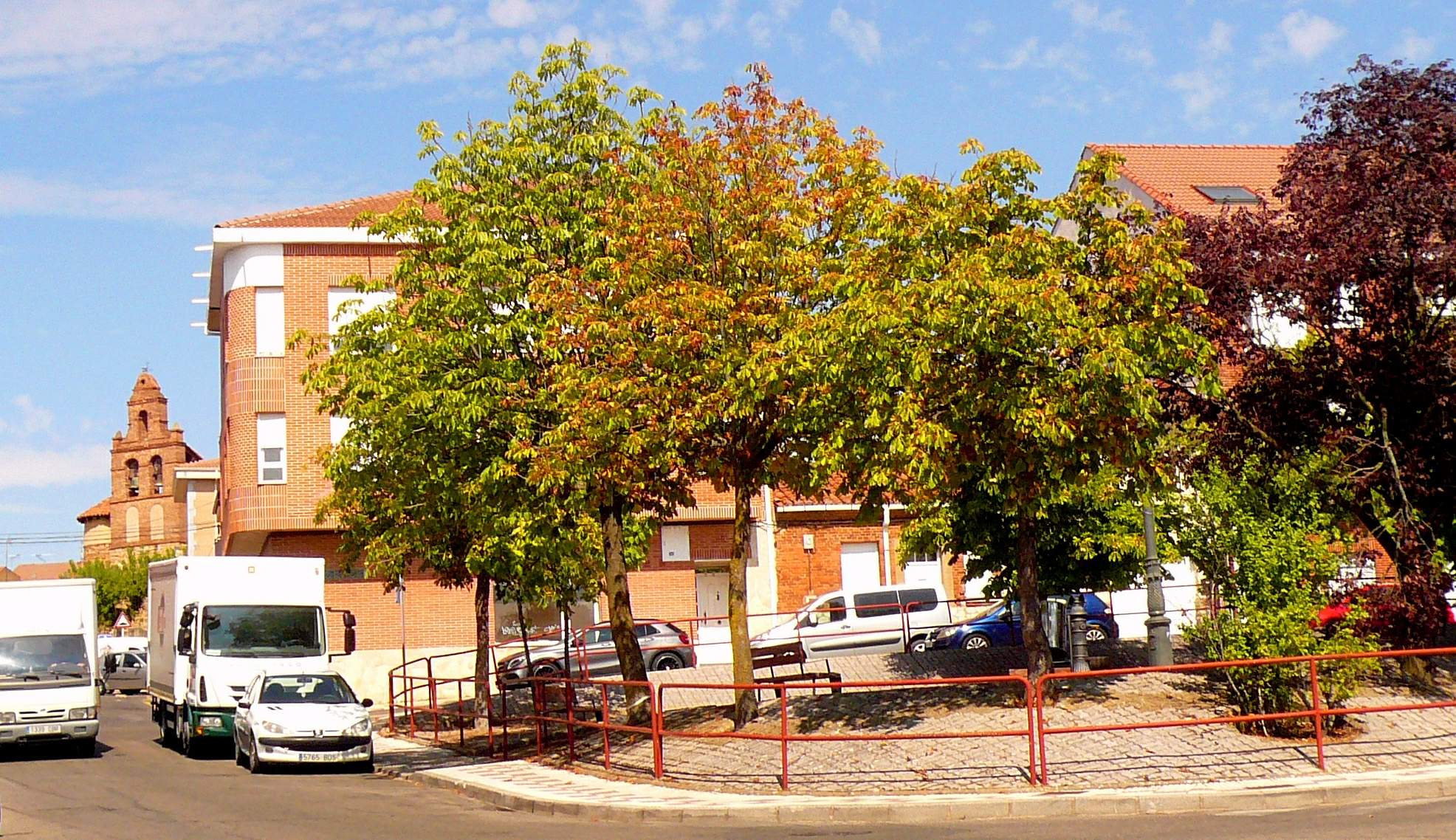

- Location within Province of León Location within Castile and León Location within Spain
- Coordinates: 42°37′41″N 5°33′56″W
- Country: Spain
- Autonomous community: Castile and León
- Province: Province of León
- Municipality: Villaquilambre
- Elevation: 873 m (2,864 ft)

Population
  - Total: 7,965
- Time zone: UTC + 1

Navatejera is a locality and minor local entity located in the municipality of Villaquilambre, in León province, Castile and León, Spain. As of 2020, it has a population of 7965.

== Geography ==
Navatejera is located 7km north of León, Spain.
