= Manzanal del Puerto =

- Minor local entity
- Location within Province of León Location within Castile and León Location within Spain
- Coordinates: 42°35′28″N 6°13′21″W
- Country: Spain
- Autonomous community: Castile and León
- Province: Province of León
- Municipality: Villagatón
- Elevation: 1,148 m (3,766 ft)

Population
  - Total: 62

Manzanal del Puerto is a locality and minor local entity located in the municipality of Villagatón, in León province, Castile and León, Spain. As of 2020, it has a population of 62.

== Geography ==
Manzanal del Puerto is located 74km west of León, Spain.
