= Robledo de Torío =

- Minor local entity
- Location within Province of León Location within Castile and León Location within Spain
- Coordinates: 42°39′4″N 5°31′45″W
- Country: Spain
- Autonomous community: Castile and León
- Province: Province of León
- Municipality: Villaquilambre
- Elevation: 851 m (2,792 ft)

Population
  - Total: 427

Robledo de Torío is a locality and minor local entity located in the municipality of Villaquilambre, in León province, Castile and León, Spain. As of 2020, it has a population of 427.

== Geography ==
Robledo de Torío is located 10km north-northeast of León, Spain.
