= Poladura de la Tercia =

- Minor local entity
- Location within Province of León Location within Castile and León Location within Spain
- Coordinates: 42°56′45″N 5°43′17″W
- Country: Spain
- Autonomous community: Castile and León
- Province: Province of León
- Municipality: Villamanín
- Elevation: 1,225 m (4,019 ft)

Population
  - Total: 59

Poladura de la Tercia is a locality and minor local entity located in the municipality of Villamanín, in León province, Castile and León, Spain. As of 2020, it has a population of 59.

== Geography ==
Poladura de la Tercia is located 79km north-northwest of León.

The lands of Poladura de la Tercia border with those of Busdongo to the north, Camplongo de la Tercia and Villanueva de la Tercia to the northeast, San Martín de la Tercia to the east, Cármenes to the southeast, Villasimpliz, Buiza and Folledo to the south, Geras and Aralla de Luna to the southwest, Cubillas de Arbas and Casares de Arbas to the west, and Viadangos de Arbas and Arbas del Puerto to the northwest.
