= Casares de Arbas =

- Minor local entity
- Casares de Arbás
- Location within Province of León Location within Castile and León Location within Spain
- Coordinates: 42°56′21″N 5°46′43″W
- Country: Spain
- Autonomous community: Castile and León
- Province: Province of León
- Municipality: Villamanín
- Elevation: 1,323 m (4,341 ft)

Population
  - Total: 54

Casares de Arbas or Casares de Arbás is a locality and minor local entity located in the municipality of Villamanín, in León province, Castile and León, Spain. As of 2020, it has a population of 54.

== Geography ==
Casares de Arbas is located 73km north-northwest of León, Spain.
