= Villasinta de Torío =

- Minor local entity
- Location within Province of León Location within Castile and León Location within Spain
- Coordinates: 42°39′51″N 5°33′12″W
- Country: Spain
- Autonomous community: Castile and León
- Province: Province of León
- Municipality: Villaquilambre
- Elevation: 905 m (2,969 ft)

Population
  - Total: 386

Villasinta de Torío is a locality and minor local entity located in the municipality of Villaquilambre, in León province, Castile and León, Spain. As of 2020, it has a population of 386.

== Geography ==
Villasinta de Torío is located 12km north-northeast of León, Spain.
