= Morriondo =

- Minor local entity
- Location within Province of León Location within Castile and León Location within Spain
- Coordinates: 42°38′34″N 5°58′1″W
- Country: Spain
- Autonomous community: Castile and León
- Province: Province of León
- Municipality: Quintana del Castillo
- Elevation: 1,010 m (3,310 ft)

Population
  - Total: 57

Morriondo is a locality and minor local entity located in the municipality of Quintana del Castillo, in the province of León, Castile and León, Spain. As of 2020, it has a population of 57.

== Geography ==
Morriondo is located 39km west of León, Spain.
