= Riofrío, León =

Riofrío
- Minor local entity
- Location within Province of León Location within Castile and León Location within Spain
- Coordinates: 42°36′41″N 5°56′2″W
- Country: Spain
- Autonomous community: Castile and León
- Province: Province of León
- Municipality: Quintana del Castillo
- Elevation: 938 m (3,077 ft)

Population
  - Total: 145

Riofrío (Leonese: Rufríu) is a locality and minor local entity located in the municipality of Quintana del Castillo, in the province of León, Castile and León, Spain. As of 2020, it has a population of 145.

== Geography ==
Riofrío is located 34km west of León, Spain.
