= Villarmeriel =

- Minor local entity
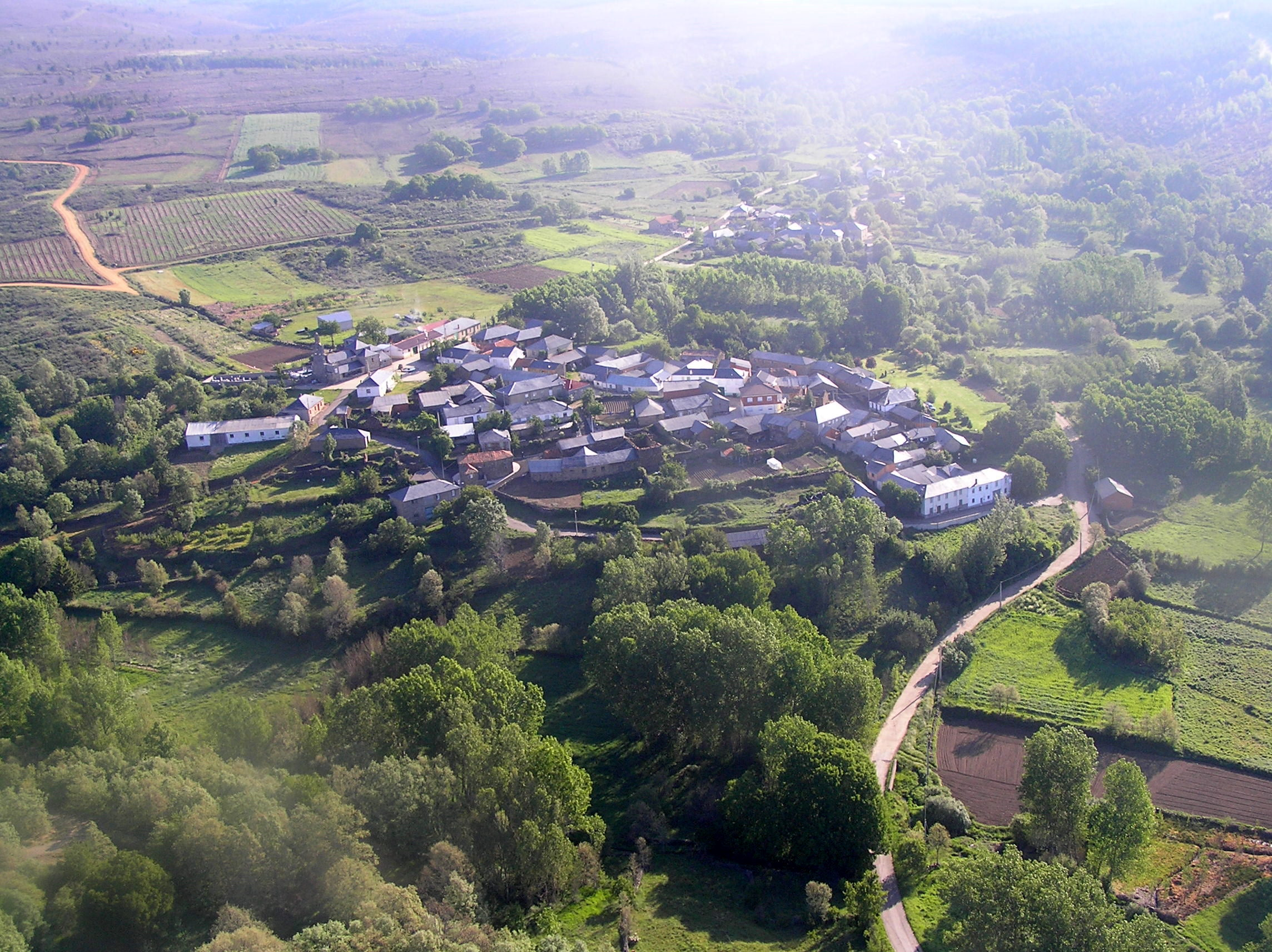

- Location within Province of León Location within Castile and León Location within Spain
- Coordinates: 42°40′47″N 6°1′18″W
- Country: Spain
- Autonomous community: Castile and León
- Province: Province of León
- Municipality: Quintana del Castillo
- Elevation: 1,093 m (3,586 ft)

Population
  - Total: 31

Villarmeriel is a locality and minor local entity located in the municipality of Quintana del Castillo, in León province, Castile and León, Spain. As of 2020, it has a population of 31.

== Geography ==
Villarmeriel is located 50km west-northwest of León, Spain.
