= Cubillas de Arbas =

- Minor local entity
- Cubillas de Arbás
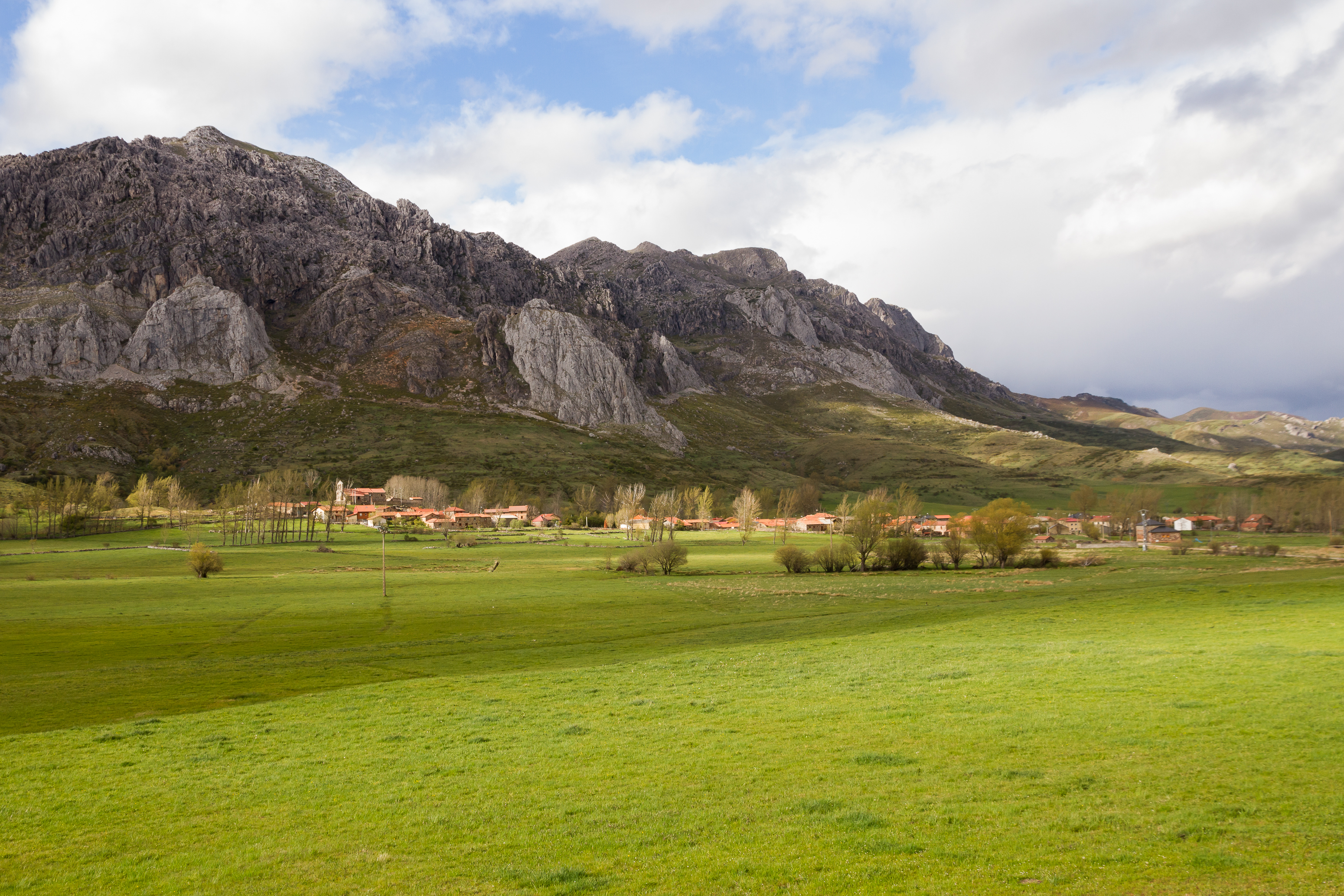

- Location within Province of León Location within Castile and León Location within Spain
- Coordinates: 42°55′43″N 5°48′18″W
- Country: Spain
- Autonomous community: Castile and León
- Province: Province of León
- Municipality: Villamanín
- Elevation: 1,306 m (4,285 ft)

Population
  - Total: 60

Cubillas de Arbas or Cubillas de Arbás is a locality and minor local entity located in the municipality of Villamanín, in León province, Castile and León, Spain. As of 2020, it has a population of 60.

== Geography ==
Cubillas de Arbas is located 71km north-northwest of León, Spain.
