= Villanueva de la Tercia =

- Minor local entity
- Location within Province of León Location within Castile and León Location within Spain
- Coordinates: 42°57′54″N 5°40′10″W
- Country: Spain
- Autonomous community: Castile and León
- Province: Province of León
- Municipality: Villamanín
- Elevation: 1,182 m (3,878 ft)

Population
  - Total: 32

Villanueva de la Tercia is a locality and minor local entity located in the municipality of Villamanín, in León province, Castile and León, Spain. As of 2020, it has a population of 32.

== Geography ==
Villanueva de la Tercia is located 51km north of León.
