= Sierra de la Cabrera =

Mountain range in Spain

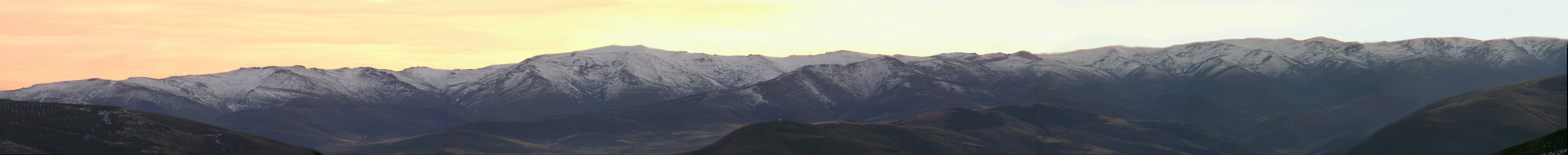
- Panoramic view

Highest point
- Elevation: 2,122 m (6,962 ft)

Geography
- Location: Iberian Peninsula, Spain
- Parent range: Montes de León

The Sierra de la Cabrera is a mountain range in northern Spain. The landscape shows evidence of past glaciation.

== Ecological importance ==
The Sierra de la Cabrera gives its name to a Site of Community Importance (ES4190110), where species of interest include the Kerry slug. The SCI partially overlaps with a Special Protection Area (ES4130024) designated under the Birds Directive.
