= Arbas del Puerto =

- Locality
- Arbás del Puerto
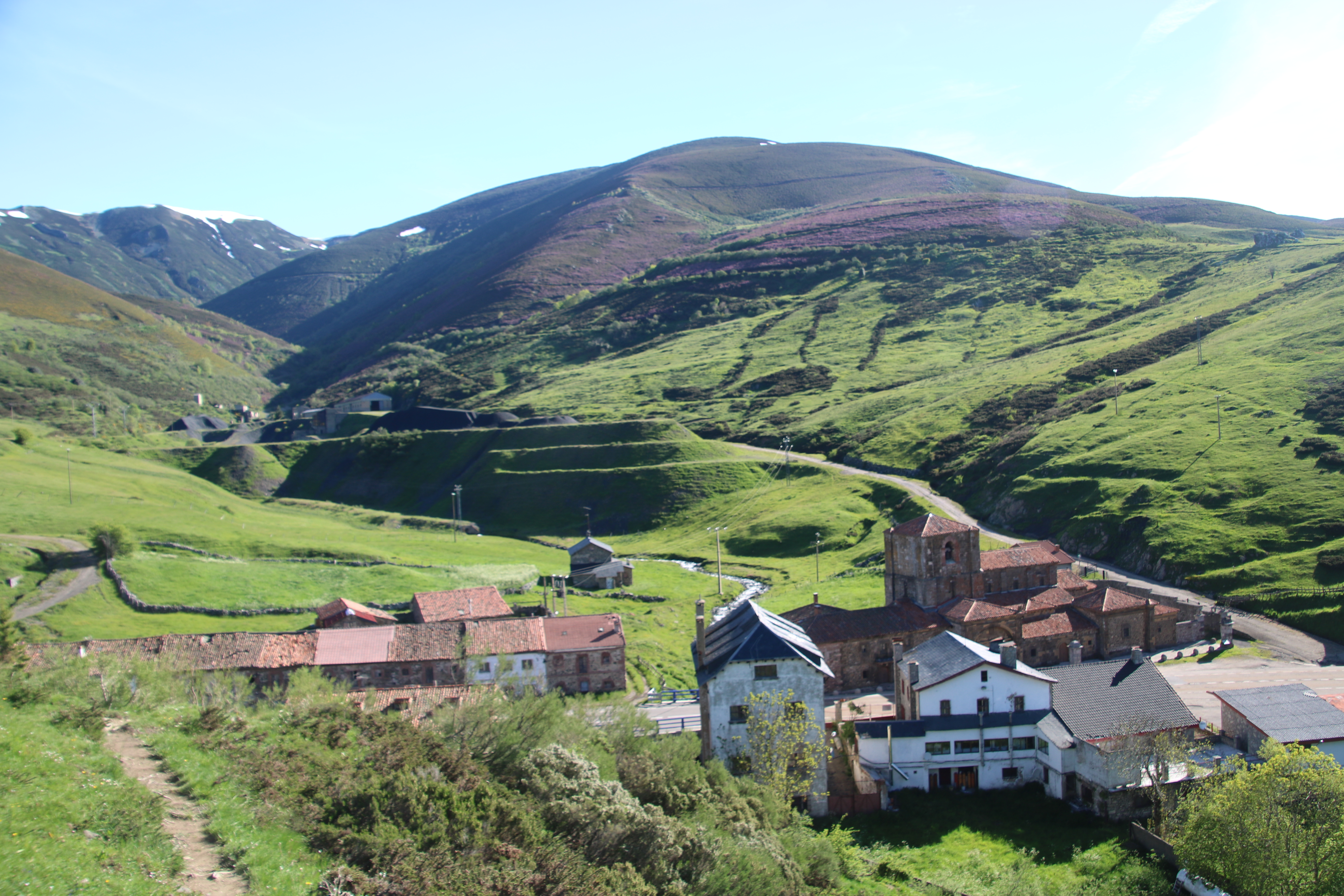

- Location within Province of León Location within Castile and León Location within Spain
- Coordinates: 42°59′36″N 5°44′37″W
- Country: Spain
- Autonomous community: Castile and León
- Province: Province of León
- Municipality: Villamanín
- Elevation: 1,350 m (4,430 ft)

Population
  - Total: 4

Arbas del Puerto or Arbás del Puerto is a hamlet located in the municipality of Villamanín, in León province, Castile and León, Spain. As of 2020, it has a population of 4.

== Geography ==
Arbas del Puerto is located 59km north-northwest of León, Spain.
