= Quintana del Castillo =

- Municipality
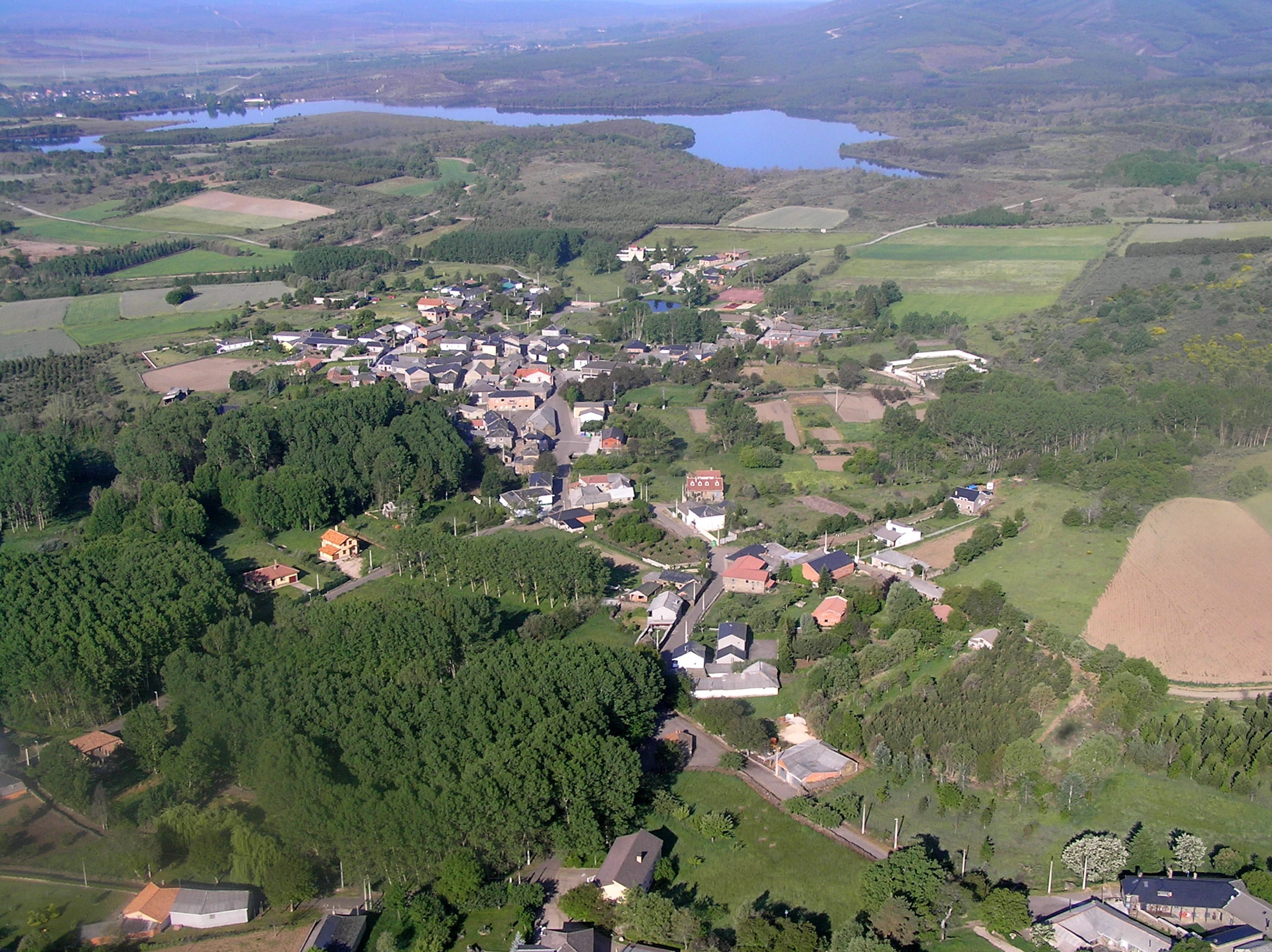
- Aerial view

- Coat of arms

- Location within Spain
- Coordinates: 42°39′41″N 6°02′42″W
- Country: Spain
- Community: Castile and León
- Province: León
- Comarca: La Cepeda

Government
  - Mayor: Emilio Francisco Cabeza Martínez

Area
  - Total: 155.71 km^{2} (60.12 sq mi)
- Elevation: 1,016 m (3,333 ft)

Population (2025-01-01)
  - Total: 699
  - Density: 4.49/km^{2} (11.6/sq mi)
- Time zone: UTC+1 (CET)
  - Summer (DST): UTC+2 (CEST)
- Postal code: 24397

Quintana del Castillo is a municipality located in the province of León, Castile and León, Spain. As of 2010 (data from INE), the municipality has a population of 909 inhabitants.

It is part of the historical region of La Cepeda.

== Villages ==
- Abano
- Castro de Cepeda
- Donillas
- Escuredo
- Ferreras
- Morriondo
- Palaciosmil
- Quintana del Castillo
- Riofrío
- San Feliz de las Lavanderas
- La Veguellina de Cepeda
- Villameca
- Villarmeriel

== See also ==
- Leonese language
- Kingdom of León
