= Tonín de Arbas =

- Minor local entity
- Location within Province of León Location within Castile and León Location within Spain
- Coordinates: 43°0′15″N 5°41′14″W
- Country: Spain
- Autonomous community: Castile and León
- Province: Province of León
- Municipality: Villamanín
- Elevation: 1,258 m (4,127 ft)

Population
  - Total: 23

Tonín de Arbas is a locality and minor local entity located in the municipality of Villamanín, in León province, Castile and León, Spain. As of 2020, it has a population of 23.

== Geography ==
Tonín de Arbas is located 57km north-northwest of León, Spain.
