= Villabraz =

- Municipality
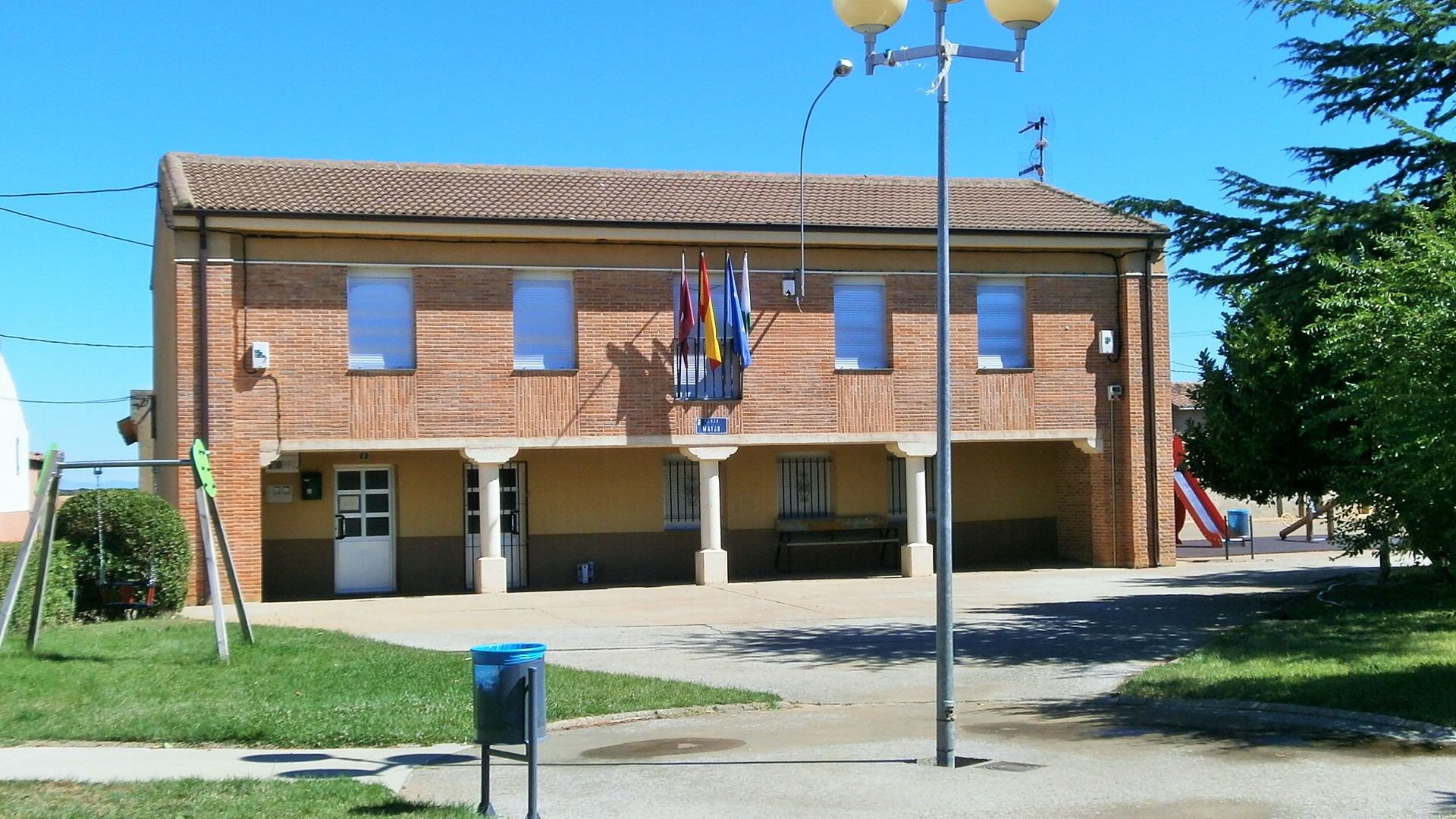
- Town hall

- Flag Coat of arms

- Location in Spain
- Coordinates: 42°15′N 5°27′W
- Country: Spain
- Autonomous community: Castile and León
- Province: León
- Municipality: Villabraz

Area
  - Total: 36 km^{2} (14 sq mi)
- Elevation: 848 m (2,782 ft)

Population (2025-01-01)
  - Total: 82
  - Density: 2.3/km^{2} (5.9/sq mi)
- Time zone: UTC+1 (CET)
  - Summer (DST): UTC+2 (CEST)

Villabraz is a municipality located in the province of León, Castile and León, Spain. According to the 2014 census, the municipality has a population of 110 inhabitants.

== Villages ==
- Villabraz
- Alcuetas
- Fáfilas

== See also ==
- Esla-Campos
