= Villagatón =

Coordinates: 42°38′N 6°10′W

- Flag Coat of arms

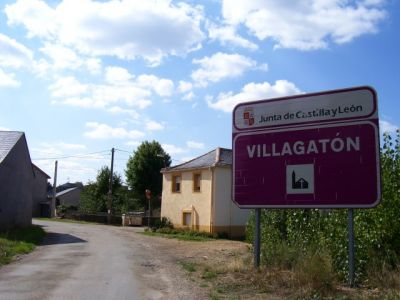
- Country: Spain
- Autonomous community: Castile and León
- Province: León
- Municipality: Villagatón

Area
  - Total: 167 km^{2} (64 sq mi)

Population (2025-01-01)
  - Total: 611
  - Density: 3.66/km^{2} (9.48/sq mi)
- Time zone: UTC+1 (CET)
  - Summer (DST): UTC+2 (CEST)

Villagatón is a municipality located in the province of León, Castile and León, Spain. According to the 2004 census (INE), the municipality has a population of 734 inhabitants.

Villagatón is part of the historical region of La Cepeda.

== Villages ==
- Los Barrios de Nistoso
- Tabladas y Villar
- Brañuelas
- Culebros
- Manzanal del Puerto
- Montealegre
- Requejo y Corús
- La Silva
- Ucedo
- Valbuena de la Encomienda
- Villagatón
