= Rodiezmo de la Tercia =

- Minor local entity
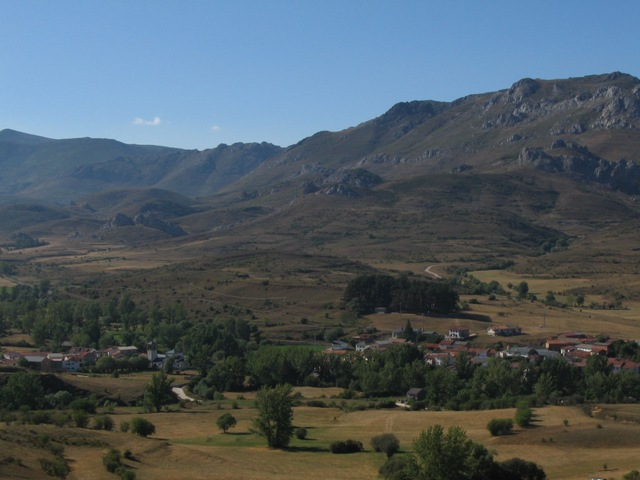

- Location within Province of León Location within Castile and León Location within Spain
- Coordinates: 42°56′19″N 5°41′8″W
- Country: Spain
- Autonomous community: Castile and León
- Province: Province of León
- Municipality: Villamanín
- Elevation: 1,154 m (3,786 ft)

Population
  - Total: 120

Rodiezmo de la Tercia is a locality and minor local entity located in the municipality of Villamanín, in León province, Castile and León, Spain. As of 2020, it has a population of 120.

== Geography ==
Rodiezmo de la Tercia is located 50km north-northwest of León, Spain.
