= Golpejar de la Tercia =

- Minor local entity
- Location within Province of León Location within Castile and León Location within Spain
- Coordinates: 42°57′12″N 5°39′13″W
- Country: Spain
- Autonomous community: Castile and León
- Province: Province of León
- Municipality: Villamanín
- Elevation: 1,183 m (3,881 ft)

Population
  - Total: 15

Golpejar de la Tercia is a locality and minor local entity located in the municipality of Villamanín, in León province, Castile and León, Spain. As of 2020, it has a population of 15.

== Geography ==
Golpejar de la Tercia is located 50 km north of León, Spain.
