= Cave of Valporquero =

Cave in the Province of León, Spain

Coordinates: 42°54′N 5°33′W

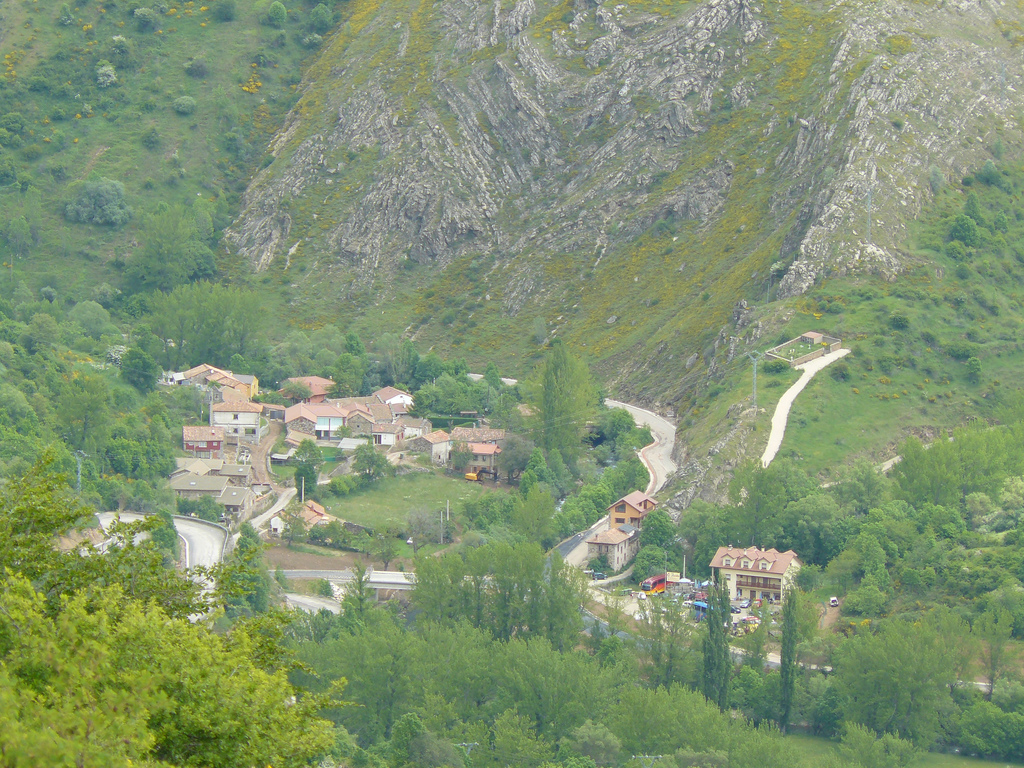
Village at the beginning of the road to Valporquero and to Valporquero cave.

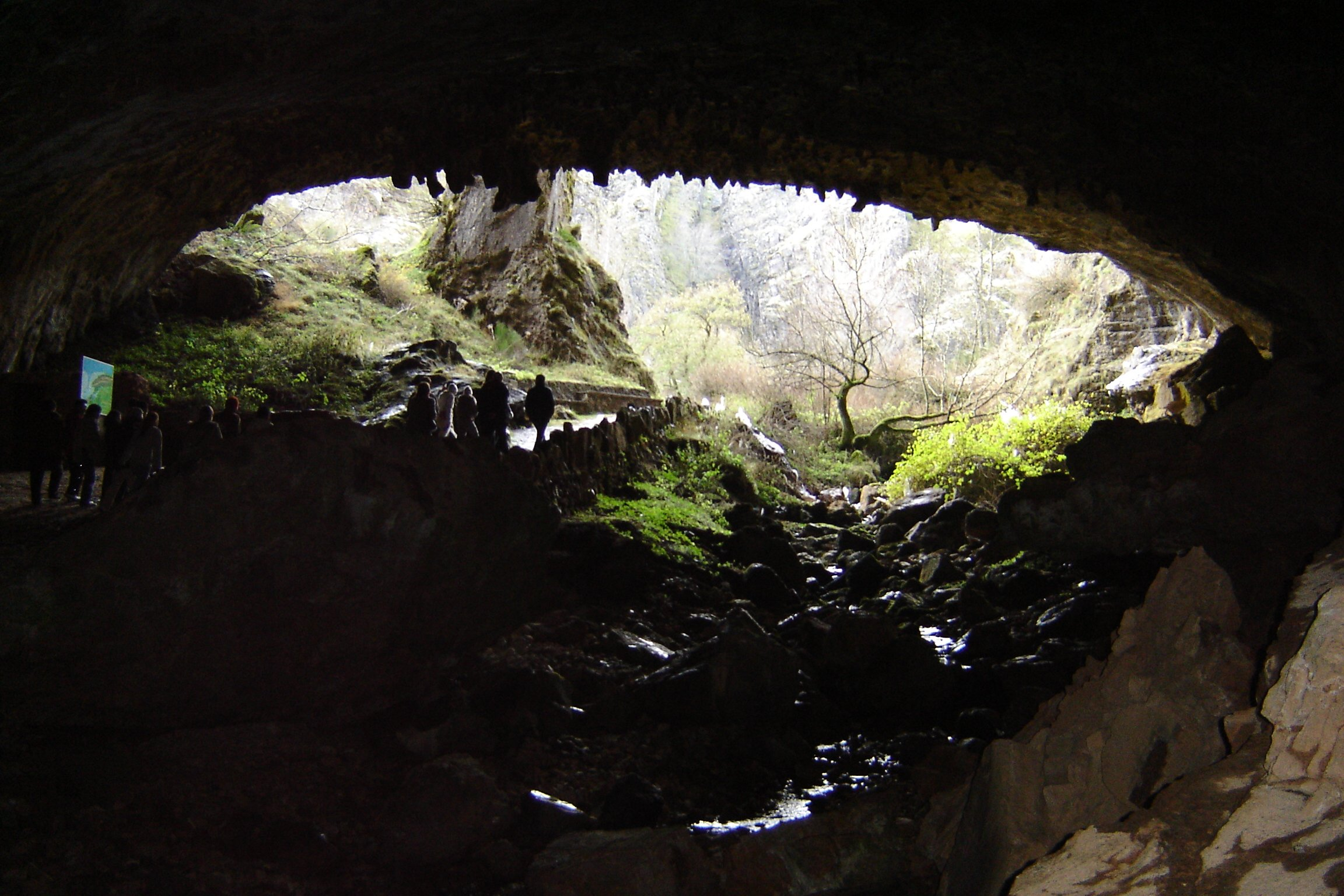
Entrance to the Valporquero cave.

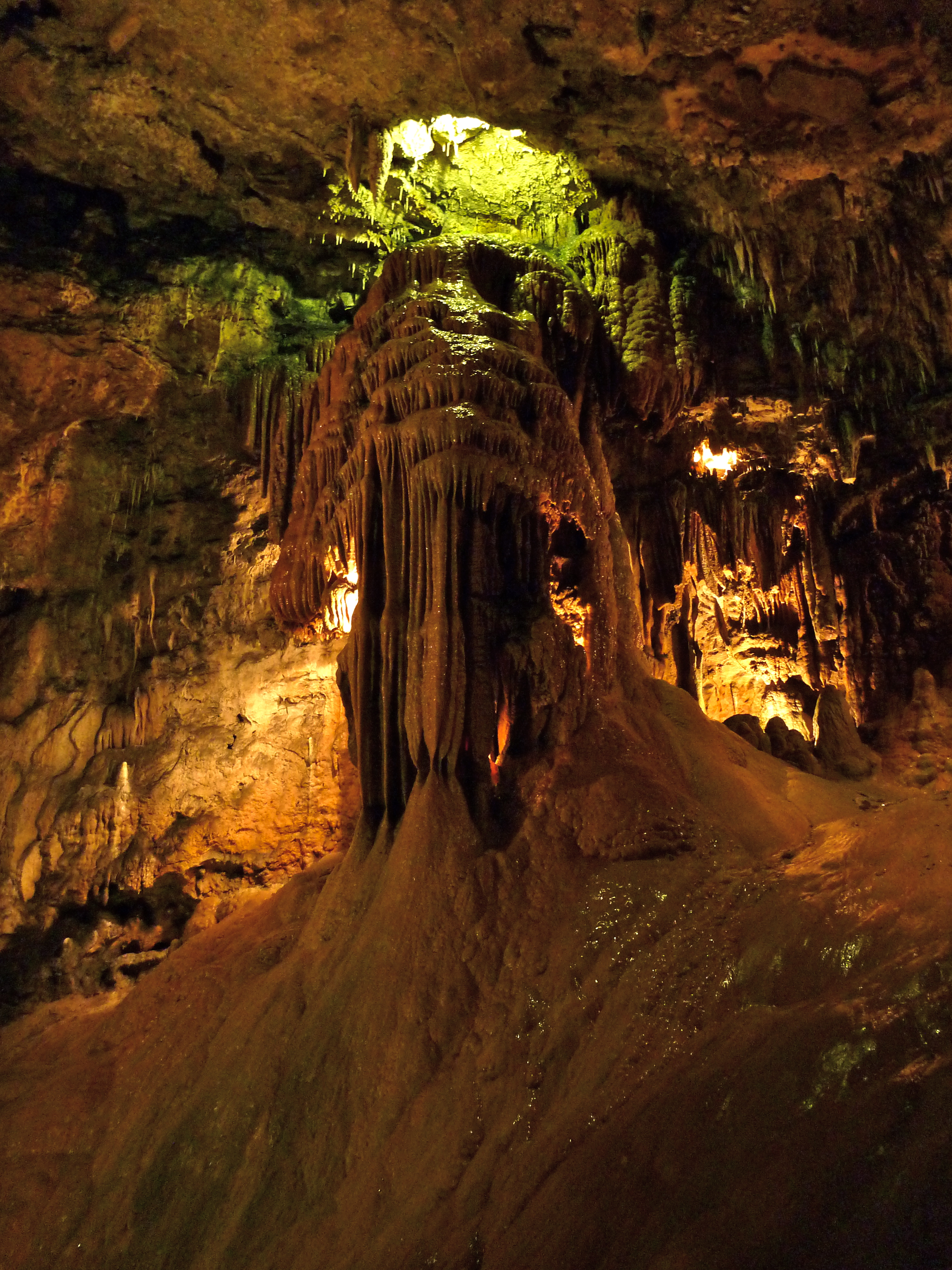
Detail of the Maravillas hall.

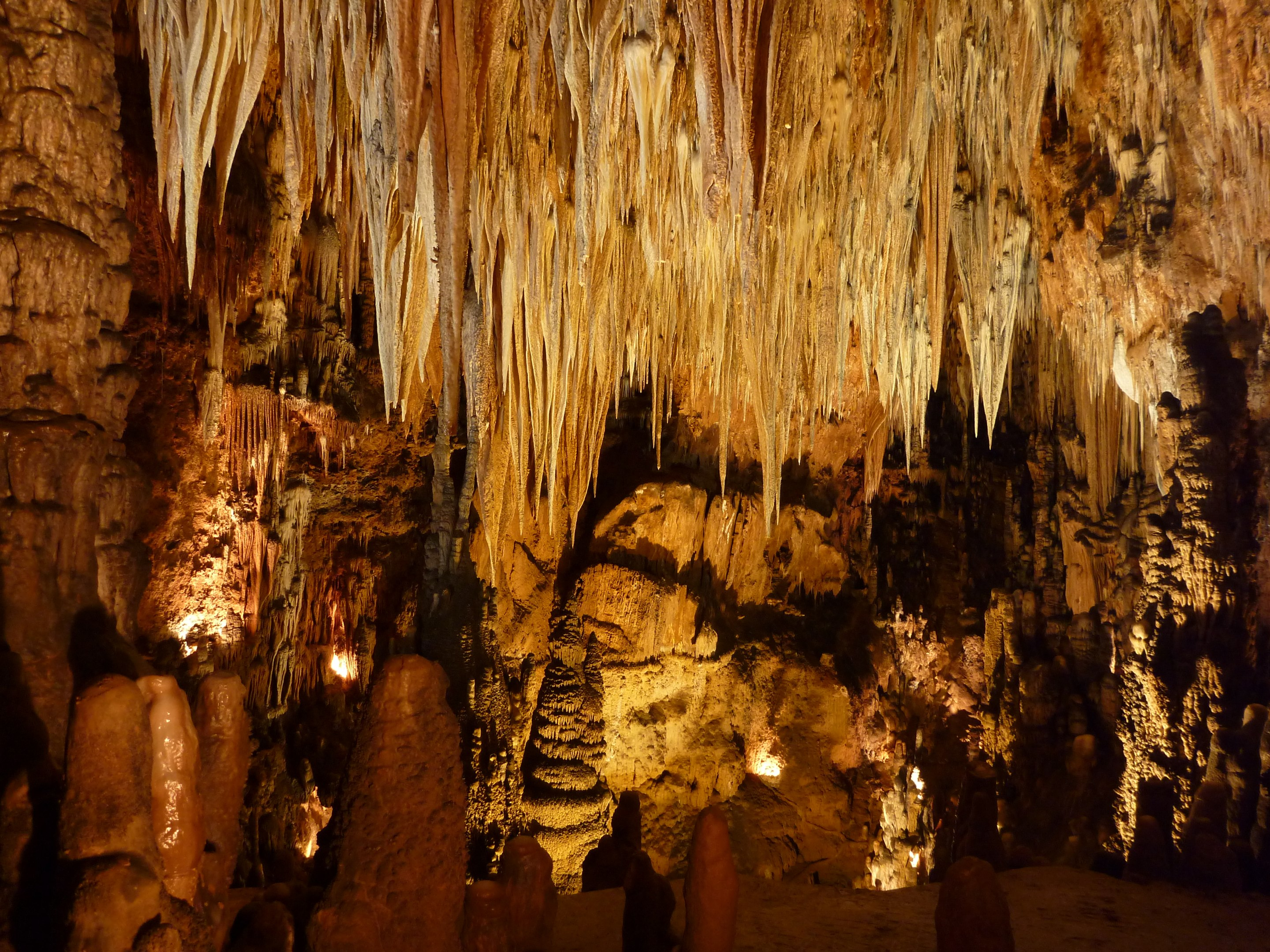
Detail of a stalactite in the Valporquero cave.

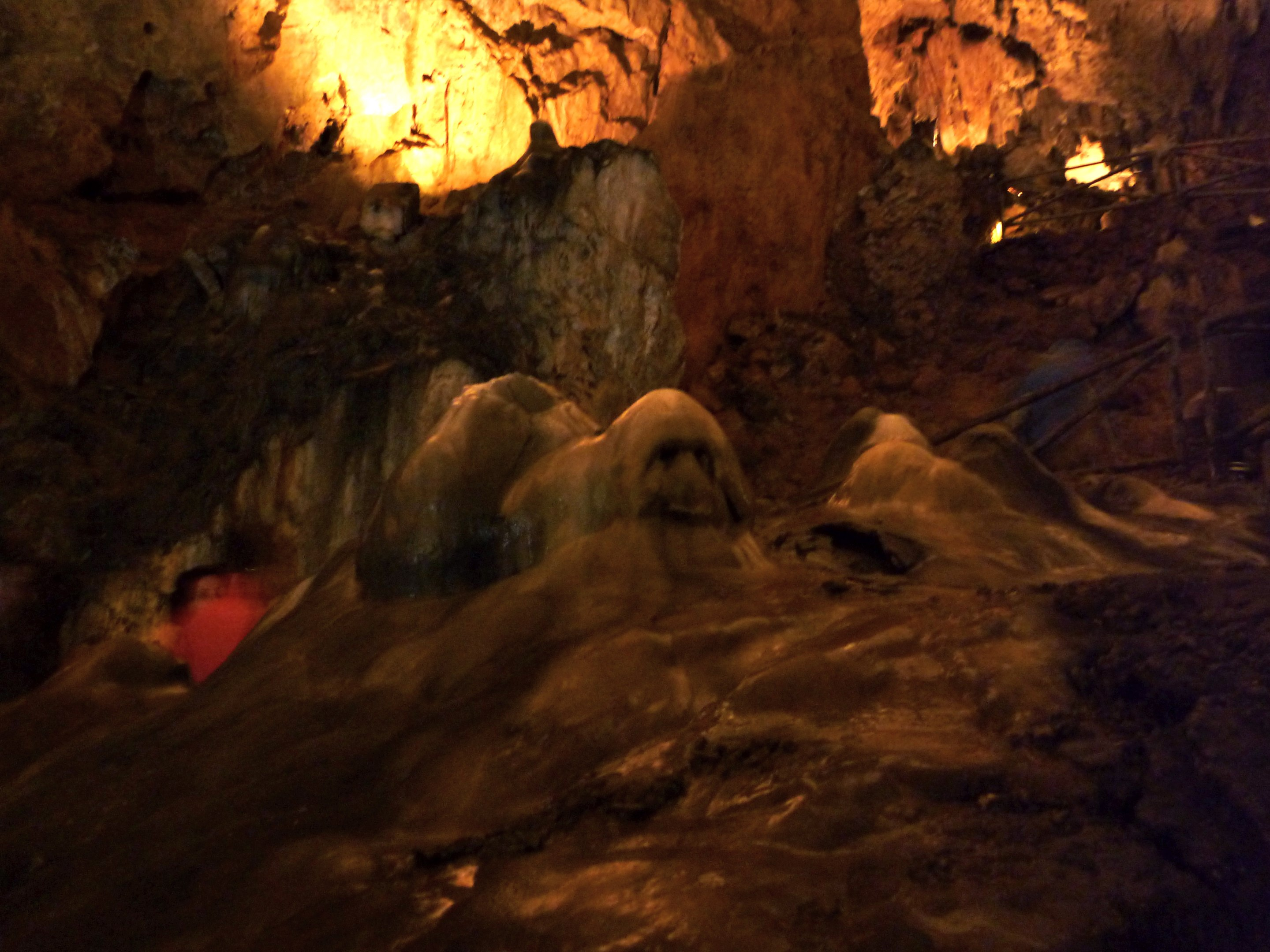
The Phantom.

The cave of Valporquero (la cueva de Valporquero" is located at the north of the Province of León (Spain), near the village of Valporquero de Torío in the municipality of Vegacervera and 47 km away from the capital city, León. Open to the tourism since 1966, the management is done by the Diputación de León.

The "open route" to the normal tourism is 1300 m long through six "halls" with increasing complexity and diversity of the geological formations, from the small marvels hall to the marvel hall.

The "bottom level is 3150 m long" including a subterranean river.

The main six halls are:

- Pequeñas maravillas (small marvels hall)
- Gran Rotonda
- Hadas
- Cementerio estalactítico
- Gran vía
- Maravillas (marvel hall)

== See also ==
- Province of León
- Montes de León
