= La Robla =

- Municipality
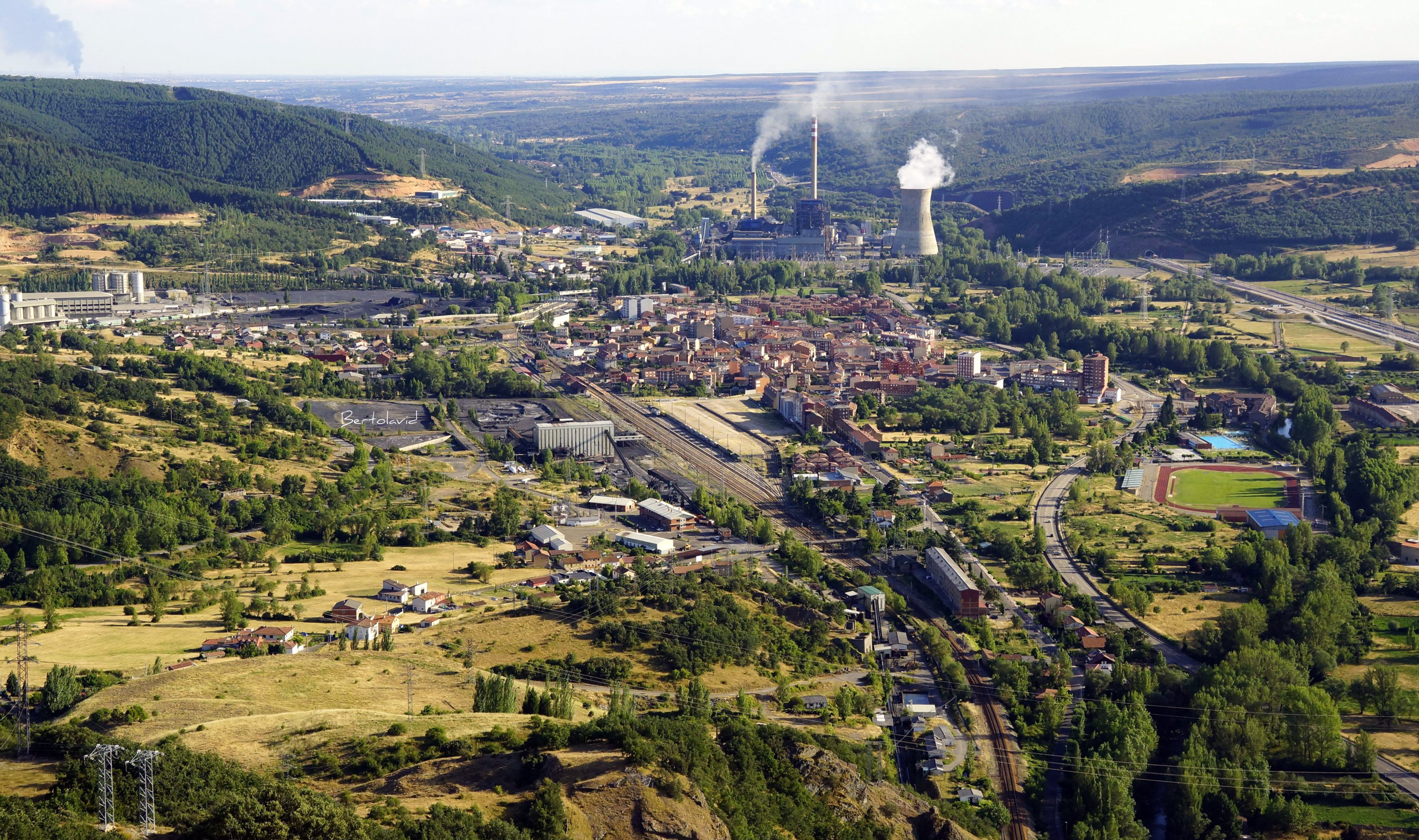

- Flag Coat of arms

- Location is Castile and León Location in Spain
- Coordinates: 42°48′N 5°37′W
- Country: Spain
- Autonomous community: Castile and León
- Province: León

Area
  - Total: 84 km^{2} (32 sq mi)

Population (2025-01-01)
  - Total: 3,574
  - Density: 43/km^{2} (110/sq mi)
- Time zone: UTC+1 (CET)
  - Summer (DST): UTC+2 (CEST)

La Robla is a municipality located in the province of León, Castile and León, Spain. According to the 2020 census (INE), the municipality has a population of 3,752 inhabitants.

The area around La Robla was once an important mining community. The train route from La Robla to Bilbao was essential to the development of trade in the region. There is now a luxury passenger train service that travels along the narrow-gauge railway visiting tourist spots along the way.

A map of La Robla

== Demography of La Robla ==
Historical population

Year	Pop.	±%
1900	2,749	—
1910	3,088	+12.3%
1920	3,705	+20.0%
1930	3,430	−7.4%
1940	3,039	−11.4%
1950	3,120	+2.7%

Year	Pop.	±%
1960	4,545	+45.7%
1970	5,424	+19.3%
1981	5,339	−1.6%
1991	5,487	+2.8%
2001	4,829	−12.0%
2020	3,783	−21.7%

== See also ==
- La Robla railway
