= Bernesga =

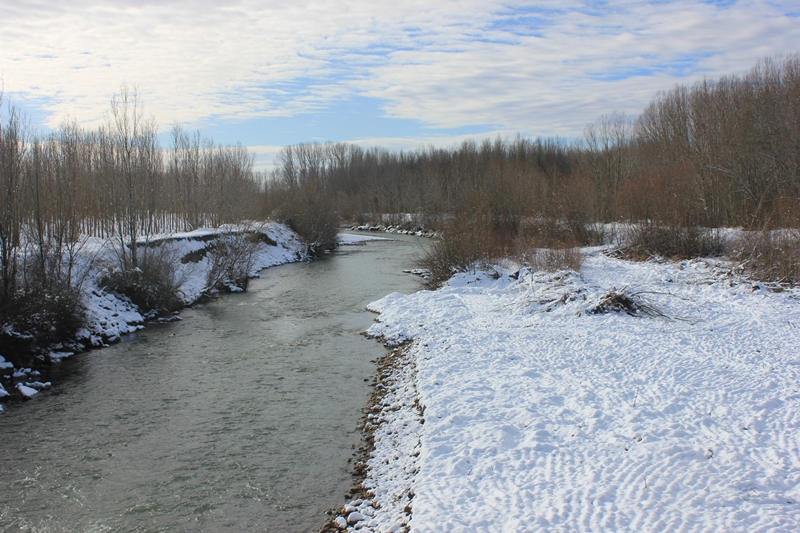
- The Bernesga near Carbajal de la Legua

Location
- Country: Spain

Physical characteristics
- Source: Cantabrian Mountains
  - location: Villamanín
  - coordinates: 42°58′44″N 5°45′40″W
  - elevation: 1,580 m (5,180 ft)
- Mouth: Esla
  - location: Vega de Infanzones
  - coordinates: 42°28′23″N 5°31′12″W
  - elevation: 770 m (2,530 ft)
- Length: 80 km (50 mi)
- Basin size: 1,188 km^{2} (459 sq mi)

Basin features
- Progression: Esla→ Douro→ Atlantic Ocean

The Bernesga is a river in the northwest of the Iberian Peninsula. It is born near the Puerto de Pajares in the Cantabrian Mountains at around 1,580 metres above mean sea level, running along around 80 km throughout territory of the Spanish province of León until discharging into the Esla near Vega de Infanzones and Palanquinos. The N-630 road connecting Asturias and the Meseta Central runs parallel to the river. León is the biggest city on the Bernesga.

Featuring a catchment area of around 1,187.6 km^{2}, it receives contributions from the Camplongo, Rodiezmo, Casares, and Torío, among other tributaries.
