= Vega de Infanzones =

Coordinates: 42°29′N 5°32′W

- municipality
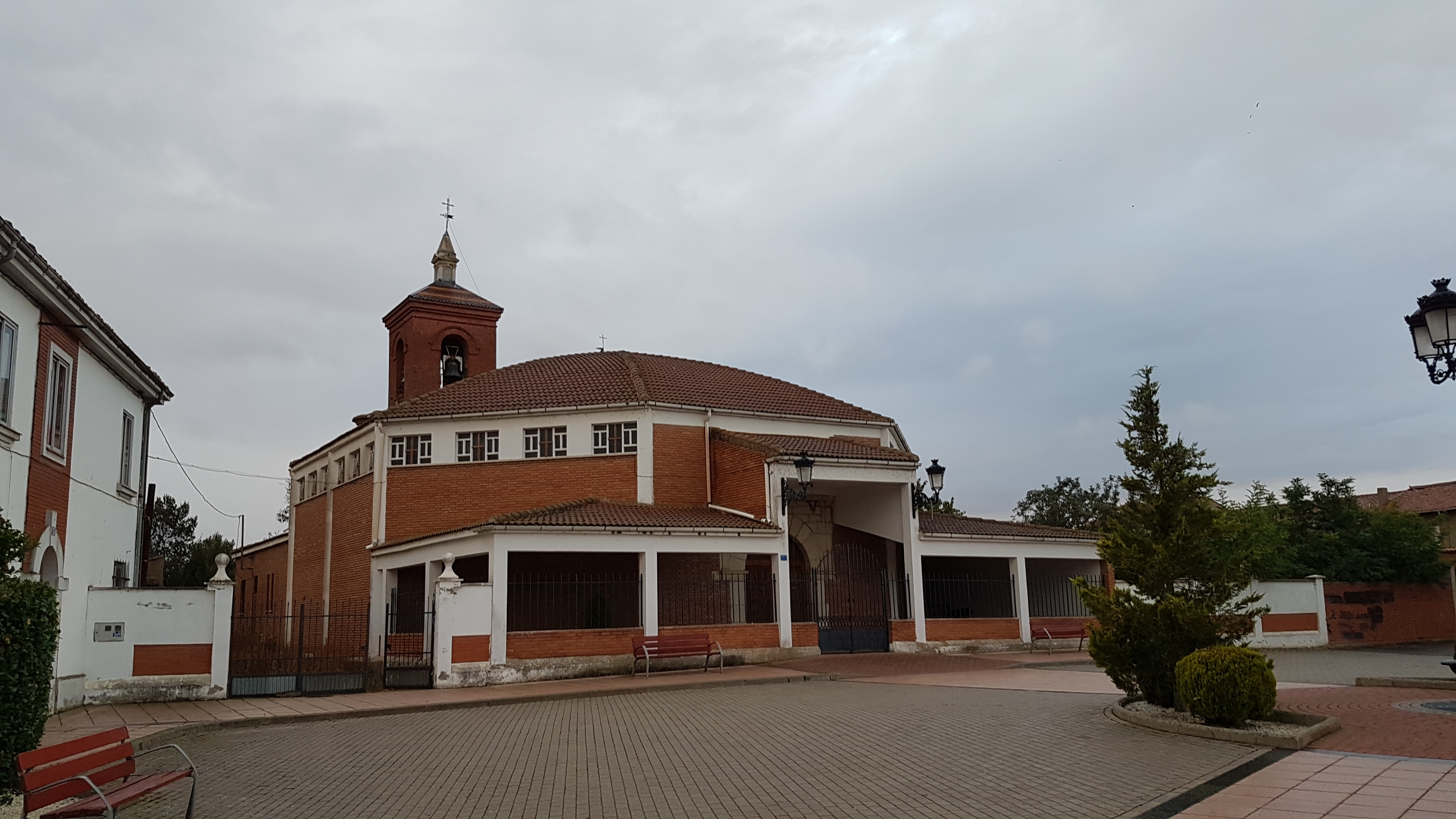
- Church of Our Lady of the Snows in Vega de Infanzones

- Flag
- Interactive map of Vega de Infanzones
- Country: Spain
- Autonomous community: Castile and León
- Province: León
- Municipality: Vega de Infanzones

Area
  - Total: 20 km^{2} (7.7 sq mi)

Population (2025-01-01)
  - Total: 837
  - Density: 42/km^{2} (110/sq mi)
- Time zone: UTC+1 (CET)
  - Summer (DST): UTC+2 (CEST)

Vega de Infanzones (Spanish pronunciation: [ˈbeɣa ðejɱfanˈθones]; Leonese: Veiga d'Infanzones) is a municipality located in the province of León, Castile and León, Spain. According to the 2025 census (INE), the municipality has a population of 837 inhabitants.
