= Sena de Luna =

Coordinates: 42°54′N 5°57′W

Sena de Luna, Spain
- municipality
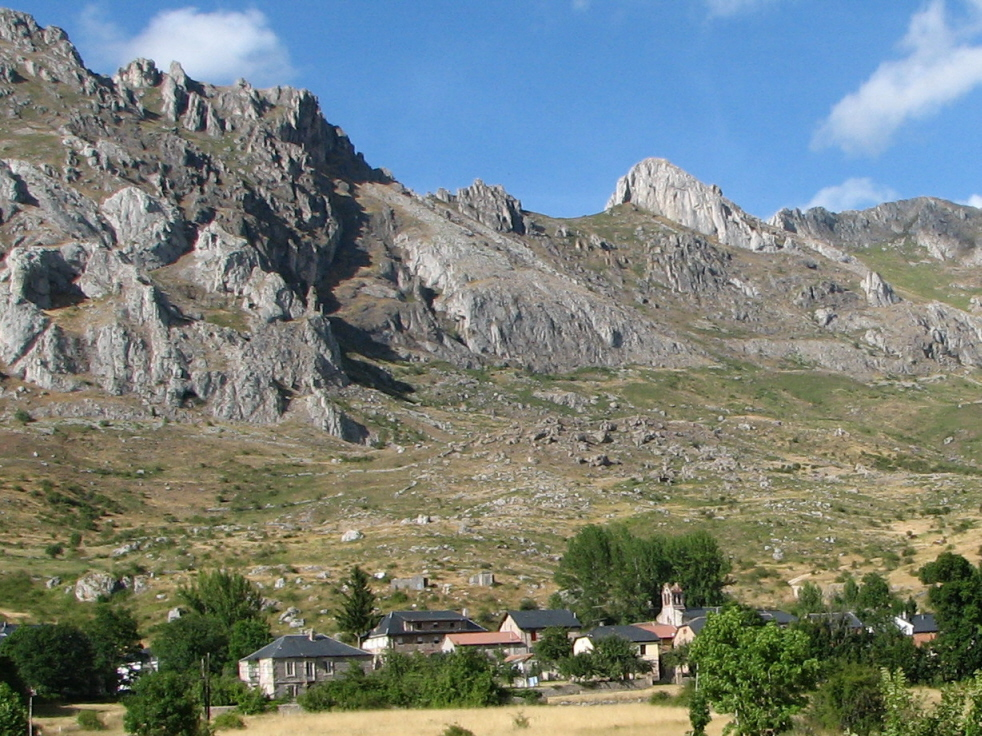
- Partial view of Sena de Luna.

- Coat of arms
- Interactive map of Sena de Luna, Spain
- Country: Spain
- Autonomous community: Castile and León
- Province: León
- Municipality: Sena de Luna

Area
  - Total: 147 km^{2} (57 sq mi)

Population (2025-01-01)
  - Total: 373
  - Density: 2.54/km^{2} (6.57/sq mi)
- Time zone: UTC+1 (CET)
  - Summer (DST): UTC+2 (CEST)

Sena de Luna is a municipality located in the province of León, Castile and León, Spain. According to the 2004 census (INE), the municipality has a population of 450 inhabitants.
