= Montes de León =

Mountain range in northwest Spain

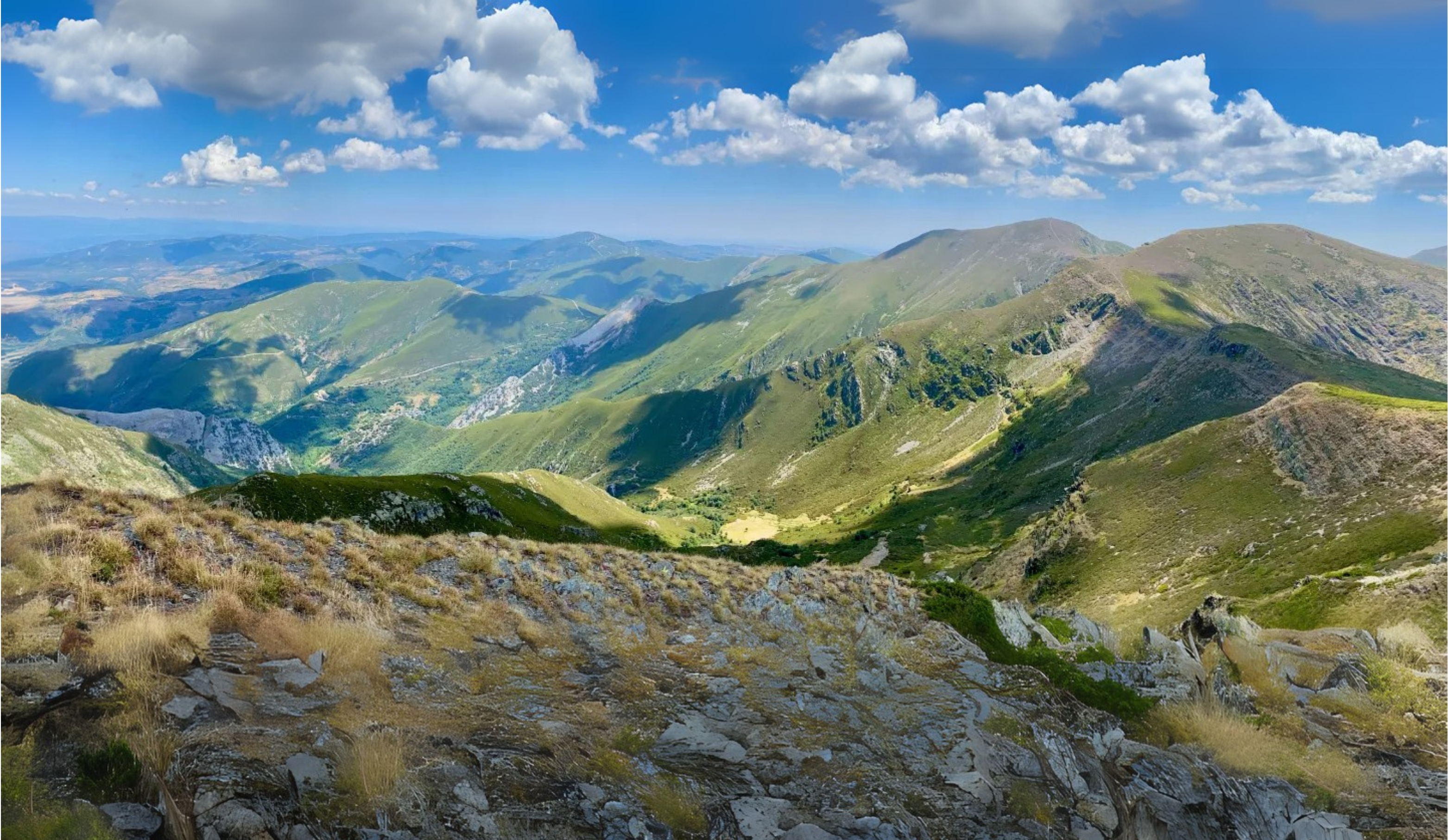
- Cabeza de la Yegua (2142 m)

Highest point
- Peak: Teleno
- Elevation: 2,188 m (7,178 ft)
- Coordinates: 42°30′N 06°18′W

Geography
- Location within Spain
- Country: Spain
- Communities: Castile and León
- Parent range: Macizo Galaico-Leonés

The Montes de León (Spanish for "mountains of León", named after the ancient Kingdom of León) is a mountain range in north-western Spain, in the provinces of León, Zamora and Ourense. This range is located at the confluence of the Cantabrian Mountains and the Macizo Galaico. The summits of the range are often covered with snow in the winter.

The highest peak is Teleno, at 2,188 metres (7,178 ft). Other important summits are Cabeza de la Yegua 2,142 metres (7,028 ft), Peña Trevinca 2,124 metres (6,969 ft) and Vizcodillo 2,121 metres (6,959 ft).

The Montes Aquilanos and the Sierra de la Cabrera are subranges of the Montes de León.

== See also ==
- Cantabrian Mountains
- Cave of Valporquero (in the Montes de León range)
- Galician Massif
