= Vegacervera =

Coordinates: 42°53′N 5°32′W

- municipality
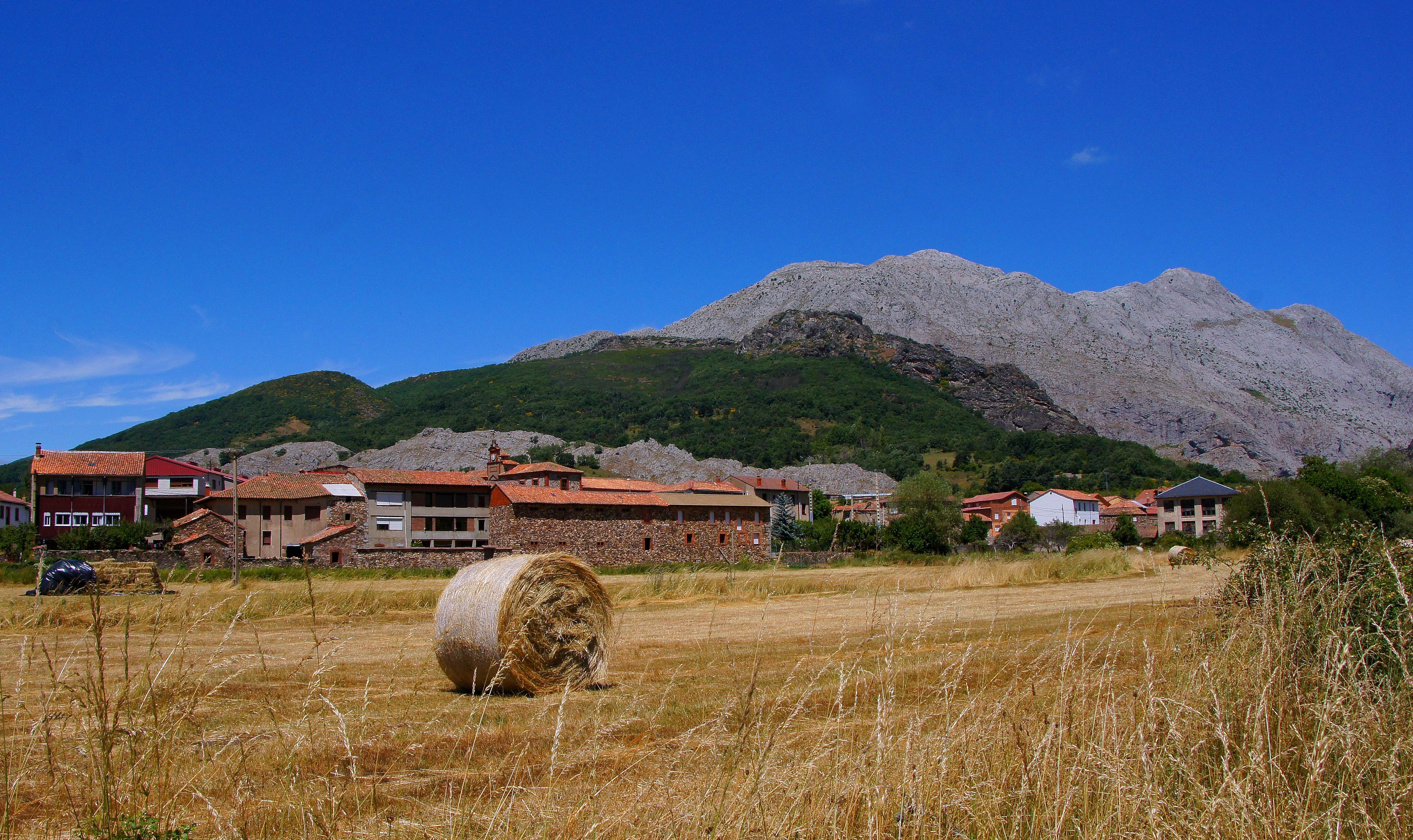
- Interactive map of Vegacervera
- Country: Spain
- Autonomous community: Castile and León
- Province: León
- Municipality: Vegacervera

Area
  - Total: 34 km^{2} (13 sq mi)

Population (2025-01-01)
  - Total: 246
  - Density: 7.2/km^{2} (19/sq mi)
- Time zone: UTC+1 (CET)
  - Summer (DST): UTC+2 (CEST)

Vegacervera (Veigacerveira in Leonese language) is a municipality located in the province of León, Castile and León, Spain. According to the 2025 census (INE), the municipality has a population of 246 inhabitants.

The Hoces de Vegacervera is a natural landscape, which takes its name from the municipality. It is protected as an Espacio natural and a Special Area of Conservation. Wildlife includes the rare Kerry slug.

== See also ==
- Province of León
- Montes de León
- Cave of Valporquero
