= Villamanín =

Coordinates: 42°56′N 5°39′W

Villamanín, Spain
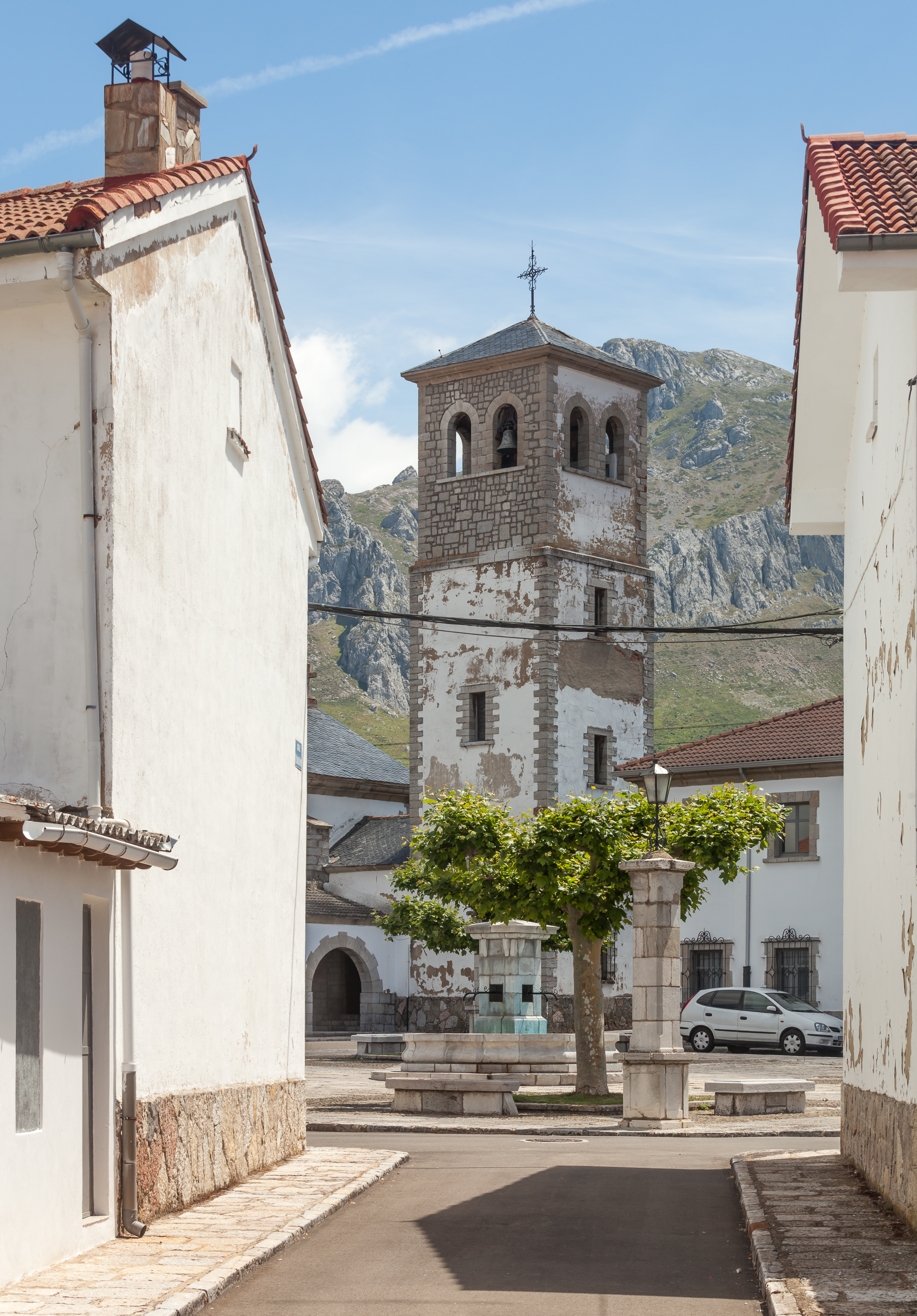
- Bell tower of the church of Villamanín de la Tercia, León, Spain

- Flag Coat of arms
- Interactive map of Villamanín, Spain
- Country: Spain
- Autonomous community: Castile and León
- Province: León
- Municipality: Villamanín

Area
  - Total: 176.25 km^{2} (68.05 sq mi)
- Elevation: 1,140 m (3,740 ft)

Population (2025-01-01)
  - Total: 863
  - Density: 4.90/km^{2} (12.7/sq mi)
- Time zone: UTC+1 (CET)
  - Summer (DST): UTC+2 (CEST)

Villamanín is a municipality located in the province of León, Castile and León, Spain. According to the 2004 census (INE), the municipality has a population of 1,161 inhabitants.

== List of settlements included in the municipality ==
- Arbas del Puerto
- Barrio de la Tercia
- Busdongo de Arbas
- Camplongo de la Tercia
- Casares de Arbas
- Cubillas de Arbas
- Fontún de la Tercia
- Golpejar de la Tercia
- Millaro de la Tercia
- Pendilla de Arbas
- Poladura de la Tercia
- Rodiezmo de la Tercia
- San Martín de la Tercia
- Tonín de Arbas
- Velilla de la Tercia
- Ventosilla de la Tercia
- Viadangos de Arbas
- Villamanín de la Tercia
- Villanueva de la Tercia
