= Minor local entity =

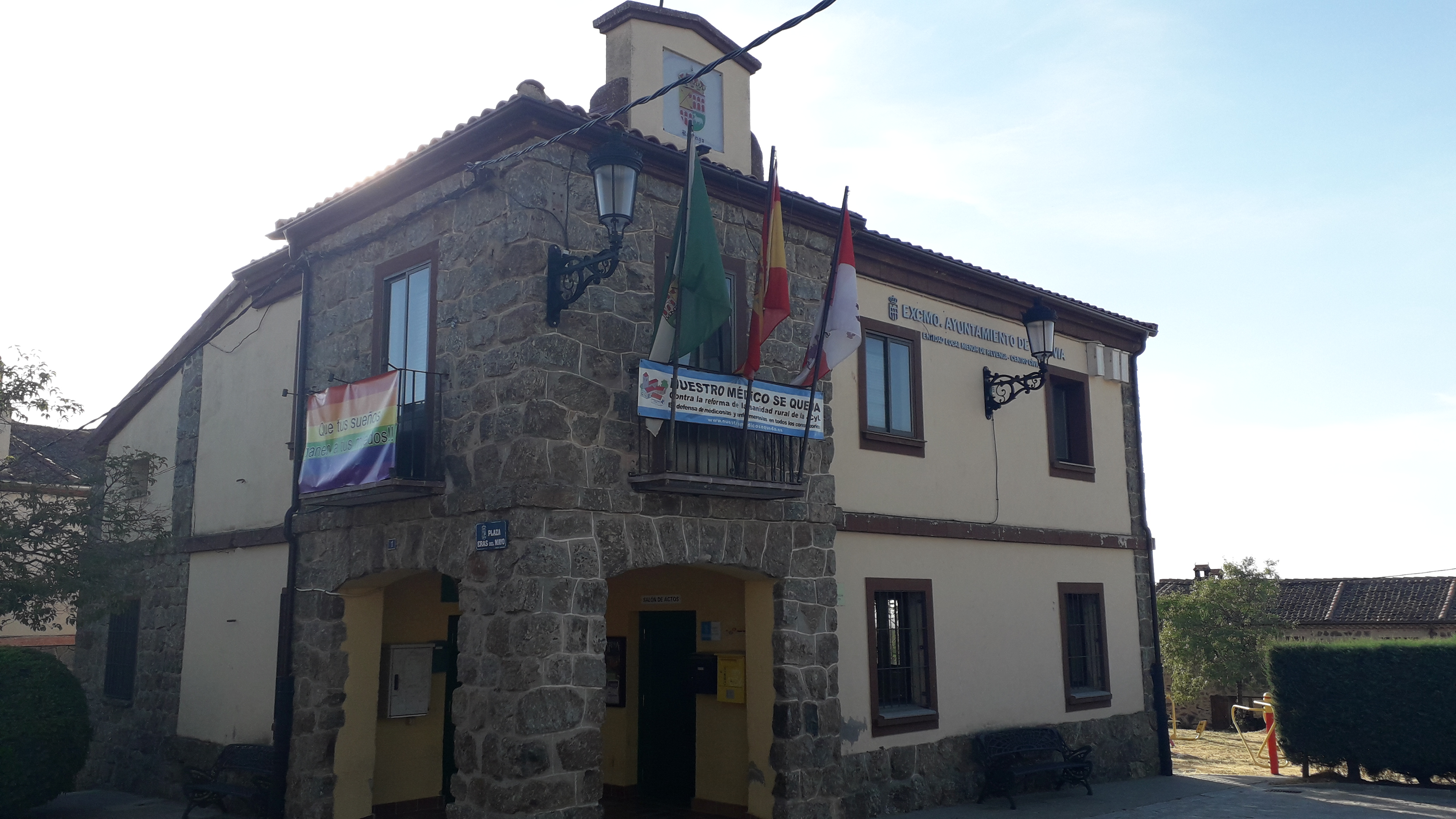

In some communities of Spain, minor local entity (Spanish: Entidad de Ámbito Territorial Inferior al Municipio EATIM) is a territorial entity of scope smaller than municipality defined and regulated by the regional governments.

Some examples are caseríos, parroquias, aldeas, barrios, anteiglesias, concejos, pedanías, lugares anejos, decentralised municipal entity (Catalan: entitat municipal descentralitzada (EMD)) in Catalonia, autonomous local entity (Spanish: entidad local autónoma) in Andalucía, rural parish (Spanish: parroquia rural) in Asturias.

The administration of these entities have various names including an concejo abierto, a single person mayor called Alcalde pedáneo and a rural council (Spanish: junta vecinal) and councils of Álava.

There are almost 4,000 minor local entities; most of them (2,226) are to be found in the autonomous community of Castilla y Leon.

== See also ==
- Local government in Spain

== Bibliography ==
- "Local Government Act (Organic Law 7/1985)" (in Spanish). Agencia Estatal Boletín Oficial del Estado. 1985.
- "Local Government in Spain" (PDF). Ministry of Public Administration.
