= Omana (disambiguation) =

Omaña is a comarca in Castille and León, Spain.

Omana or Omaña may also refer to:

- Omana, a 1972 Indian Malayalam language film
- Alejandra Omaña, Colombian senator
- Omana Gopalakrishnan, an Indian translator of Russian books into Malayalam
- Sohar, the town of Omana mentioned by Pliny the Elder
- Omaña River, a river in Castille and León
- Las Omañas, municipality in Castille and León
