= Omaña =

Comarca in Castile and León, Spain

Coordinates: 42°51′N 6°11′W

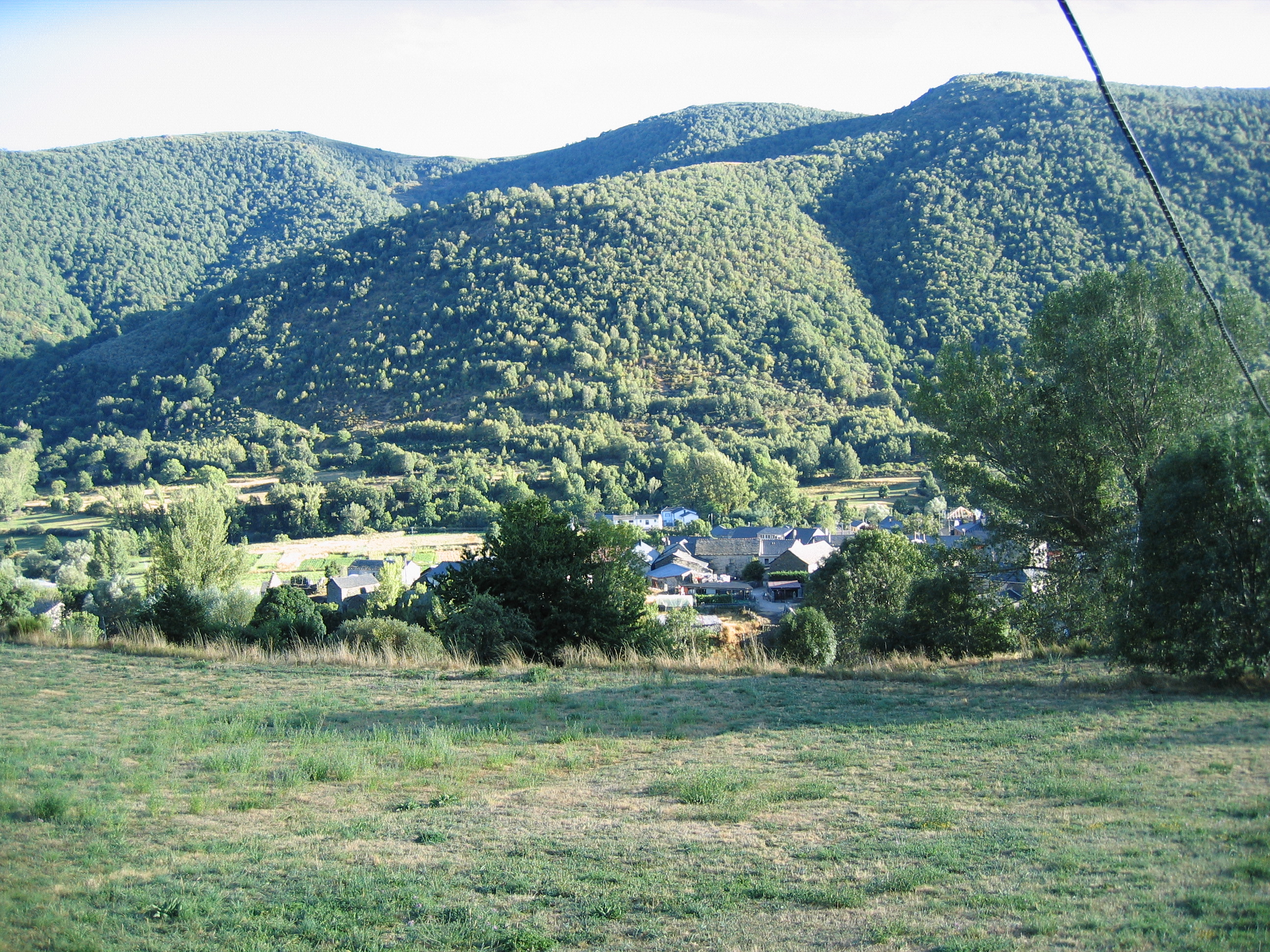
Typical Omañese landscape with mountains and valleys

Omaña is a comarca of the province of León, autonomous community of Castile and León, in Spain. It is a historical region without administrative recognition. The traditional capital of the region is Murias de Paredes, which was the head of the judicial district until well into the 20th century. Omaña is formed by the municipalities of Soto y Amío, (Note: Geographically, the municipality of Soto and Amío is located between Omaña and Luna.) Murias de Paredes, Riello and Valdesamario. Although sometimes the municipality Las Omañas is considered part of Omaña, others place it, due to its physical character, on the Ribera del Órbigo.

== Etymology ==
The toponym "Omaña"—Oumaña in Leonese—comes from, the name given to the by the Romans inhabitants of this area: homus manium or "god men," for their hardness and resilience; This interpretation is doubtful, since the expression homus manium is not correct in Latin and is not consistent with other toponyms with the same roots. Other more rigorous etymological analyzes from the linguistic and historical points of view, they conclude that the name of the region comes from Aqua Mania or of Aqua Magna—"great water," great river— which would be the old name of the river that runs through it; That is to say, the river lent its name to the region and not the other way around.

== History ==
=== Ancient history ===
Although not many details are known about the ancient history of Omaña, the human presence seems to go back at least as far as the Bronze Age, judging by the archaeological finds of the region, among which are the cauldron of Villaceid, the idol of Rodicol and several bronze axes. Castros are numerous in the area. The Castro culture is associated with the astures, although many were used during the Roman occupation as bases to organize the intense mining exploitation of the area that took place at this time. As testimony of gold exploitation, there are traces of canals in Valdesamario and Valle Gordo, land clearings and removed sands in la Garandilla, Guisatecha, and Barrio de la Puente and remains of two branches of the Asturian Rodera, one that passed through Ponjos and Rosales and another that passed through Garandilla, Home, Castro, and Riello.

=== Middle ages ===
The absence of important population centers that could serve as basis for the effective domination of the population, together with the presence of ancient defensive structures, progress has been made as explanation of the resistance of this area to Muslim rule.

In any case, this circumstance was key for the defense of the new Kingdom of Asturias and the subsequent conquest of the territories of the Duero basin. From this time onwards, references began to be made to current populations, from Omaña, such as Vega de Arenza (Vegarienza), Murias de Paredes and Ameo (Amío) already in the 9th century. The name Omania or Ommania or land of Omania appears in documents from 1154.

=== 19th and 20th century ===
The political changes of the 19th century had little impact on Omaña, apart from the successive recompositions of its councils, grouped already in the middle of the century into municipalitiess; These adjustments in territorial administration were sometimes criticized as useless and disrespectful of traditional uses. No administration managed to implement positive policies for the region, which began to find itself increasingly marginalized. This situation led to the gradual depopulation of the territory due to emigration starting at the beginning of the 20th century; emigration accelerated in the second half of the same century, especially after the implementation of the Stabilization Plan of 1959, which sharpened the contrast between the way of life of Omaña, in many respects similar to that of several centuries. behind, and the progressive prosperity of other Spanish regions. It was not until the declaration as a "Special Action Region" in Royal Decree 3418 of December 29, 1978, that an effort was made to improve the infrastructure, measures that however arrived late to stop the depopulation process. .

== Physical geography ==
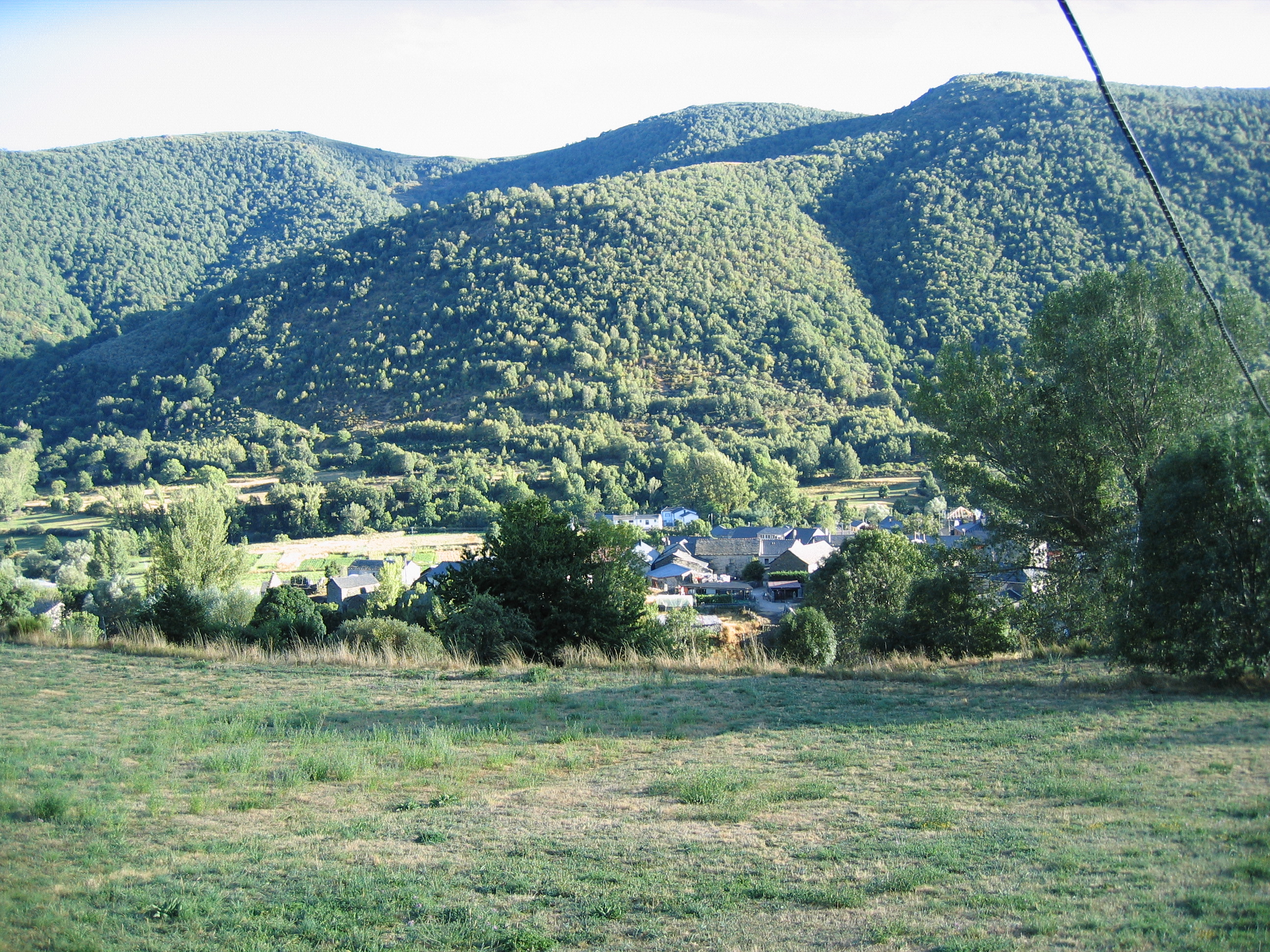
A part of the region has been declared as Place of Community Importance, Natural Area and SPA (Special Protection Area for Birds).

Omaña is located in a mountainous area, on the southern limit of the Cantabrian Mountains and the northeastern limit of the Montes de León. The zone status border between two mountain systems and transition between lands of the northern subplateau and the Cantabrian mountain range provide it with a special interest.

Omaña is separated from most of the neighboring regions by mountain ranges. On the border with Babia, to the north, are the Alto de la Cañada and the Sierra de la Filera. To the south it borders la Cepeda and Boeza, highlighting the peaks of Pozo Fierro, el Suspiron and Arcos del Agua. To the west and northwest, the Fasgarón, the Nevadín, the Tambarón and Piedra Negra separate it from Laciana and the region of the High Sil. To the east and southeast, the terrain slopes more gently towards the Luna and the land of Ordás. The transition between the western elevations and the river valleys that extend towards the southeast is produced by a set of medium-altitude reliefs, formed by ancient erosion processes and called "panda mountain ranges"; The Cueto Rosales lies in one of these chordals, near the geographical center of Oman, and from its summit most of the county and its boundaries can be seen.

The county shares its name with the Omaña River, which constitutes its main axis. Around the valley of the Omaña are arranged the different valleys which compose the county, following the ancient network of fractures hercynics in northwest-southeast direction: El Valle Gordo, the Valle Chico, La Lomba and Valdesamario—occupied by the rivers Vallegordo, Sabugo River, Negro River and Valdesamario or Ponjos respectively— as well as the narrow valleys of the northern slope of the Omaña, all with a physical character of their own. A short distance from the mouth of the Valdesamario, the Omaña joins the Luna River in the municipality of las Omañas; Here the river valley widens considerably and the terrain takes on a more pronounced plain character, now being considered part of the Ribera del Órbigo.

=== Climate ===
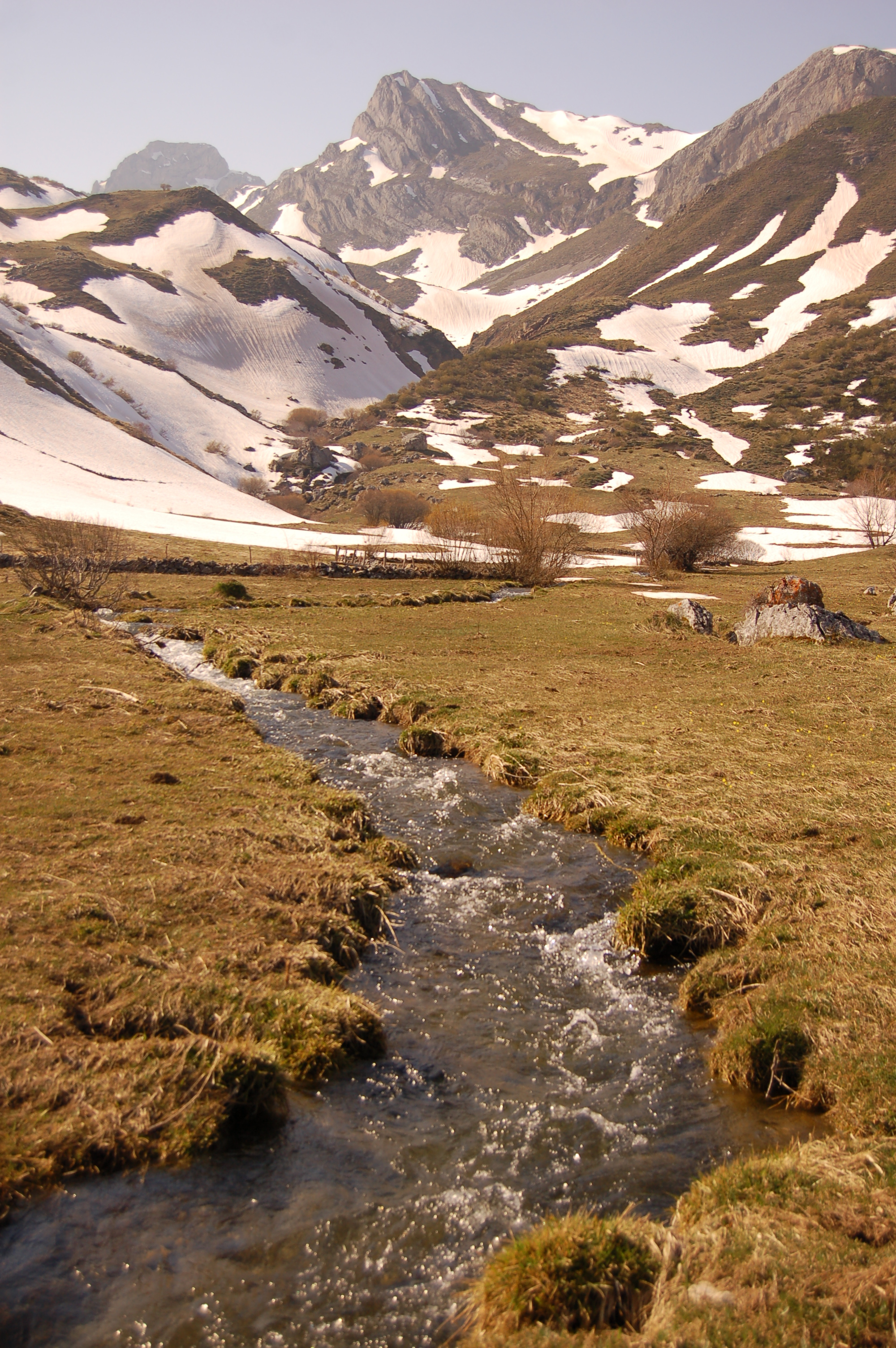
Valley in Omaña at the beginning of spring. Winters in Omaña are long with abundant snowfall

The mountainous character of Omaña largely determines its climate, classified as continentalized Mediterranean, with winters cold and frequent frosts, and summers warm and dry. The annual thermal oscillation is around 15 °C while the daily temperature sometimes exceeds 20 °C. precipitation is distributed irregularly throughout the year, being scarcer in summer and concentrating at the end of autumn, in the winter months and at the beginning of spring.

According to Köppen climate classification, this comarca is in mild summer zone, that is, a transitional climate between the Mediterranean climate(Csa) and the oceanic climate (Cfb), with the average of the warmest month below 22 °C but above 10 °C for five or more months, and characterized by average annual temperatures below 9 °C, rainfall close to 1000 mm annually, winter snowfall and dry summers.

=== Access ===
The LE-493 highway crosses the region; Small regional roads connect this main axis with the different towns. The main access routes to Omaña are, from the east, the highway AP-66 or the CL-623 highway (León-Villablino), taking the LE-493 in the town La Magdalena. To the west, it is reached from Villablino, on the CL-631, through the Puerto de la Magdalena.

The closest airport is León, about 50 km.

== Administration ==
The towns of Omaña are small and located within a short distance between them. This type of dispersed population is common to the entire area from the mountain of León. Each valley has a few villages, generally three to five, which are usually grouped under the same municipality. The number of populations grouped in a municipality (or, formerly, a council) varies quite a bit. For example, in the 19th century, Lomba de Campestedo had 7 towns, while that in the Council of Omaña there were 21. Throughout history, the municipalities that make up the region have experienced quite a few reorganizations. At the end of the 20th century, Riello became the municipality with greater number of towns, 31 in total, when Campo de la Lomba and Vegarienza merged with it.

Society in Omaña is fundamentally agrarian society. The administration of the different population units of the region was traditionally based on the open council formed by the neighbors. Village councils used to take place at the church entrance, summoned by a special ringing of the bell. In these meetings, the ordinancess and the uses and customs of the town were applied: issues concerning the herding of livestock, the use of communal lands and irrigation water were decided; facenderas or "hacenderas" were called to repair roads, fountains and bridges; Contraventions of the ordinances were judged and fines were imposed. (Note: Fines were frequently paid in wine; Here is an example taken from the ordinances of Rosales:«And we also ordered that no person may graze oxen or other livestock among the loaves, after it gets dark, or in other people's meadows, penalty of half a jug of wine for the said Council.) In the town ordinances of the 17th and 19th centuries there was a marked primacy of collective interests over individual rights. During the 20th century, the peculiar social organization of the region was lost along with the traditional ways of subsistence, in decline due to the low profitability of minifundistas farms in a modern economy, and the subsequent depopulation of the area, which accelerates from the 60s onwards.

== Demographics ==
Historical population

Year	Pop.	±%
1857	9,820	—
1877	9,935	+1.2%
1897	10,921	+9.9%
1910	10,756	−1.5%
1920	10,644	−1.0%

Year	Pop.	±%
1930	9,385	−11.8%
1940	8,964	−4.5%
1950	9,752	+8.8%
1960	8,517	−12.7%
1970	6,039	−29.1%

Year	Pop.	±%
1981	3,854	−36.2%
1991	3,586	−7.0%
2001	2,972	−17.1%
2011	2,395	−19.4%
2021	1,948	−18.7%

- 1857–1991: De facto population according to the population censuses of the INE of Riello, Murias de Paredes, Campo de la Lomba, Vegarienza, Soto y Amío and Valdesamario.
- 2001–2021: Population according to the ratio of population units of the INE of Riello, Murias de Paredes, Soto and Amio and Valdesamario.

The region had almost 11,000 inhabitants at the beginning of the 20th century. From then on, the population began to emigrate, mostly to Argentina, Brazil and Venezuela at the beginning, and to Europe and other regions of Spain and the province of León as the century progressed. The 1986 census already counted only 4,000 inhabitants. But by 2011, the population dropped to 2400. Emigration has led not only to the depopulation of the region, but also to the aging of the population, since mainly young people emigrate, which hinders the prospects for recovery.

== Geology ==
An important part of the terrain of the Omaña basin is constituted by slates and schists Precambrians; in areas of the north, northwest and south of the county are quartzites, sandstones and slates of Cambrian and Ordovician origin. The southern limit between Precambrian and Cambrian rocks runs along the imaginary line that joins the towns of Posada de Omaña and Inicio; in this strip, the formation of Vegadeo limestone can be seen, with a high participation of carbonates. The reddish limestones and marbles found in Fasgar and Rosales correspond to the upper levels of this formation.Copper and gold minerals of low economic value have been found.

Arranged on the oldest rocks, outcrops of the Carboniferous are found in two areas:

1. to the north, in Manzaneda de Omaña and Sosas del Cumbral, possibly part of the deposit from the Stephanian period that extends between La Magdalena and Villablino.
2. to the south, in the Valdesamario valley; the latter can be highlighted for the economic importance of its coal deposits and for the presence of a site of fossilplants, discovered in 2006. (Note: This site was looted in 2010.)

The glacial deposits are of little importance, concentrating near the Suspiran, in the Valle Gordo and on the western limits of the region, where glacial processes have shaped the valleys of Campo de Santiago and Fasgarón and Vivero, at the foot of the Nevadín. A notable geological event today is the river capture by the Sil River basin, which has a greater slope and has a greater erosive capacity; this turns out evident in the Puerto de la Magdalena, and in the municipality of Murias de Ponjos, municipality of Valdesamario. The same phenomenon is observed at the head of the Luna River in Laciana.

== Flora and fauna ==
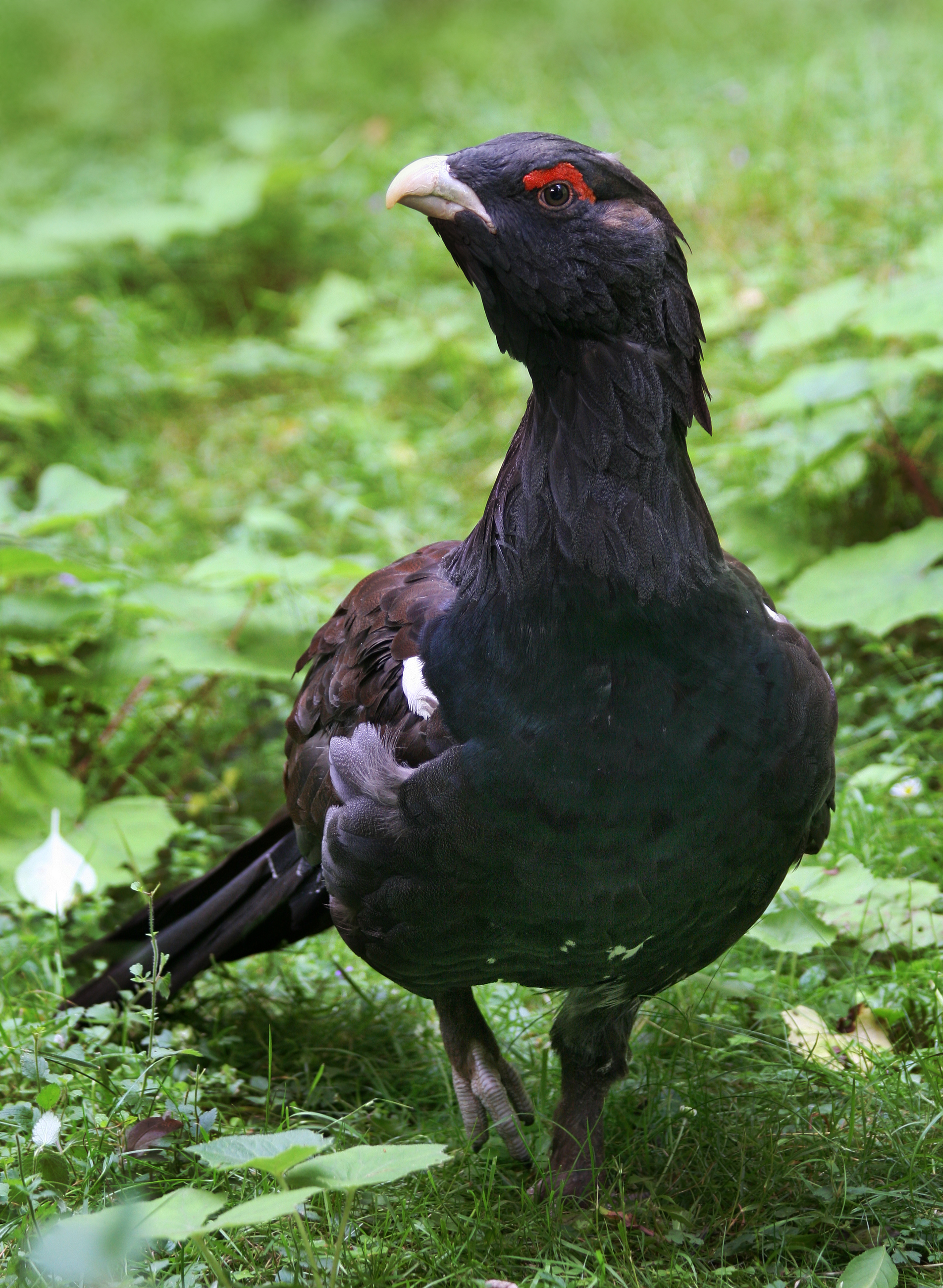
The Cantabrian capercaillie, a threatened species in Omaña and Valdesamario

Omaña forms part of the Omaña and Luna Valleys Biosphere Reserve A part of the region has been declared as Site of Community Importance, Natural Area and SPA (Special Protection Area for Birds).

At the highest levels there is typical scrub vegetation, with an abundance of piornos (brooms) and urces or heathers. This type of vegetation tends to occupy abandoned ancient lands.u High mountain meadows (brañas) traditionally dedicated to pastures are also characteristic of the area. Cabbage trees (Quercus pyrenaica) cover large areas of land. On the valley floor area there are many elders, Sambucus ebulus and alders. Birch trees are also characteristic of the region.

Among the animal species that may be mentioned roe deer, wild boar, golden eagle and peregrine falcon, singular species such as the Iberian wolf, the Iberian desman, the red-backed shrike and grey partridge, and endemic species of the northwestern mountain, such as the broom hare. The common trout is abundant in the Omaña and is also found in its tributaries. Omaña is part of the territory of two important species threatened: the brown bear and the Cantabrian capercaillie. Although large areas of the region constitute ideal habitat for capercaillie, the construction of wind farms is considered a significant threat to the recovery of this species in the area.

== Economy ==
Formerly flax was grown for making fabrics. The linares were located in the most fertile irrigated lands, located at the bottom of the valleys. The dryland farming lands on the slopes are dedicated themselves to the cultivation of cereals, mainly rye. The difference from the linear ones and the orchards, divided into smallholdings, centennial lands were open plots distributed in leaves to group the sown lands and be able to let livestock graze on the fallow. In this way the maximum yield of the land was obtained.

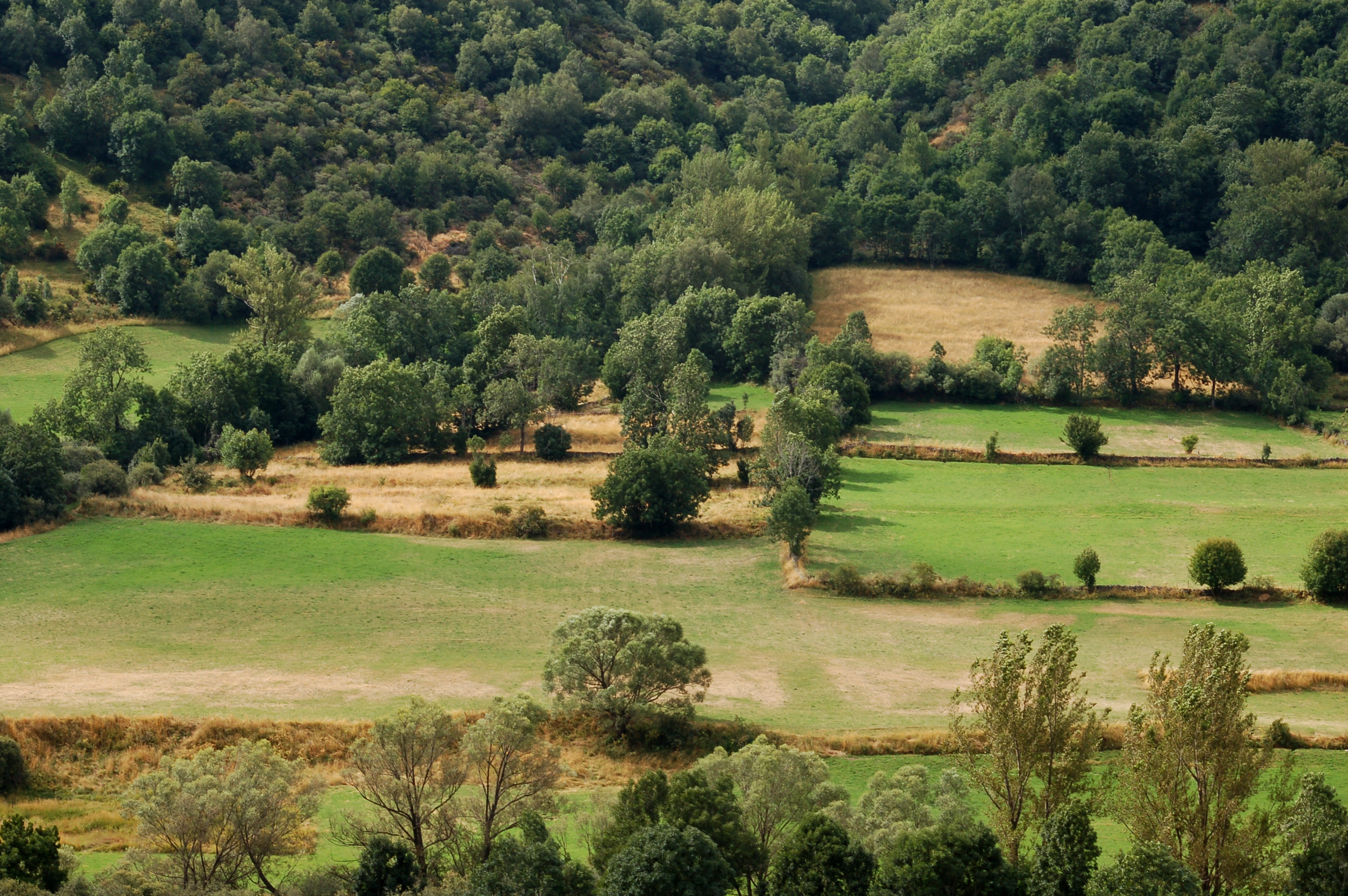
Cultivated plots. Small delimited plots constitute the most common type of agricultural exploitation in Omaña.

The uncultivated lands, located in the mountain areas, provided stones and wood for the construction of homes and objects for daily use and also pasture for major and minor livestock. These lands used to be communal and their exploitation was regulated by council ordinances. Irrigated meadows at lower elevations provided grass to feed livestock during the winter.

Omaña's economy is based on agropastroral activities. The proportion of land cultivated in the 1950s, a time where the traditional economy of self-sufficiency still existed, it was around 14% of the regional surface. These lands are concentrated in the surroundings of population centers. The Garden products (legumes, cabbage and potatoes) are mainly dedicated to self-consumption. Livestock farming has traditionally been the main source of income for the inhabitants of the region, who sold butter, wool and fattened animals for the market. In exchange, the inhabitants acquired sugar. wine and other items that were not produced in Omaña. Commercial activities took place mainly in the markets of Riello and el Castillo and Murias de Paredes, although the inhabitants also traveled to San Emiliano and Villablino, outside the region. Sometimes longer trips were undertaken, to Astorga or Villamañán. Commercial exchanges have acquired greater importance as communications and means of transportation have improved. In the second half of the 20th century, the exploitation of the coal mines of Laciana, Luna and Valdesamario also It became an important activity, if not enough to stop the process of emigration, at least to improve the economy of the remaining inhabitants. Unfortunately, the mining sector also entered into crisis towards the end of the 20th century.

Currently, depopulation has meant the abandonment of many arable lands, especially in the case of crops intended for self-consumption. The cultivation of rye has disappeared and the most fertile lands are usually dedicated to the production of grass for the livestock herd, which, even diminished by depopulation, continues to be an important part of economic activity in the area. In the first decade of the 21st century the rural tourism sector has begun to take off, benefiting from the designation of Omaña as Biosphere Reserve. Another positive factor for tourism was the abandonment of a plan to dam the Omaña River in 1993; This has cleared up uncertainties about the future of Riello and other surrounding towns that would have been flooded, and which until then had represented a brake on investments in this area. The wind farms, although very controversial due to their possible ecological impact, also represent a source of income for the municipalities where they are installed.

== Culture ==
=== Language ===
The traditional language of Omaña is Leonese (Western dialect), although in situation of diglossia compared to Spanish. (Note: Las ordenanzas de los pueblos y otros documentos escritos que se conservan de siglos pasados están redactados en castellano.) Starting in the 20th century, this last language began to impose itself in the spoken language and at the beginning of the 21st century the use of Leonese is a minority and relegated mainly to family use, although has left a clear influence on the variant of Spanish in use in the area.

Given the threat that is over the native language, there have been several efforts to study its distinctive features and compile the region's own vocabulary. César Morán Bardón was one of the first scholars to document examples of traditional speech and made a vocabulary compilation, followed by others made by various authors. Among the most recent efforts to preserve traditional speech, it is worth highlighting that of Margarita Álvarez Rodríguez who in 2010 published a complete study of phonetic, morphological and Valdesamario's own vocabulary.

=== Architecture ===
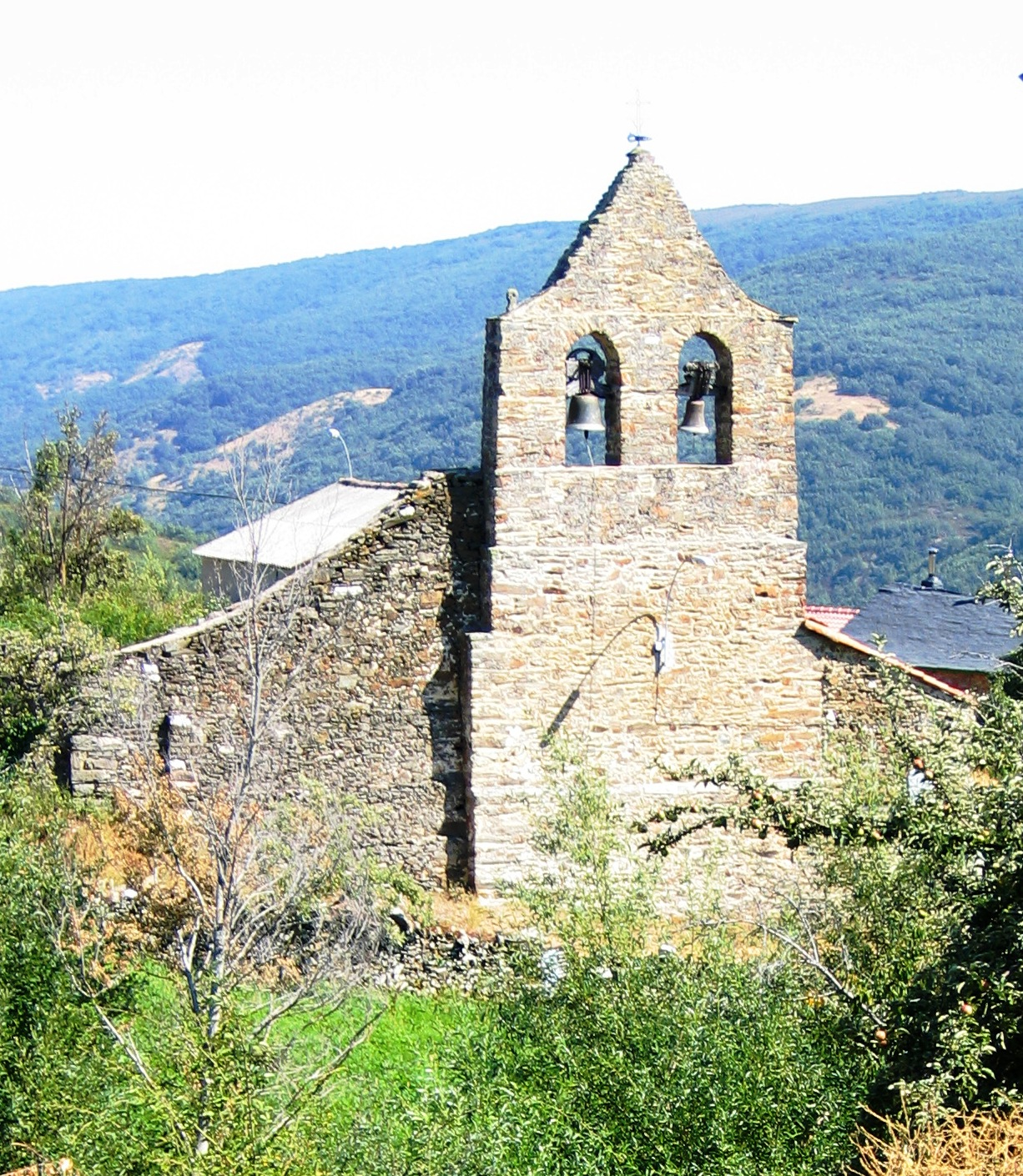
Photo of the church of Rosales (Riello)

Traditional Omañesa architecture is based on stone and wood as preferred construction materials. The houses are usually rectangular in plan, with roofs inclined, as is common in a climate where snowfall is abundant. Traditionally the roofs were covered with "coelmos" (bundles of straw from the rye crops). Thatch roofing (teito) constitutes a good thermal insulator, although it deteriorates over time and must be repaired regularly, lasting a maximum of up to 20 years. The use of fireplace with open fires for cooking carried a significant risk of fire and sometimes entire neighborhoods or towns burned. The abandonment of rye cultivation and depopulation have gradually led to the disappearance of huelmo roofs, which have been replaced by tile or slate or, in auxiliary buildings simply covered with uralite. The wood used in the construction was oak, birch or poplar. Although the style of the homes and other buildings is functional and often rustic, many examples of decorative elements can be seen, especially in the window frames and openings and the whitewashing of the walls. There are quite a few examples of facades decorated with crests family, in various states of conservation. Another architectural element to highlight are the corridors or curridores, either open or closed by glass, the latter being rarer.

The one or two storey houses are usually distributed around an interior corral. The traditional home had at least two rooms: the kitchen and the bedroom; In the kitchen there was the hearth or fireplace, located in the center or attached to a wall, and the oven for kneading bread. The most primitive buildings did not have a chimney, and the smoke dissipated through gaps in the roof. Later they began to be built in slab and, later, in brick. The stables, court (corral) and other rooms for the animals were sometimes located under the rooms of the house, to provide heat to them. The haystack was located on the upper floor, although a separate construction from the house was often dedicated to this purpose, to reduce the risk of fires.

The most prominent building in Omañesa towns is usually the church. In addition to religious services being held there, council meetings usually took place in their porches. Many are in good condition. The bell towers are in Bell-gable, with one or two bells, often of different sizes, which were used for different warnings depending on the sequence and rhythm of the chimes. Despite the simplicity of its exterior, the interiors are decorated with beautiful altarpieces, altares and carvings; the latter sometimes date from the Middle Ages.

=== Gastronomy ===
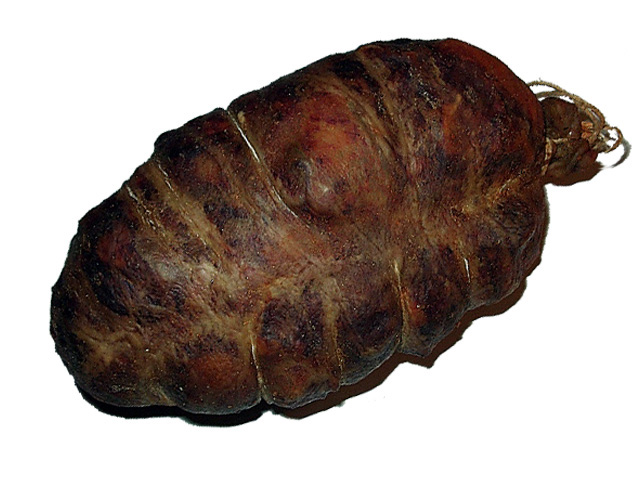
Botillo

The economy of self-sufficiency determined the food consumed by the people for much of the history of the region. The traditional diet is based on the following elements:

- Domestic livestock and its products: Milk and its derivatives, eggs and meat. Although the meat of cattle sheep, beef and Poultry was consumed on special occasions or when the accidental death of animals occurred an animal, the most consumed meat was pork, normally raised for this purpose.
- Legumes and vegetables grown in the family garden, such as potatoes, cabbages, beans, chickpea, peas, etc and fruits, cultivated or wild: apples, cherries, pears, nisos (variety of plum), chestnuts, blackberries, blueberries and Fragaria vesca. Potatoes, as they were preserved for a long time, were as important as bread or pork and were consumed with almost every meal.

Typical dishes include, among others, cocido, migas, garlic soup, trout soup, Swiss roll, the fisuelos — also called frisuelos- the miajotes, consisting of a pasta made with blackberries and bread. Also famous are the pomace liqueurs of cherries, blueberries and other fruits.

=== Festivals ===
Omaña has many popular festivals although, as is the case with numerous traditions in the region, the characteristic elements of the festivities are at risk of being lost. Many of them are religious in nature: they celebrate Christmas, the day of the Three Wise Men, Holy Week and Corpus Christi, in addition to the festivals of the saints and virgins patrons of each town. The most important religious celebration, which still has a great following, is the Romería of Pandorado, which takes place on August 15. In the pilgrimage, a procession is celebrated in which the pendons from the towns of Omaña participate.

Among the non-religious festivals, the zafarronada (carnival festival) stands out. In the zafarronada, the main personnel is the zafarrón, disguised with a sheep skin, cowbells and a ram mask; the zafarrón tours the towns accompanied by other characters such as the blind man, the blind woman, the gypsies, the bullfighter and the bull; In the past, the hustler and his entourage went from house to house, to receive some food or money; In houses where nothing was given, they threw ashes at the owners. At the end of the parade, the procession meets at Riello, where the bullfight is celebrated, and the party ends with a large bonfire. Another celebration that still has great roots is Sábado Castañero, celebrated in Saturday before Christmas.
