= Suero de Quiñones =

Spanish knight

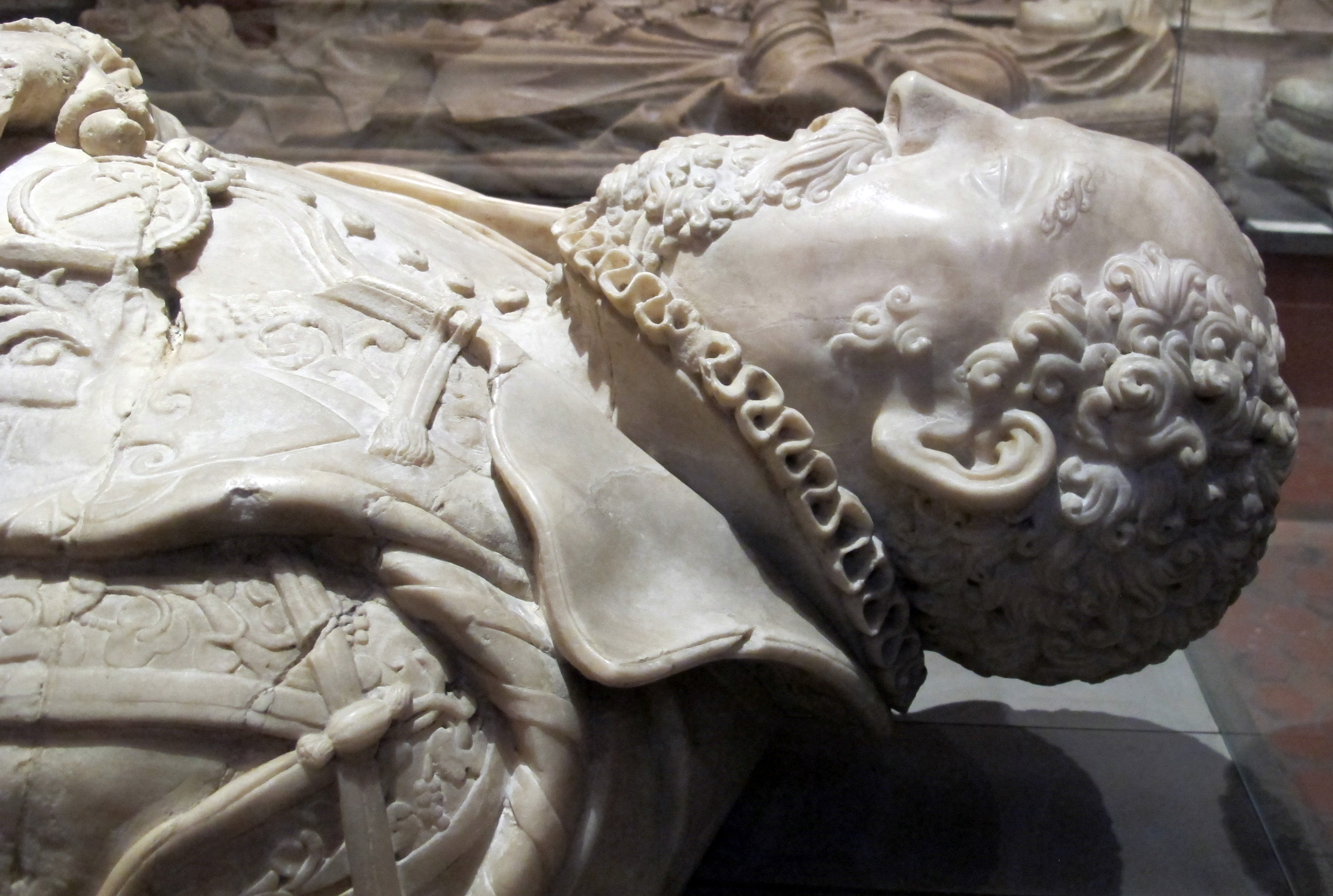
Sculpture from the 16th-century sarcophagus of Suero de Quiñones by Pompeo Leoni

Suero de Quiñones (c. 1409 – 11 July 1456), called El del Passo ("he of the pass"), was a Leonese knight, nobleman, and author in the Kingdom of León (then part of the Crown of Castile). He gained fame for his Paso Honroso, a pas d'armes (passage of arms), at the Órbigo River in 1434.

== Early life ==
Suero was born in 1409 in the Kingdom of León, the second of ten children of wealthy Leonese landowner Diego Fernández de Quiñones, known as El Afortunado (The Fortunate One) and scion of the House of Quiñones, and his wife María de Toledo.

By the 1420s, Suero and his elder brother Pedro de Quiñones were active participants in Castilian political life as members of the court of Constable of Castile Álvaro de Luna.

== Adulthood ==
In 1431, Suero participated in Battle of La Higueruela, during which the forces of John II of Castile, led by Álvaro de Luna, attempted to take Granada as part of the Spanish Reconquista.

=== Paso Honoroso ===
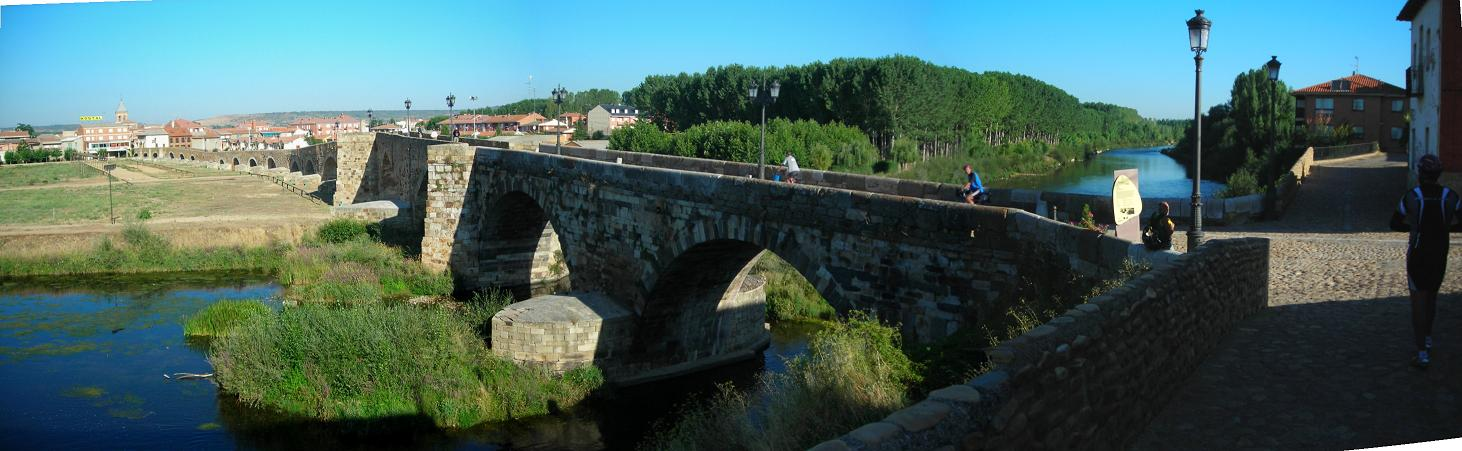
Bridge over the Órbigo River where Suero de Quiñones and his men maintained their position.

Suero's renown grew in 1434, when he established the Paso Honoroso, a pas d'armes (passage of arms), at the Hospital de Órbigo over the Órbigo River in 1434. From July 10 to August 9, Suero and ten companions encamped in a field beside the bridge over the Órbigo River, in the northwest of Castile. They challenged each knight who wished to cross the bridge to a joust. This road was on the Camino de Santiago, a pilgrimage route leading to the shrine to Saint James the Great at Santiago de Compostela. At this point in the summer, thousands of pilgrims from across Europe would cross the bridge. Suero and his men swore to "break 300 lances" before moving from the spot. After 166 battles, Suero and his men were so injured they could not continue and declared the mission complete.

Town notary Don Luis Alonso Luengo kept a detailed first-hand chronicle of the events, later published as Libro del Passo honroso ("Book of the Passage of Honor"), bringing Suero and his men even wider fame in Europe.

=== Later years ===
In 1449, to avoid paying off a debt to a Jewish lender, Suero reportedly rallied the Christian population of León against the city's Jews, inspired by the claim that the Jews were collectively responsible for Jesus's death. On Maundy Thursday and Good Friday, Suero and his companions attacked the Jewish quarter and killed many Jews, including the lender to whom Suero owed money. To celebrate the pogrom, Suero and his supporters drank wine. According to Margarita Torres, this incident may be the root of the matar judíos tradition in Spain, whereby revelers drink Leonese lemonade during Holy Week.

== Legacy ==
Suero became legendary in Spanish history and was mentioned by protagonist Don Quixote de la Mancha in the legendary 1605 Spanish novel Don Quixote by Miguel de Cervantes.
