= Omaña River =

Tributary of the Órbigo River

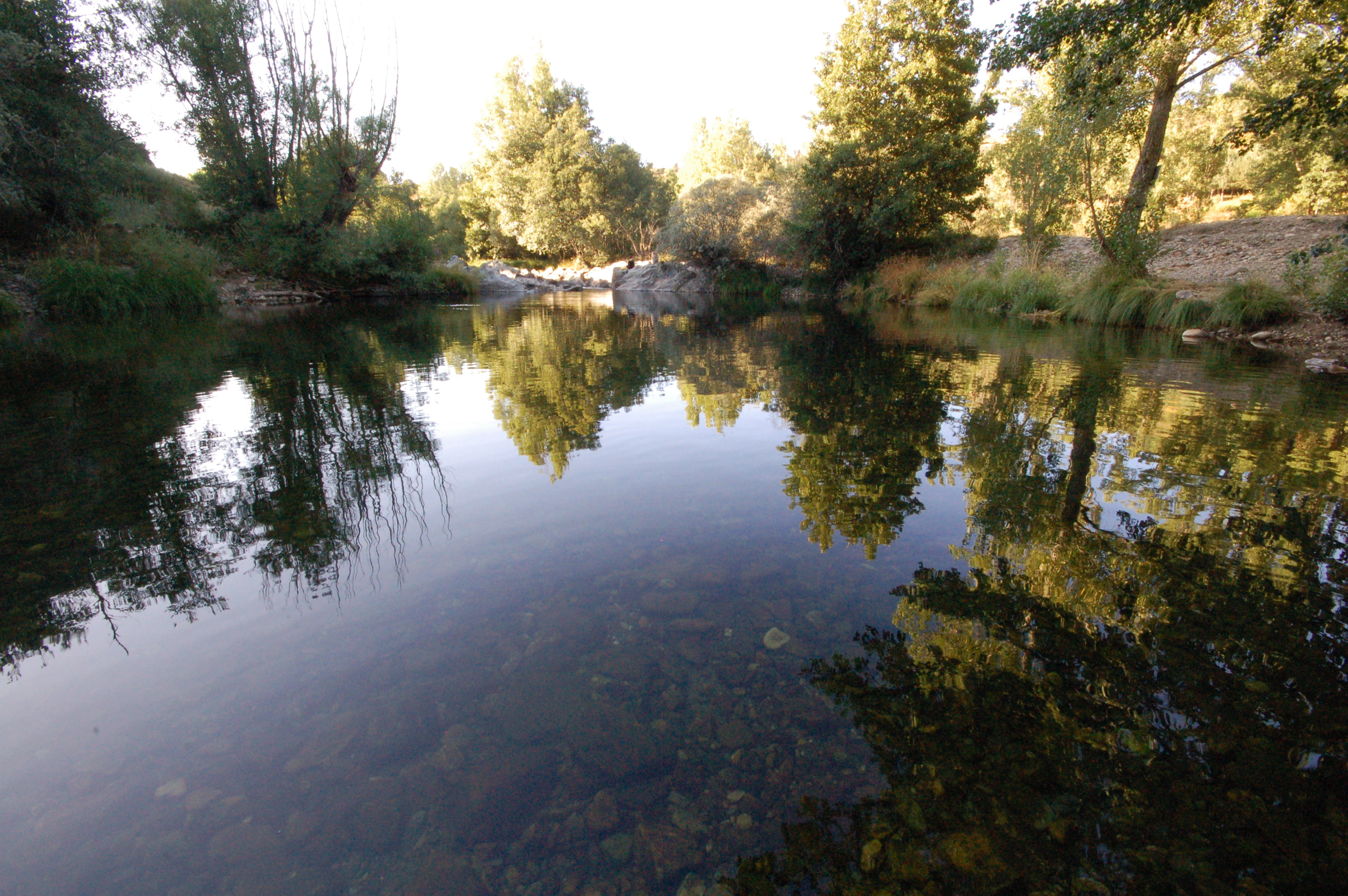
- The Omaña River as it passes through La Omañuela.

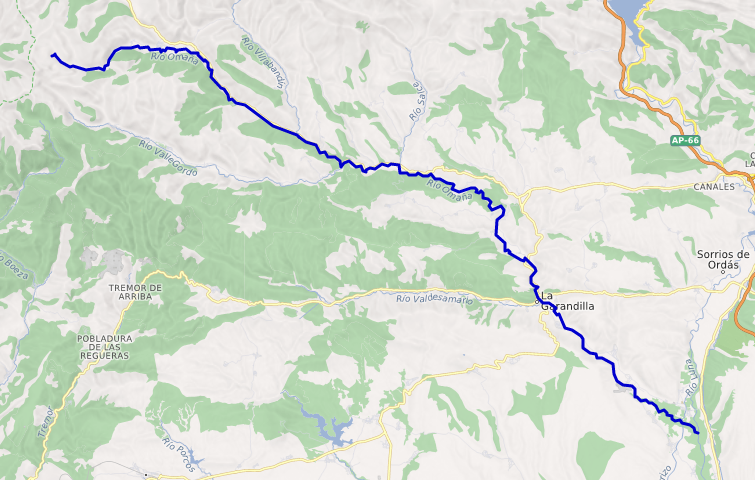
- Location of Omaña

Location
- Country: Spain
- Autonomous community: Castile and León, Provincia de León

Physical characteristics
- Source: Fuente del Miro Viejo (Tambarón)
  - elevation: 1,906 metres (6,253 ft)
- Mouth: Órbigo River
  - location: Secarejo, Cimanes del Tejar
  - coordinates: 42°39′14″N 5°49′20″W
- Basin size: 516 square kilometres (199 sq mi)
- Discharge
  - location: At the Órbigo River:
  - average: 14.56 cubic metres per second (514 cu ft/s)

Basin features
- Progression: Órbigo → Esla → Douro → Atlantic Ocean
- River system: Duero basin

Omaña River is a river with located in the northwest of Spain, in the province of León. It is formed as a stream at the water spring from the eastern slope of Tambarón Peak, in the village of Montrondo, which falls within the municipality of Murias de Paredes and ends when its waters converge with the Luna River, forming the Órbigo River.

== Etymology ==
According to tradition, the name of the river comes from the name that the Romans gave to the inhabitants of the region it crosses: homus manium or "godmen", due to their hardness and resistance. Eutimio Martino however considers that the name of the river comes from Aqua Mania, interpretation consistent with other hydronyms of the northern peninsula. According to this analysis, the river lent its name to the region and not the other way around.

== Geography ==
The Omaña river crosses the region to which it gives its name; passing through the towns of Murias de Paredes, Vegarienza, El Castillo, Guisatecha, La Omañuela, Inicio, Las Omañas and others. It joins the Luna River near Santiago del Molinillo.

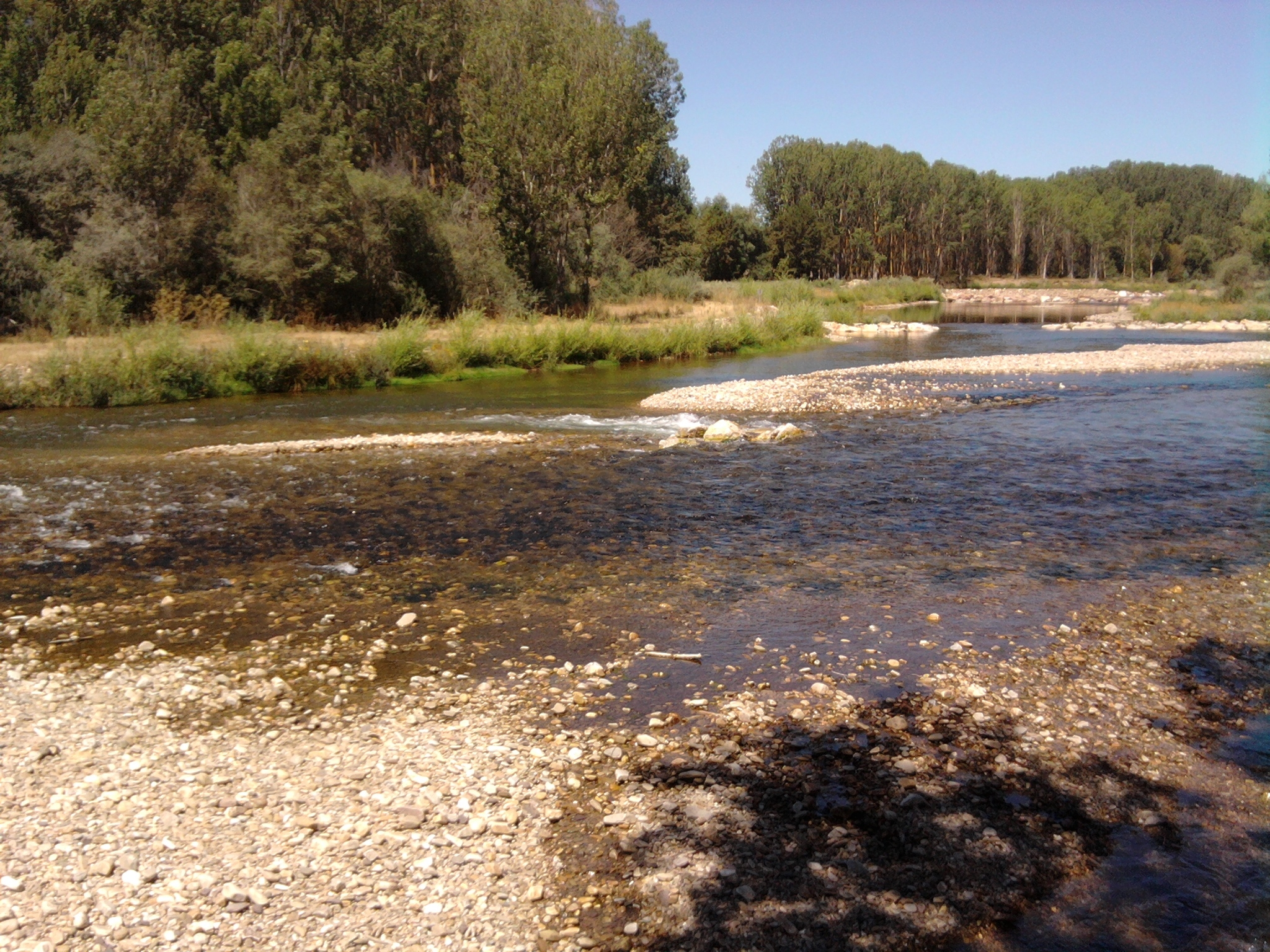
Birth of the Órbigo at the confluence of the Omaña and Luna rivers

Along its route it receives water from the rivers Pequeno, Vallegordo, Negro and Valdesamario on the right and from the Sabugo stream, the Valdaín River, the Santibáñez and the Velilla River on the left, all with low flow, in addition to some seasonal streams. The main tributary is the Valdesamario River, which enters into the Omaña at La Garandilla.

The riverbed is subject to large floods in the winter as it does not have reservoirs to contain it, so flooding and overflowing are common during winter and spring in riverside towns. In 2010 the Duero Hydrographic Confederation invested nearly 120,000 euros to improve the riverbed and alleviate the effects of floods. In the past there was a project to create a 200,000,000 m^{3} (7.1×10^{9} cu ft) swamp, but all attempts to carry it out have met with opposition from affected locals and environmental groups. The Ministry of Public Works, Transport and Communications resolved in 1993 to paralyse the project.

== See also ==
- Omaña
