= Matar judíos =

Spanish folk tradition

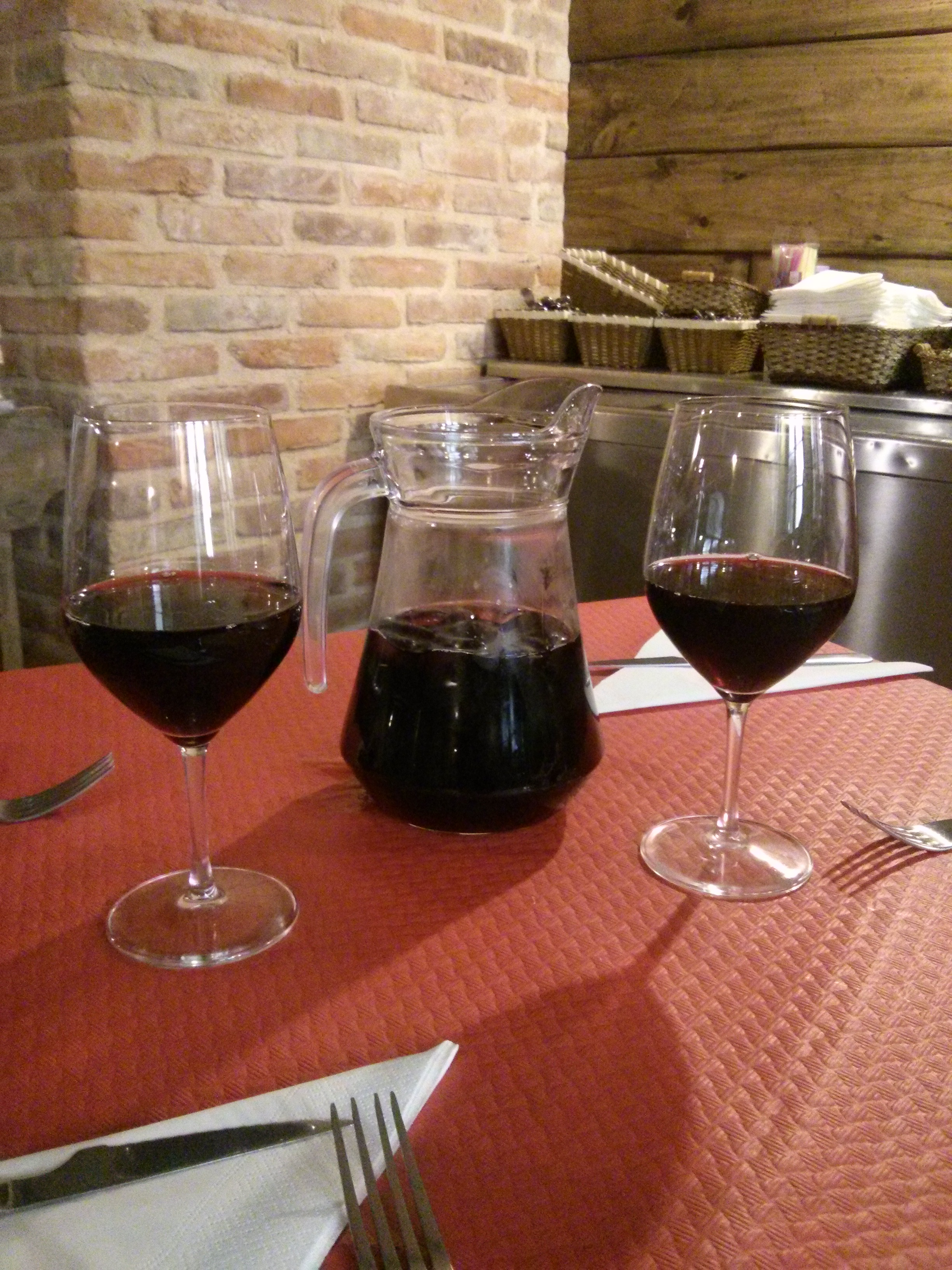
- Leonese lemonade, drunk during the "Matar judíos"
- Type: Spanish
- Significance: Celebration of Easter, originally to celebrate pogroms against Jews accused of killing Jesus Christ
- Celebrations: drinking alcoholic beverages, especially Leonese lemonade
- Date: Holy Week
- Frequency: Annual
- Started by: Disputed, possibly Suero de Quiñones during the 15th century
- Related to: Easter

Matar judíos (lit. 'to kill Jews') is a tradition during Holy Week celebrations in the northern Spanish Province of León, especially in the city of León and its environs, during which participants drink Leonese lemonade, consisting primarily of lemonade, red wine, and sugars.

Critics argue that the name is offensive and perpetuates antisemitic stereotypes. Supporters, however, argue that the current practice is not meant to be antisemitic, and view it as a cultural tradition.

== Origins ==
Violence against the Jewish quarter of León, then in the area of Puente Castro, during the 12th century by Kings Alfonso VIII of Castile and Peter II of Aragon forced the city's Jews to resettle in the Santa Ana neighborhood. In 1196, the Jewish quarter of Leon was destroyed.

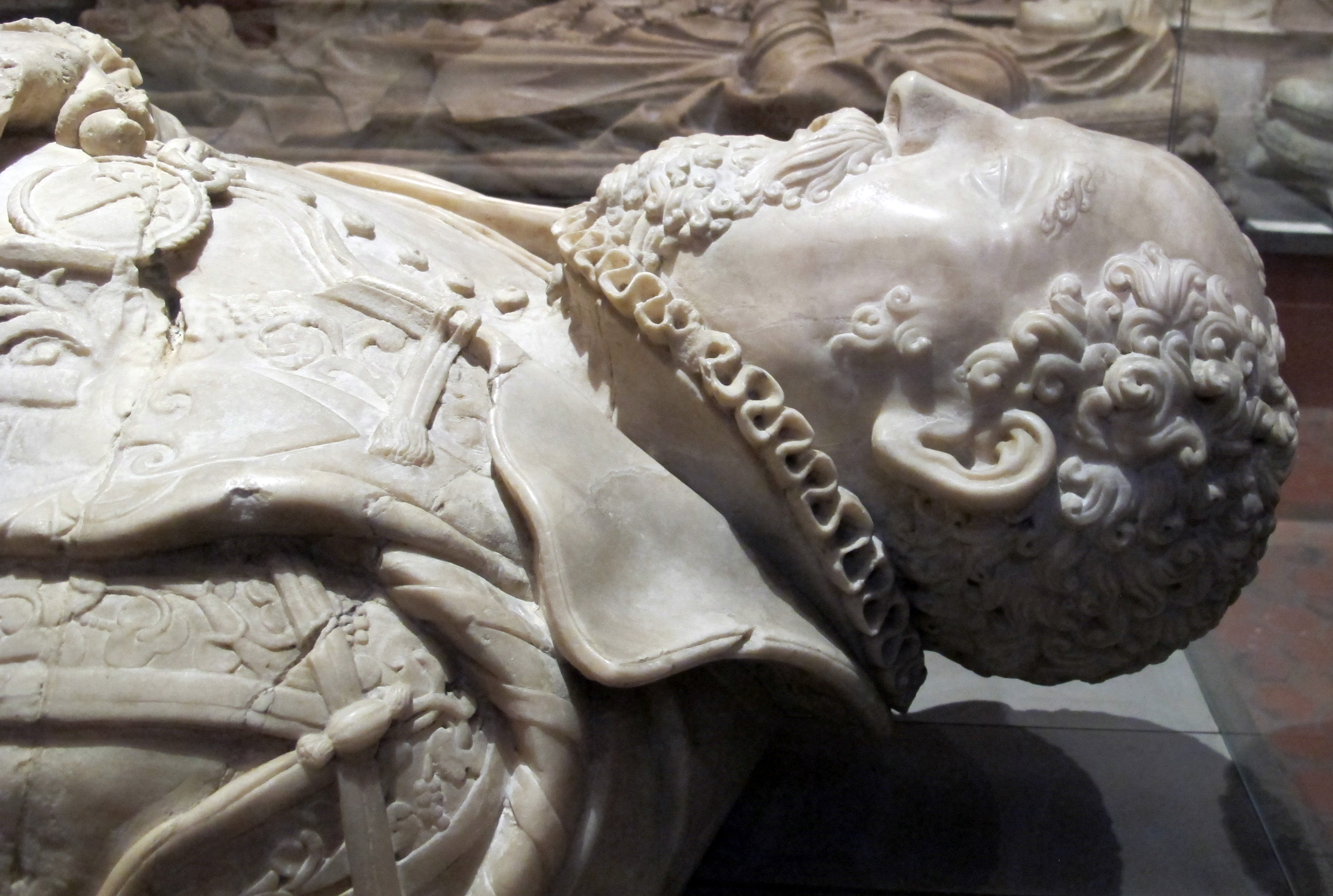
Part of the 16th century sarcophagus of Suero de Quiñones by Italian sculptor Pompeo Leoni

The most common version of the tradition's origins is from University of León historian Margarita Torres. By the 15th century, Christian resentment in León over debts, loans owed to Jews, and general antisemitic fervor after the Black Death commonly led to violence against the Jewish population during Holy Week. In 1449, Leonese nobleman Suero de Quiñones owed money to a Jewish lender. To avoid paying off his debt, Quiñones rallied the Christian population against the Jews, on the notion of Jewish deicide; that the Jews were collectively responsible for Jesus's death. On Maundy Thursday and Good Friday, Quiñones and his companions attacked the Jewish quarter and killed many Jews, including the lender to whom Quiñones owed money. To celebrate the pogrom, Quiñones and his supporters drank wine.

Another theory is that during the Middle Ages, the local Christian population of León sought revenge on the Jewish population in the Jewish quarter near the Humedo neighborhood, inspired by the Jewish deicide canard. To divert the rioters, local authorities allowed the sale of alcoholic beverages, include the spiced wine beverage that came to be known as Leonese lemonade. The rioters became drunk and did not continue the pogrom.

According to the Federation of Jewish Communities of Spain, the name referred to public executions of Jews at show trials at Eastertime during the Middle Ages.

== Celebration ==
=== 20th century ===
By the beginning of the 20th century, there were efforts by the Spanish press to retire the "matar judíos" name for the tradition. During celebrations at the turn of the 20th century, revelers would create effigies of Jews, ridiculing and burning the representations of Jews.

=== 21st century ===
==== Castile and León ====
The city of León holds its "Matar Judíos" festival on Good Friday as part of the 10-day Semana Santa celebration. As many as 16,000 revelers consume 40,000 gallons of Leonese lemonade, called limonada, during the celebrations. The drink is served in nearly every bar in Casco Antiguo de León, the city's center for nightlife which includes two streets in the historic Jewish quarter of León. Signs advertise the drink throughout the neighborhood, with some bars using the phrase as a hashtag when advertising their specials on social media as a point of pride in the city's heritage.

According to tradition, celebrants drink 33 glasses of lemonade between Friday of Sorrows and Easter Sunday, in commemoration of the age at which Jesus Christ died. It is also a centuries-old tradition for revelers ordering limonada to say they are "going out to kill Jews." According to Professor Torres, another common expression is "How many Jews have you killed? Three, four, five [limonadas]? Oh, you have killed a lot.'"

There are also celebrations in Ponferrada, Astorga, Sahagún, and La Maragatería. In El Bierzo, locals toast, "Salir a matar judíos" -- "Let's go kill the Jews" -- while drinking Leonese lemonade during Holy Week. The tradition has also been linked to the Spanish expression, "Limonada que trasiego, judío que pulverizo" ("Lemonade I drink, the Jew I pulverize").

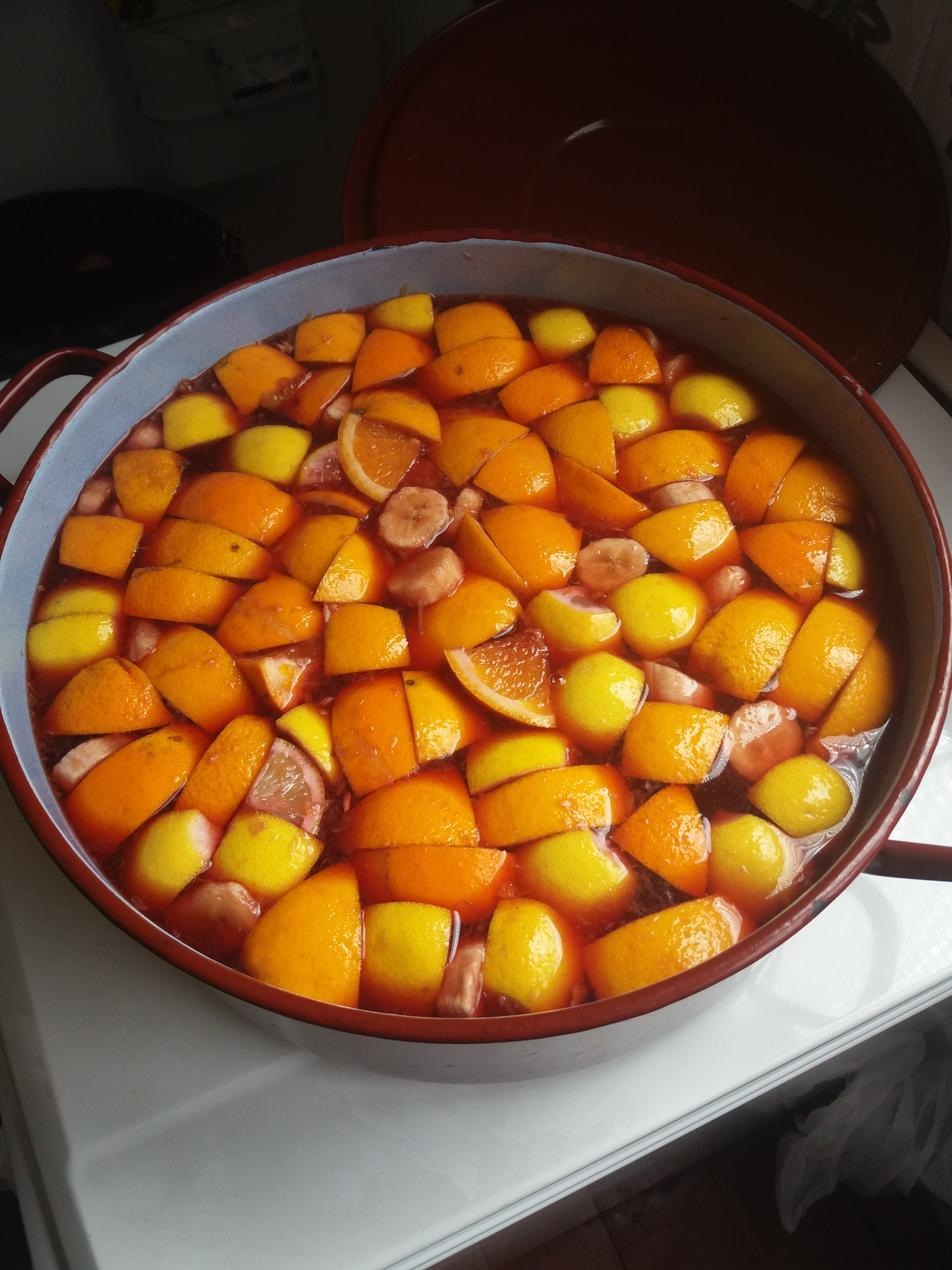
Leonese lemonade

In recent years, bars and hotels in León have begun to offer Leonese lemonade year-round instead of only during Holy Week.

=== Other parts of Spain ===
In the autonomous communities of Asturias and Catalonia, the tradition of "matar judíos" (Asturian: matar los xudíos, Catalan: matar jueus) was celebrated by children. For example, until the 1950s in Girona, children would go into the streets on Holy Saturday and make noise with pots, wooden utensils, drums, whistles, and trumpets as part of the celebration.

== Reception ==
The Jewish culture network Tarbut Sefarad has called to discontinue the tradition; however, the general Leonese population argues that the phrase is not antisemitic and that current manifestations of the celebration are not reflections of antisemitic sentiments. Some scholars, however, note that Holy Week traditions in Spain often perpetuate pejorative portrayals of Jews rooted in Catholic heritage, suggesting that such customs may preserve religiously motivated antisemitic imagery.

== See also ==
- Antisemitism in Spain
- Castrillo Mota de Judíos, a city in Spain previously called "Fort Kill the Jews," which is not connected to the matar judios tradition
