= Órbigo =

River in Spain

Coordinates: 41°59′23.62″N 5°42′23.58″W

Órbigo Latin: Urbicus
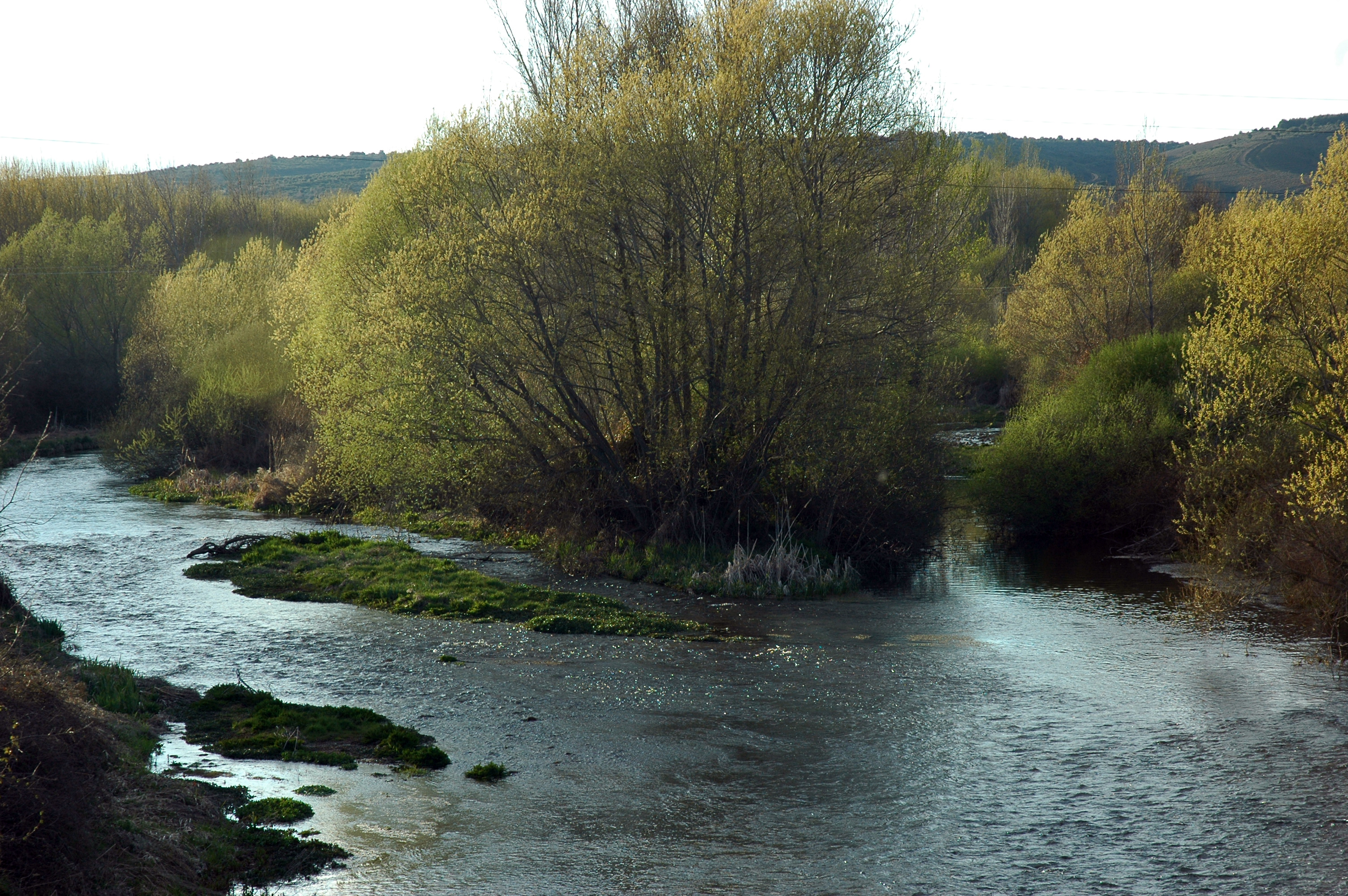
- The union of the rivers Luna and Omaña at this point form the Órbigo river

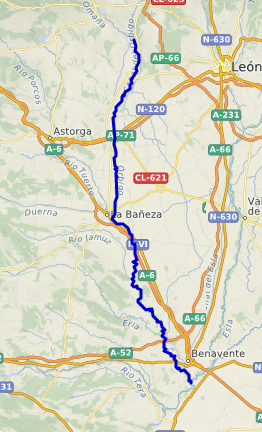

Location
- Country: Spain

Physical characteristics
- Source: Union of the rivers Luna and Omaña
  - location: Secarejo, Cimanes del Tejar, Ribera del Órbigo, León, Castile and León, Spain
  - elevation: 902 m (2,959 ft)
- Mouth: Esla river
  - location: Santa Colomba de las Monjas, Benavente y Valles, Zamora, Castile and León, Spain
  - elevation: 702 m (2,303 ft)
- Length: 162 km (101 mi)
- Basin size: 4,995 km^{2} (1,929 sq mi)
- Discharge
  - location: mouth
  - average: 38.81 m^{3}/s (1,371 cu ft/s)

Basin features
- Tributaries
  - right: Duerna, Tuerto, Jamuz and Eria

The Órbigo River is a river in the provinces of León and Zamora, Spain. It begins at the convergence of the Luna River and the Omaña River in the village of Secarejo, in the Cimanes del Tejar municipality. Decades ago, that confluence was some km. before, in the town of Santiago del Molinillo. It flows from north to south through the province of León and ultimately flows into the Esla River below Benavente.

How the river came to have this name is not known. According to the linguist E. Bascuas, the toponym Órbigo, would come from a Paleo-European hydronymic theme *urw-, derived from the Indo-European root *er- 'flow, move', with a hydronymic meaning. The first mention is from Hydatius "Ad fluvium nomine Urbicum". The name could also have Basque roots, from the words "Ur" (water) and "Bi" (two). There exists a theory that the river now called the Luna should be the real start of the Órbigo. Although it was the same river, in the times of the Conde Luna, it was ordered to change that name of the river so that the part in the county would have its name.

== Tributaries ==
- Duerna
- Tuerto
- Jamuz
- Eria
- Special tributary: Presa Cerrajera, which splits from the Órbigo and later flows into it again

== Gallery ==
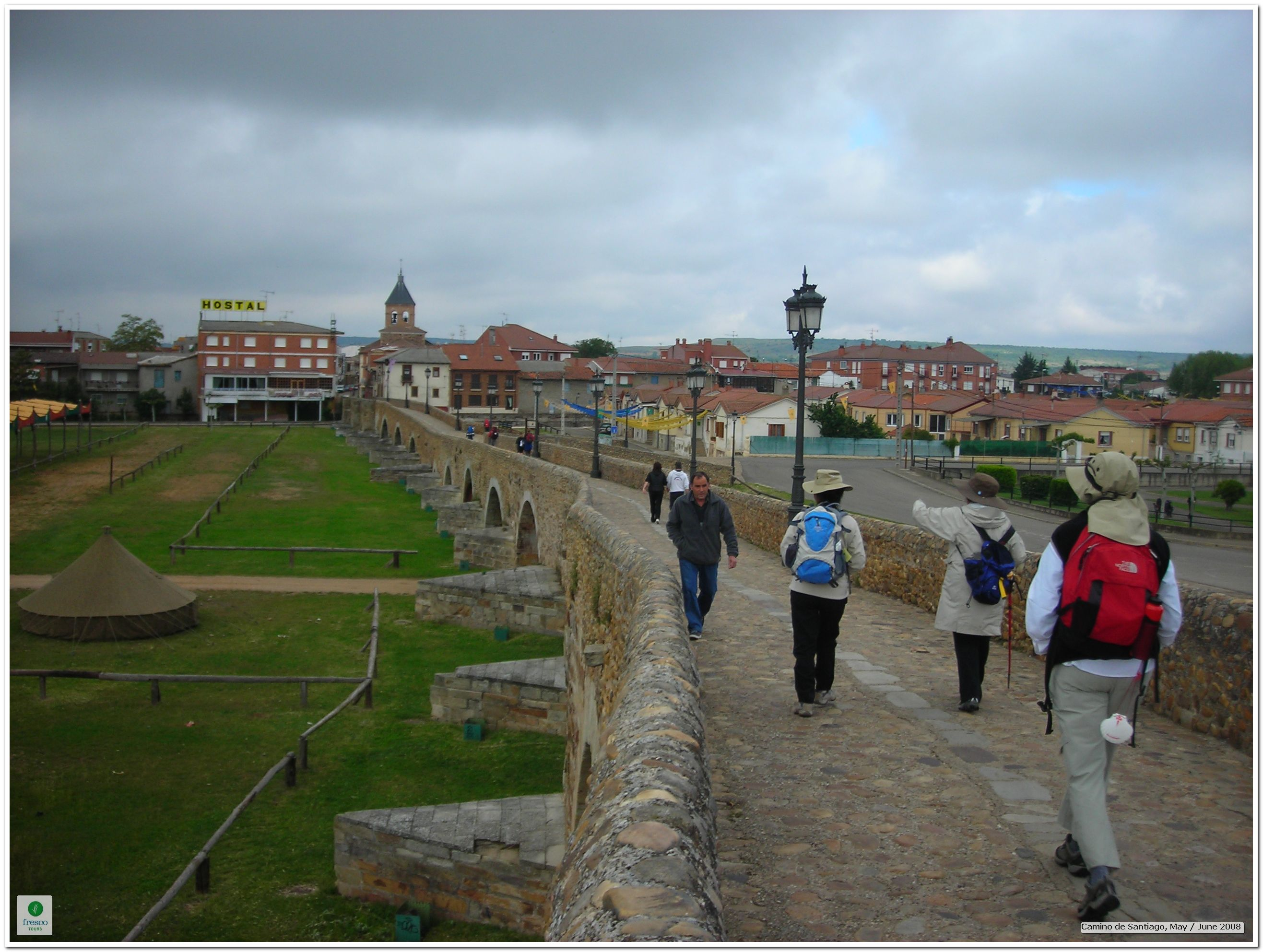
In 1433 on this spot—the bridge over the river Órbigo—Suero de Quiñones and ten of his knights challenged all comers to a Pas d'Armes, promising to "break 300 lances" before moving on.

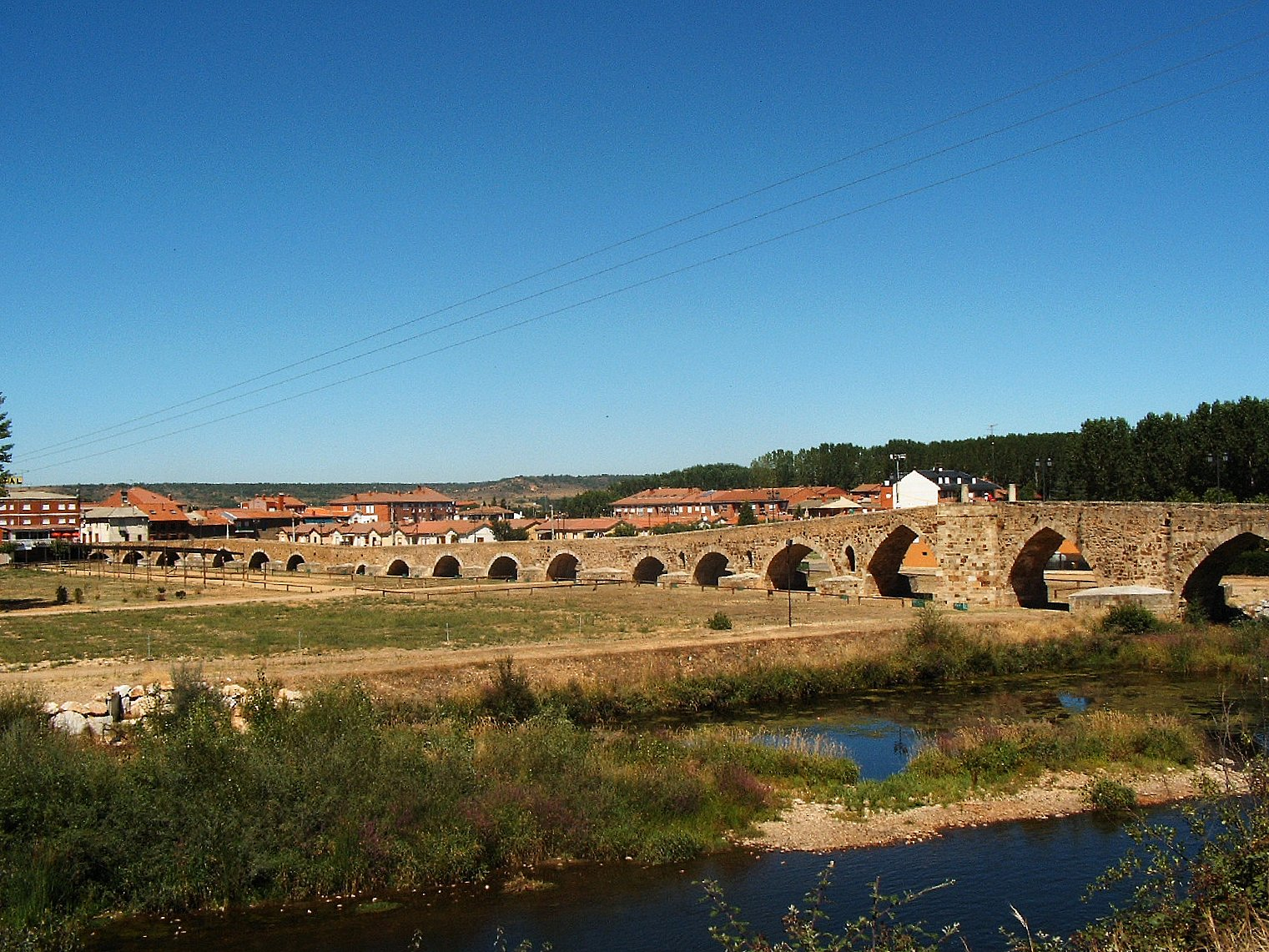
Medieval bridge over the Órbigo River in Hospital de Órbigo, León

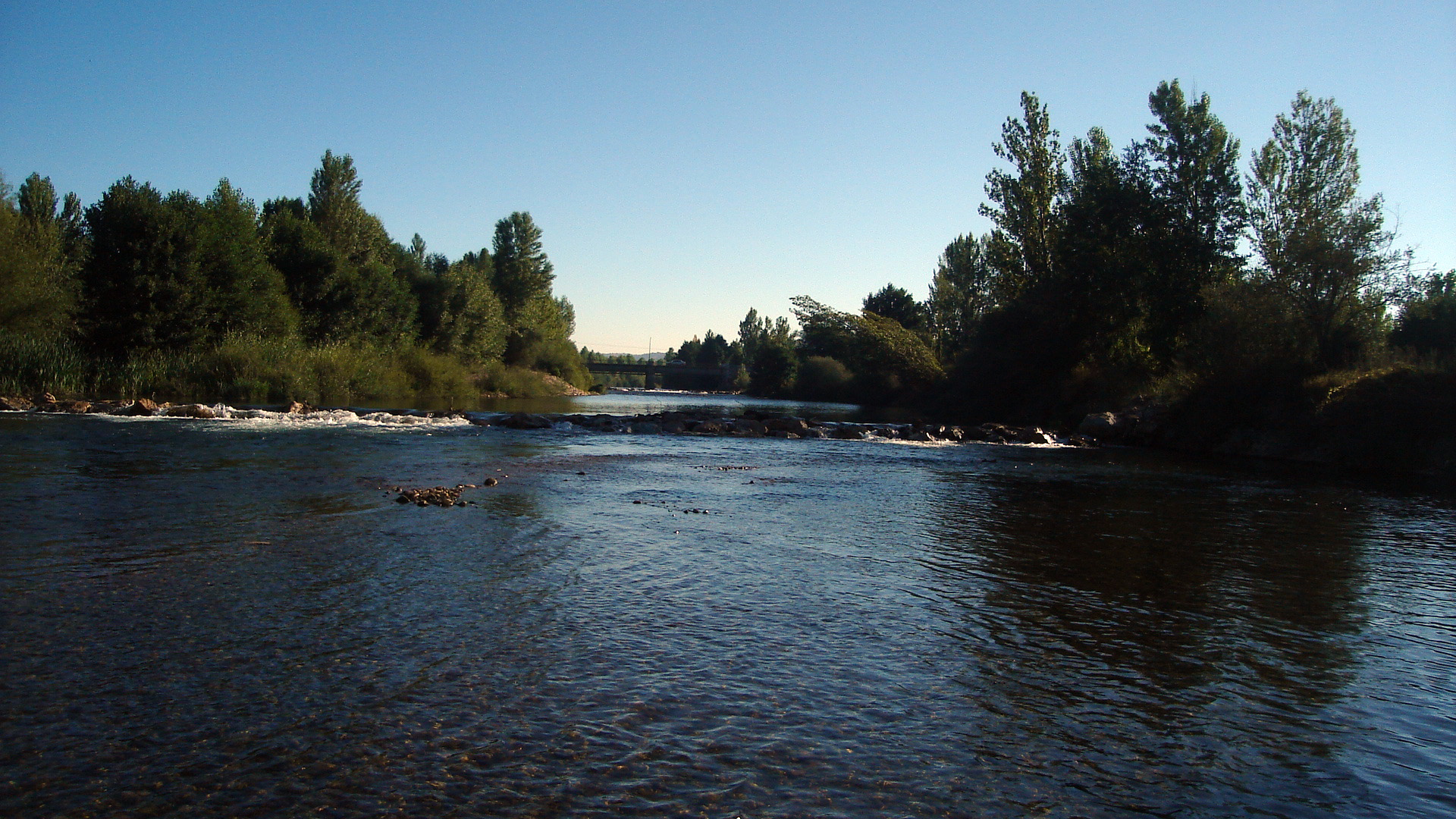
Órbigo river watershed

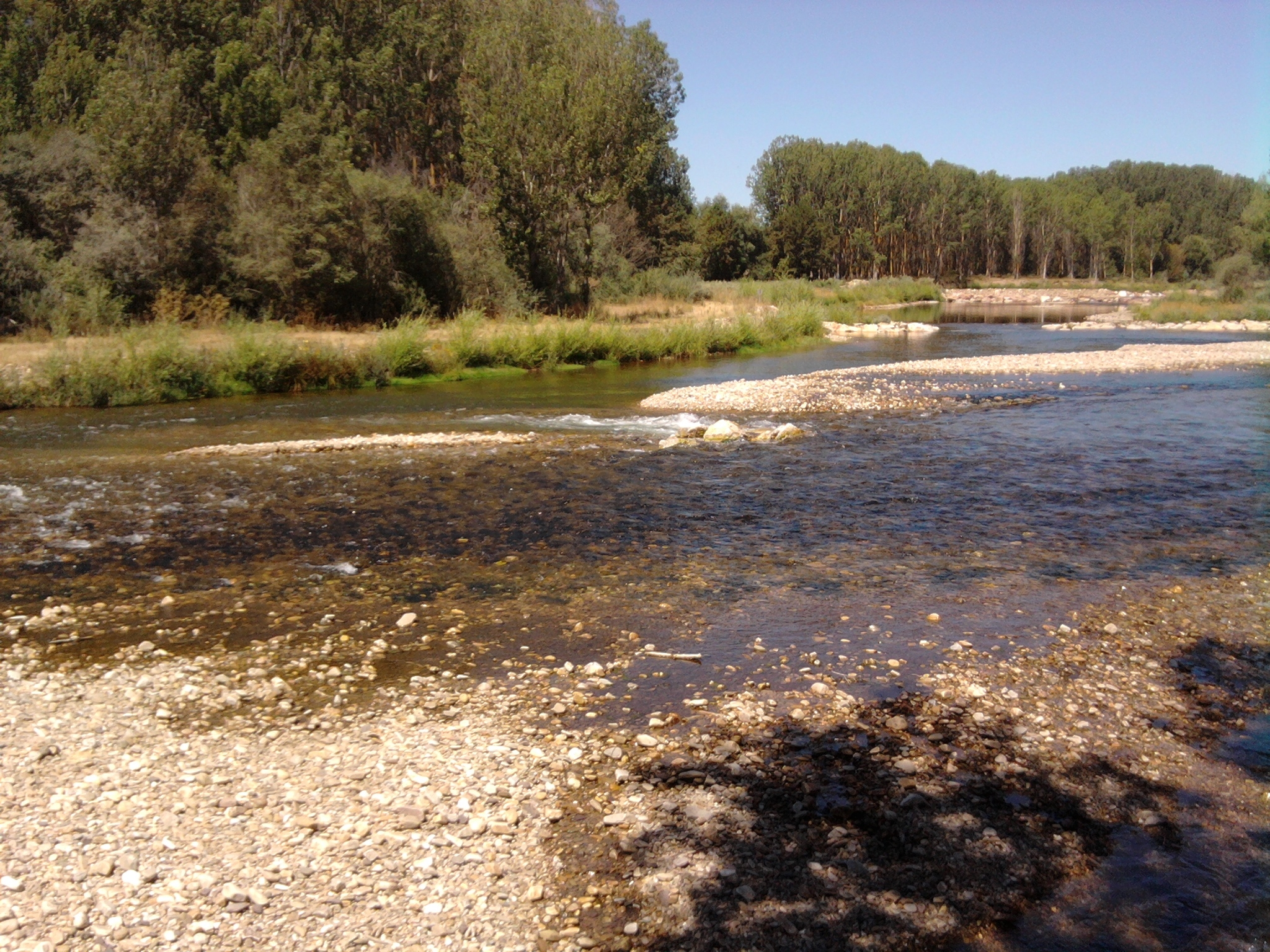
Another view of the union of the Luna and Omaña rivers, forming the Órbigo

== See also ==
- List of rivers of Spain
