= Rodicol =

- Location in Spain
- Coordinates: 42°50′41″N 6°6′59″W
- Country: Spain
- Autonomous community: Castile and León
- Province: León
- Comarca: Omaña
- Judicial district: Villablino
- Municipality: Murias de Paredes

Population
  - Total: 4
- Postal code: 987
- Area code: 24134

Rodicol is a Spanish town that is part of the municipality of Murias de Paredes, in the province of León, autonomous community of Castile and León. This town had population of 14 in 2007 and dropped down to 4 in 2022.

People of this place and Omaña began to migrate to Argentina, Brazil and Venezuela at the beginning and later to Europe or other regions of Spain.
