= Tambarón =

Mountain in Province of León, Spain

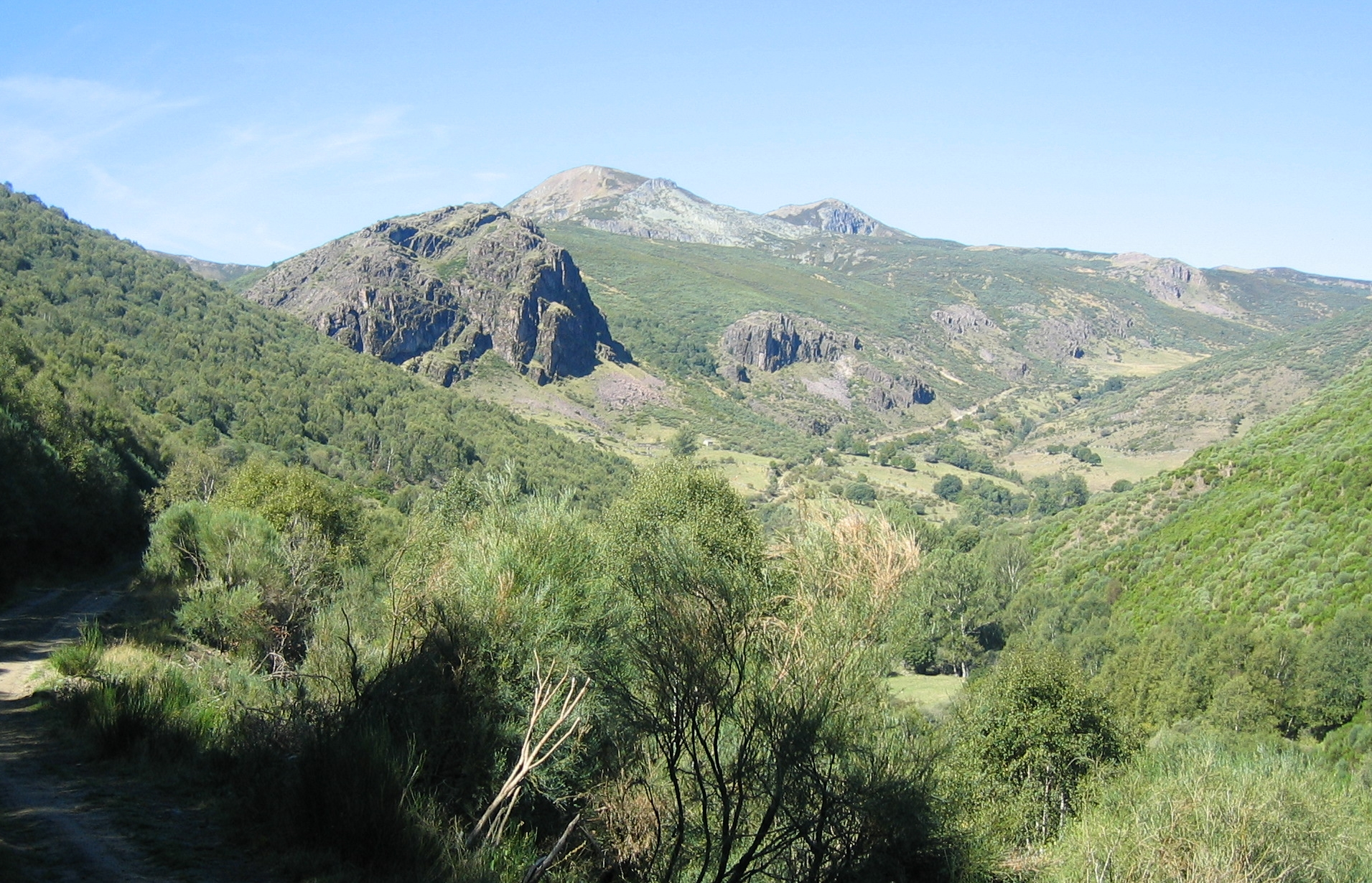
- View of Tambarón from the municipality of Montrondo

Highest point
- Elevation: 2,102 metres (6,896 ft)
- Parent peak: Gistredo Mountains, Cantabrian Mountains
- Coordinates: 42°50′18″N 6°16′27″W

Geography
- Location within Province of León
- Country: Spain
- Autonomous community: Castile and León
- Province: León

Tambarón or Pico Tambarón is a 2,102 metres (6,896 ft) high mountain located in the Gistredo Mountains in Spain on the border between the regions of Omaña and El Bierzo and the basins of the Douro and Miño. On its eastern slope, about 1,800 metres (5,900 ft) of altitude, it is source the Omaña River at Murias de Paredes.
