= Hospital de Órbigo =

Hospital de Órbigo, Spain
- Coat of arms

- Location within Spain
- Coordinates: 42°27′40″N 5°53′3″W
- Country: Spain
- Autonomous community: Castile and León
- Province: León
- Municipality: Hospital de Órbigo

Government
  - Mayor: José Miguel Cordón Marcos (PSOE)

Area
  - Total: 4.8 km^{2} (1.9 sq mi)
- Elevation: 820 m (2,690 ft)

Population (2025-01-01)
  - Total: 948
  - Density: 200/km^{2} (510/sq mi)
- Time zone: UTC+1 (CET)
  - Summer (DST): UTC+2 (CEST)
- Postal Code: 24286
- Telephone prefix: 987
- Website: Ayto. de Hospital de Órbigo

Hospital de Órbigo (Spanish pronunciation: [ospiˈtal de ˈoɾβiɣo]) is a municipality located in the province of León, Castile and León, Spain. According to the 2010 census (INE), the municipality had a population of 1,031 inhabitants.

It is a stopping point along the Camino de Santiago and has a long stone medieval bridge, which was recently restored. The town itself is part of the community of Puente de Órbigo, puente meaning bridge.

== History ==
During the Middle Ages there was a small village along the east side of the Órbigo River with a small church dedicated to the Virgin Mary, called Puente de Órbigo. In the 16th century the Knights Hospitaller established a pilgrim hospital on the west side of the river that came to be called Hospital de Órbigo.

The town was a battle site in 456 between forces loyal to Theuderic I and Rechiar. Due to the bridge it was also important during the battles during Spain's Reconquista with Almanzor passing through the town at least once. Closer to the modern era in the 19th century, the town's inhabitants destroyed their iconic bridge to slow the advance of Napoleon's forces into Spain.

== Tournament of 1434 ==
In 1434, the Leonese knight Suero de Quiñones held a tournament in which he or one of his companions challenged all men of equal rank who wished to cross the bridge here to a jousting tournament, Suero holding this bridge in the name of unrequited love. By 1434 the skill of jousting was not a standard part of military training but the challenge was taken seriously. Since 1434 was a Jacobean Holy Year, the traffic upon the Road of St James was considerable. The tournament lasted from July 11 until 9 August and Don Suero claimed to have broken 300 lances by the end. Twenty four years later Suero de Quiñones was killed by Gutierre de Quijada, a knight he had beaten at the 1434 tournament.
