= Duerna =

River in Spain

Coordinates: 42.3100°N 5.8961°W

Duerna Latin: Ornia
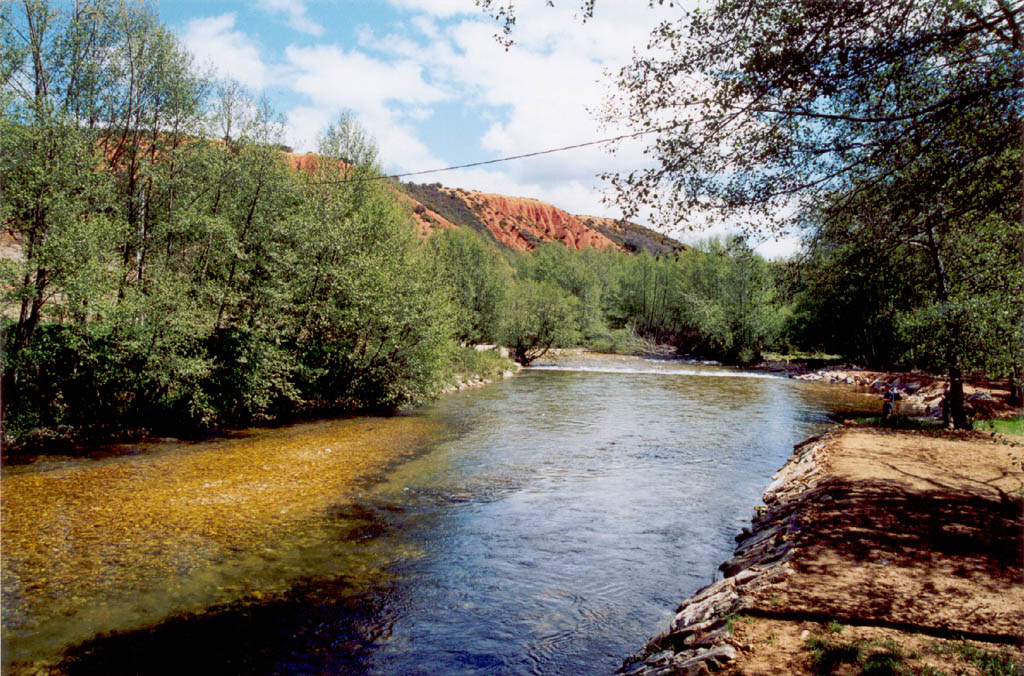
- Watershed of the Duerna at Priaranza de la Valduerna (Maragatería)

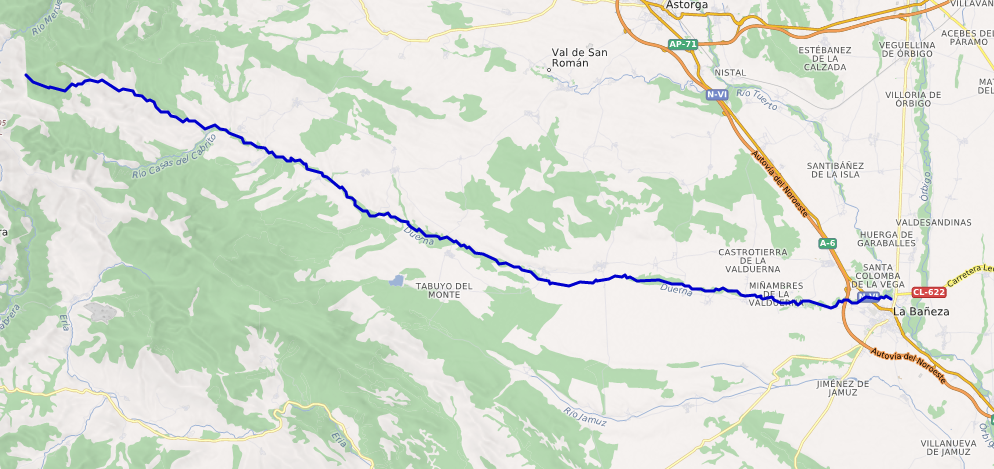

Location
- Country: Spain

Physical characteristics
- Source: Union of the streams Cabrito and Ballina
  - location: Pobladura de la Sierra, Lucillo, Maragatería, León, Castile and León, Spain
  - elevation: 1,120 m (3,670 ft)
- Mouth: Tuerto river
  - location: Requejo de la Vega, Soto de la Vega, Tierra de La Bañeza, León, Castile and León, Spain
  - elevation: 775 m (2,543 ft)
- Length: 54 km (34 mi)
- Basin size: 317 km^{2} (122 sq mi)

Basin features
- Tributaries
  - left: Peces
  - right: Espino, Llamas

The Duerna is a river in the province of León, Spain. It begins at the convergence of the Cabrito and Ballina streams, in the town of Pobladura de la Sierra, in the Lucillo municipality.
