= Valdesamario =

Coordinates: 42°43′N 5°57′W

Valdesamario, Spain
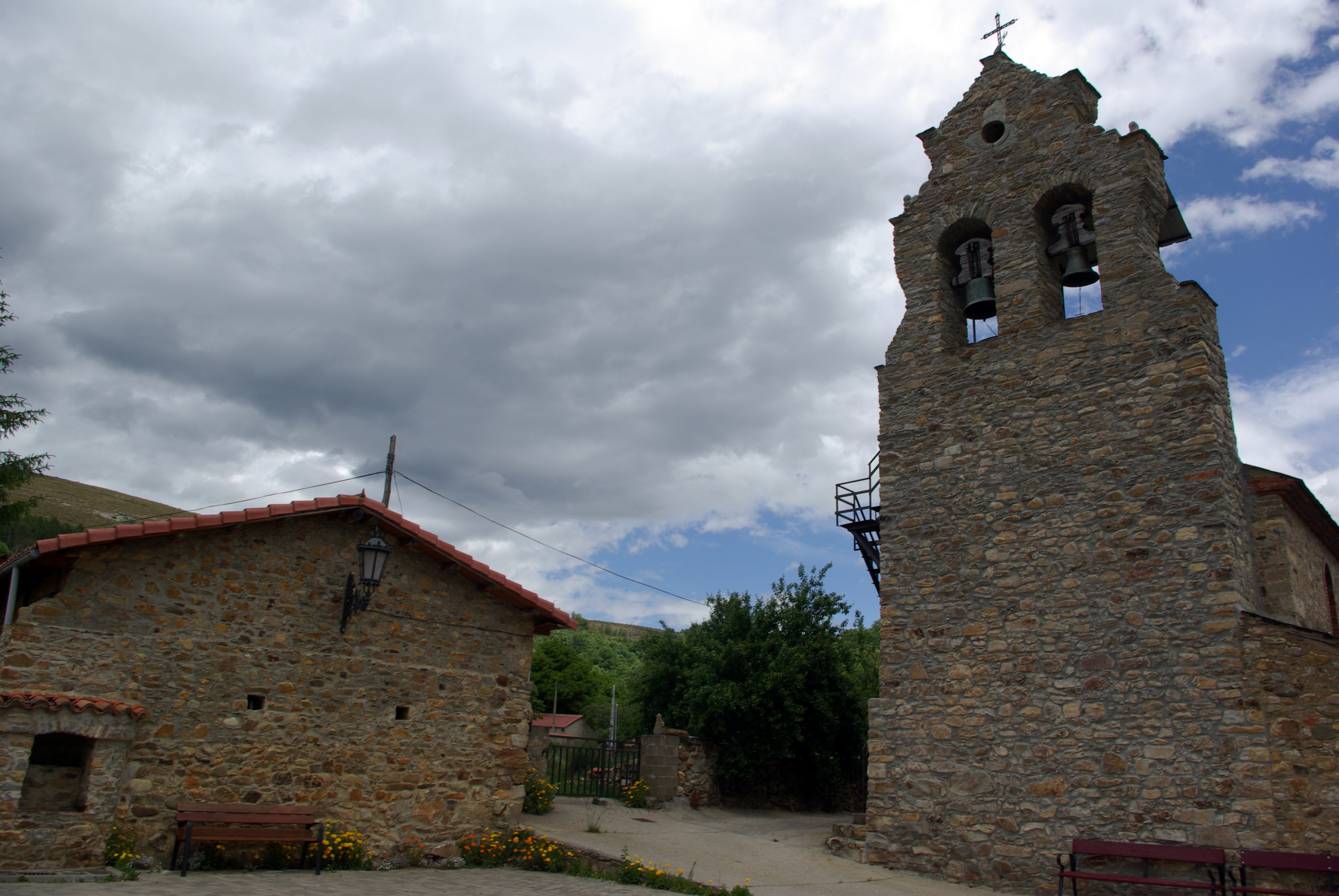
- The Church of Valdesamario

- Coat of arms
- Interactive map of Valdesamario, Spain
- Country: Spain
- Autonomous community: Castile and León
- Province: León
- Municipality: Valdesamario

Area
  - Total: 61 km^{2} (24 sq mi)

Population (2025-01-01)
  - Total: 167
  - Density: 2.7/km^{2} (7.1/sq mi)
- Time zone: UTC+1 (CET)
  - Summer (DST): UTC+2 (CEST)

Valdesamario is a municipality located in the province of León, Castile and León, Spain. According to the 2004 census (INE), the municipality has a population of 224 inhabitants.
