= Lucillo =

- municipality
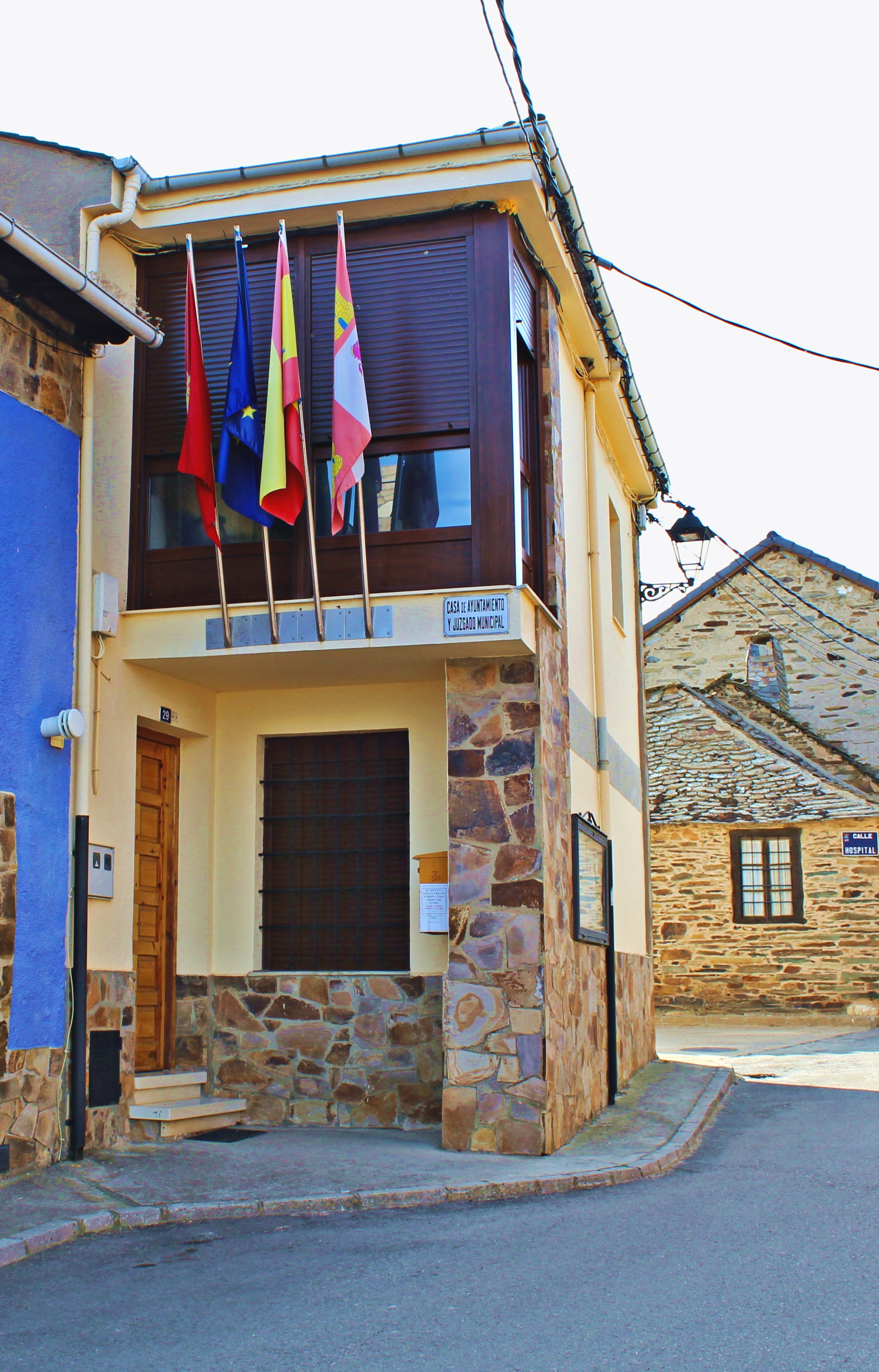
- Town hall

- Coat of arms

- Location within Spain
- Coordinates: 42°24′38″N 6°18′16″W
- Country: Spain
- Autonomous community: Castile and León
- Province: León
- Municipality: Lucillo

Government
  - Mayor: Pedro de Cabo Martínez (PP)

Area
  - Total: 164.91 km^{2} (63.67 sq mi)
- Elevation: 1,216 m (3,990 ft)

Population (2025-01-01)
  - Total: 360
  - Density: 2.2/km^{2} (5.7/sq mi)
- Demonym(s): maragato, maragata
- Time zone: UTC+1 (CET)
  - Summer (DST): UTC+2 (CEST)
- Postal Code: 24723
- Telephone prefix: 987
- Climate: Csb

Lucillo (Spanish pronunciation: [luˈθiʎo]) is a municipality located in the province of León, Castile and León, Spain. According to the 2010 census (INE), the municipality has a population of 406 inhabitants.
