= Soto y Amío =

Coordinates: 42°46′N 5°53′W

Soto y Amío, Spain
- Coat of arms
- Interactive map of Soto y Amío, Spain
- Country: Spain
- Autonomous community: Castile and León
- Province: León
- Municipality: Soto y Amío

Area
  - Total: 69 km^{2} (27 sq mi)

Population (2025-01-01)
  - Total: 706
  - Density: 10/km^{2} (27/sq mi)
- Time zone: UTC+1 (CET)
  - Summer (DST): UTC+2 (CEST)

Soto y Amío is a municipality located in the province of León, Castile and León, Spain. According to the 2004 census (INE), the municipality has a population of 1,011 inhabitants.
