= Leonese lemonade =

Traditional Spanish drink

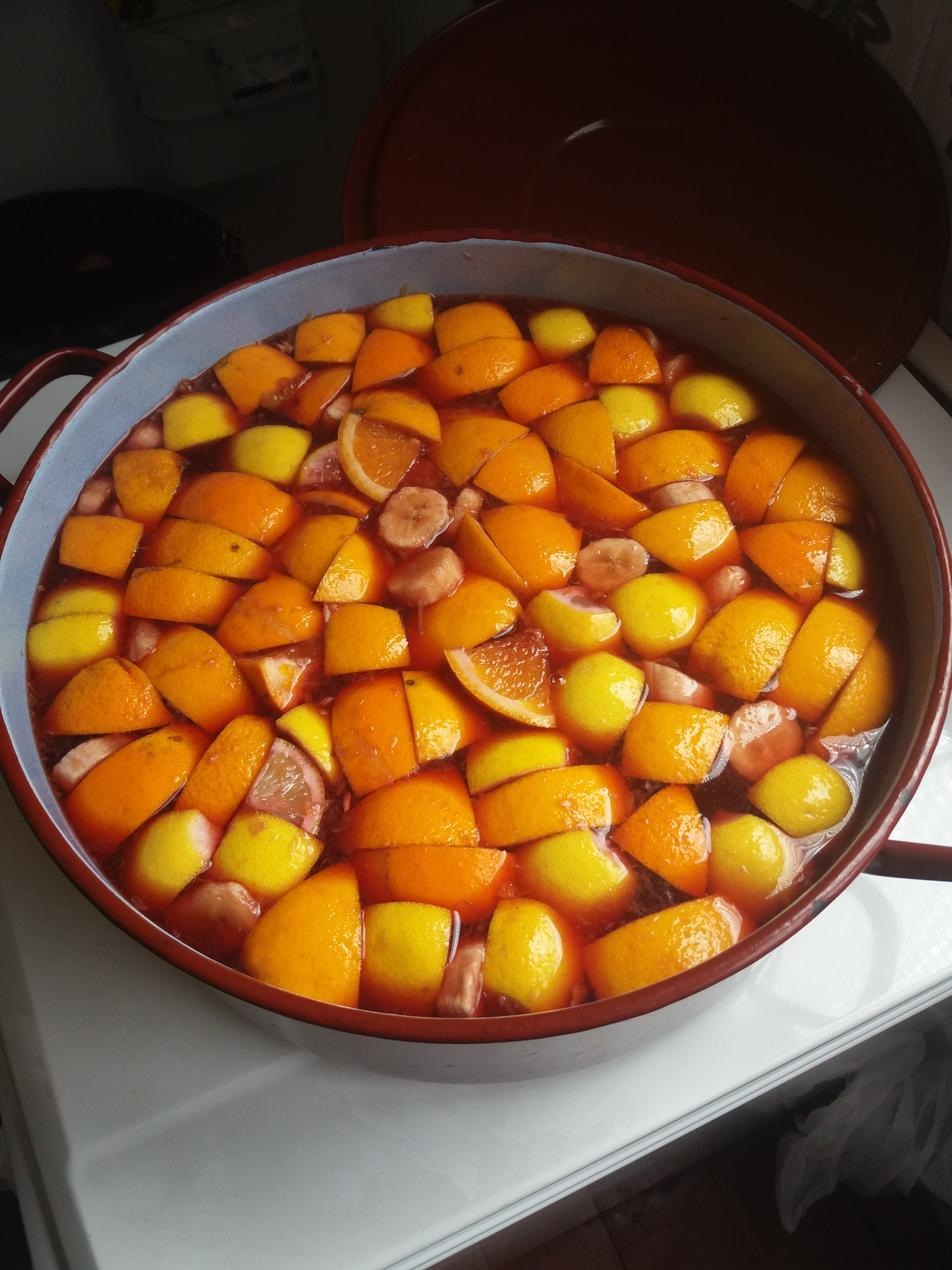
Wine lemonade in León (2019).

Holy Week lemonade, also known in Spain as Leonese lemonade, is a traditional drink from León made out of wine, lemons, sugar and cinnamon (sometimes, fruits such as raisins and figs are also included). It can take from three to eight days to prepare, depending on the recipe. Traditionally, it was drunk at any festive event, although nowadays it is customarily served during Holy Week.

== Matar judíos ==
Matar judíos (lit. 'killing Jews') is a tradition during Holy Week celebrations in the northern Spanish Province of León, especially in the city of León and its environs, during which participants drink Leonese lemonade, consisting primarily of lemonade, red wine, and sugars.

Critics argue that the name is offensive and perpetuates antisemitic stereotypes. Supporters, however, argue that the current practice is not meant to be antisemitic, and view it as a cultural tradition.

== See also ==
- Lemonade
- Sangria, or wine lemonade
- List of lemonade topics
