= Cimanes del Tejar =

Cimanes del Tejar, Spain
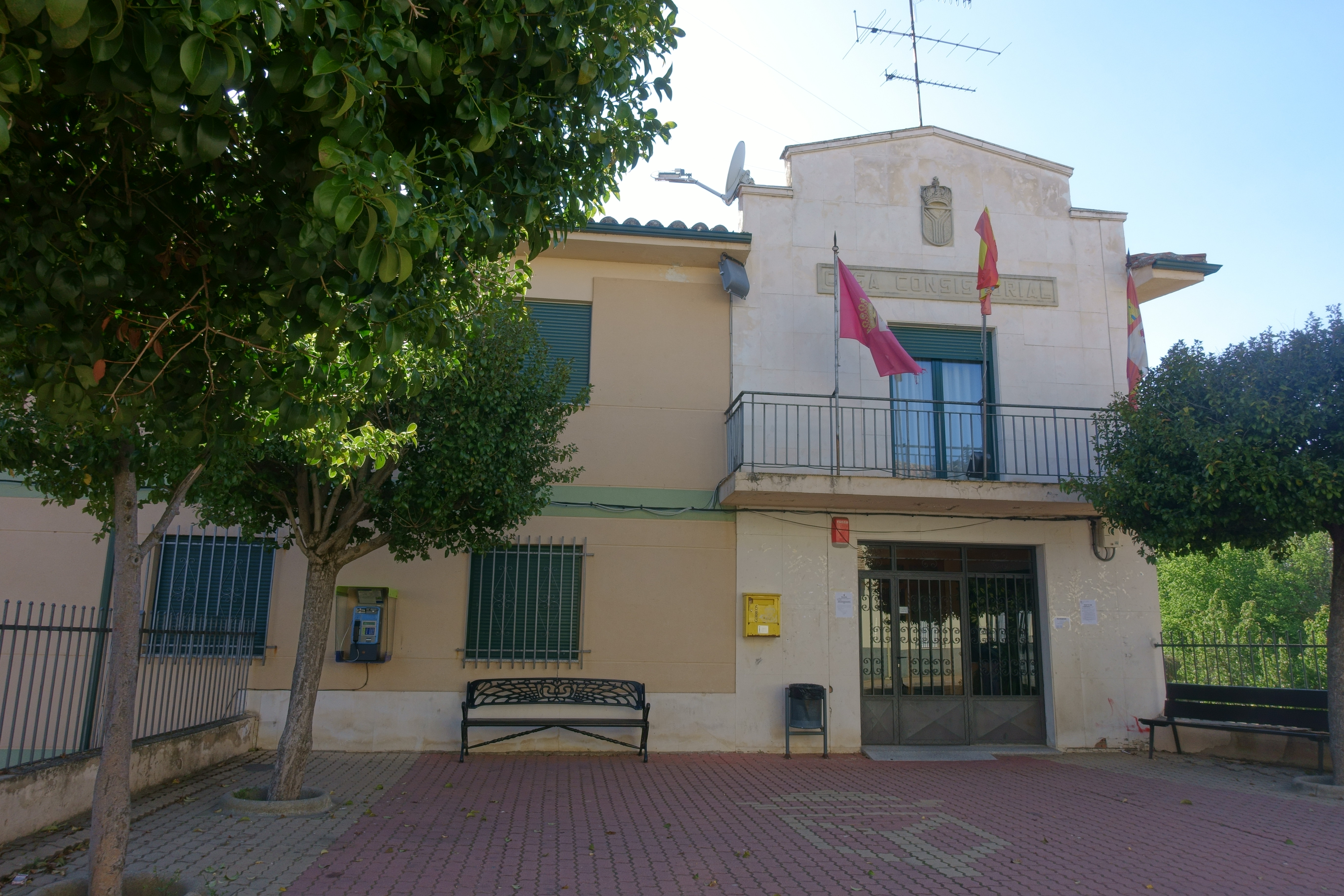
- Town hall

- Coat of arms

- Location within Spain
- Coordinates: 42°37′6″N 5°48′20″W
- Country: Spain
- Autonomous community: Castile and León
- Province: León
- Municipality: Cimanes del Tejar

Government
  - Mayor: Genaro Martínez Ferrero (PP)

Area
  - Total: 73.94 km^{2} (28.55 sq mi)
- Elevation: 903 m (2,963 ft)

Population (2025-01-01)
  - Total: 710
  - Density: 9.6/km^{2} (25/sq mi)
- Time zone: UTC+1 (CET)
  - Summer (DST): UTC+2 (CEST)
- Postal Code: 24272
- Telephone prefix: 987
- Website: Ayto. de Cimanes del Tejar

Cimanes del Tejar (Spanish pronunciation: [θiˈmanes ðel teˈxaɾ]) is a municipality located in the province of León, Castile and León, Spain. According to the 2010 census (INE), the municipality has a population of 825 inhabitants.
