= Las Omañas =

- Municipality
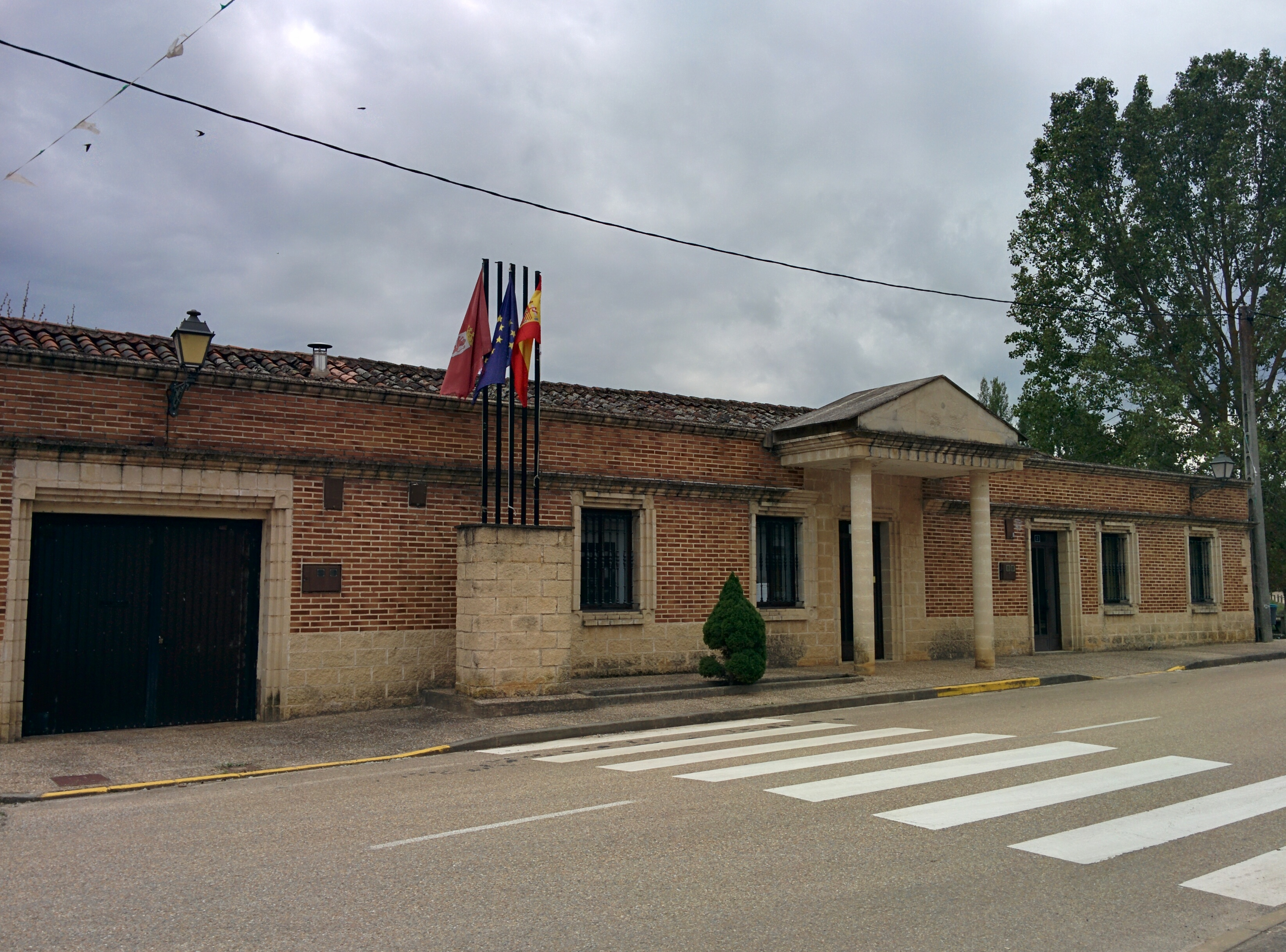

- Coat of arms

- Location in Castile and León Location in Spain
- Coordinates: 42°41′N 5°52′W
- Country: Spain
- Autonomous community: Castile and León
- Province: León
- Comarca: Ribera del Órbigo

Area
  - Total: 32 km^{2} (12 sq mi)

Population (2025-01-01)
  - Total: 267
  - Density: 8.3/km^{2} (22/sq mi)
- Time zone: UTC+1 (CET)
  - Summer (DST): UTC+2 (CEST)
- Website: aytolasomanas.es

Las Omañas (Las Oumañas in Leonese language) is a municipality located in the province of León, Castile and León, Spain. According to the 2025 census (INE), the municipality has a population of 267.
