= Margarita Torres =

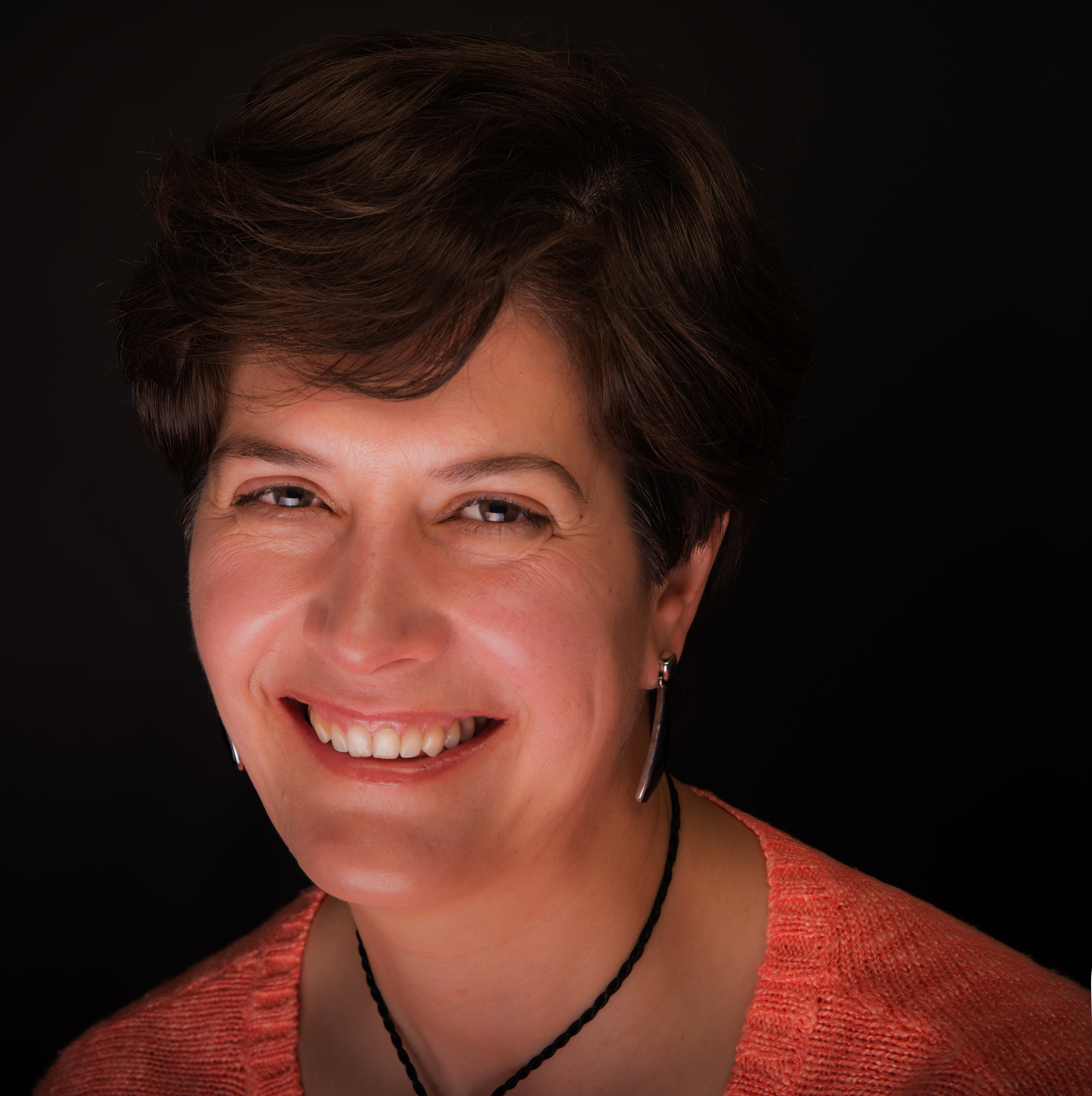
Margarita Torres Sevilla, Professor of Medieval History

Margarita Torres (Margarita Torres Sevilla) is a medieval historian, and professor of Medieval History at the University of León. In 2015, she was elected as Councillor for Culture, Heritage and Tourism for the city of León.

== Career ==
Torres received her PhD from the University of Leon in 1997. Her doctoral thesis was Monarcas Leoneses de la segunda mitad del siglo X : El declive Regio y el poder Nobiliario. Torres has published several books, including Enrique De Castilla (2003) and Linajes nobiliarios en León y Castilla (siglos IX-XIII) (1999).

She is known for suggesting that the Chalice of Doña Urraca is the Holy Grail.

== Selected bibliography ==
- El Reino de León en el Siglo X: el condado de Cea (1998). León: Universidad de Léon. ISBN 978-84-7719-700-3
- Linajes nobiliarios en el reino de León: parentesco, poder y mentalidad (1999). León: Universidad de Léon. ISBN 978-84-7719-701-0
- Linajes nobiliarios en León y Castilla siglos IX-XIII (1999). Salamanca: Consejería de Educación y Cultura de Castilla y León. ISBN 978-84-7846-781-5
- El Cid y otros señores de la guerra (2000; reed. 2003). León: Universidad de Léon, Secretariado de Publicaciones y Medios Audiovisuales. ISBN 978-84-7719-877-2
- «El linaje del Cid» Archivado el 17 de octubre de 2013 en Wayback Machine., Anales de la Universidad de Alicante. Historia Medieval. n.º 13 (2000–2002). ISSN 0212-2480, p. 343-360.
- Las batallas legendarias y el oficio de la guerra (2002; reed. 2003). Barcelona: Plaza & Janés. ISBN 978-84-01-34163-2
- Enrique de Castilla (2003). Barcelona: Plaza & Janés. ISBN 978-84-01-30521-4
- La profecía de Jerusalén (2010). Barcelona: EDHASA. ISBN 978-84-350-6199-5
- La cátedra de la calavera (2010). Madrid: Temas de Hoy. ISBN 978-84-8460-873-8
- Los Reyes del Grial (2014). Cordelia. ISBN 978-84-15973-29-4

== Wikipedia pages ==
- See the page for Margarita Torres on Spanish Wikipedia: https://es.wikipedia.org/wiki/Margarita_Torre
