= Murias de Paredes =

Coordinates: 42°51′N 6°11′W

- municipality
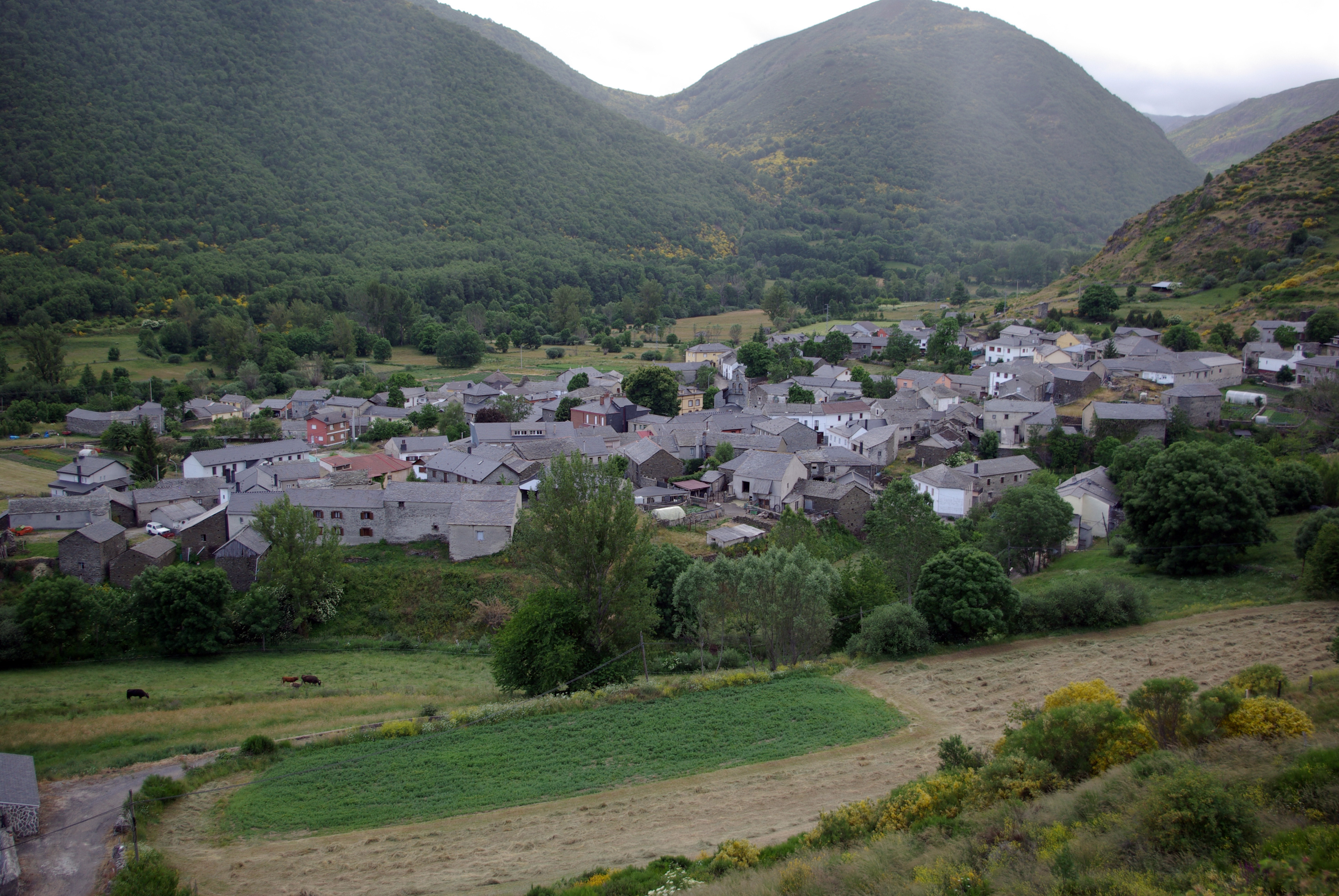

- Flag Coat of arms
- Interactive map of Murias de Paredes
- Country: Spain
- Autonomous community: Castile and León
- Province: León
- Municipality: Murias de Paredes

Area
  - Total: 202 km^{2} (78 sq mi)

Population (2025-01-01)
  - Total: 337
  - Density: 1.67/km^{2} (4.32/sq mi)
- Time zone: UTC+1 (CET)
  - Summer (DST): UTC+2 (CEST)

Murias de Paredes is a municipality located in the province of León, Castile and León, Spain. According to the 2004 census (by the INE), it has a population of 580 inhabitants.

It is about 1,254 meters above sea level, giving it a mountain climate.
