= Astorga, Spain =

Astorga
- Municipality
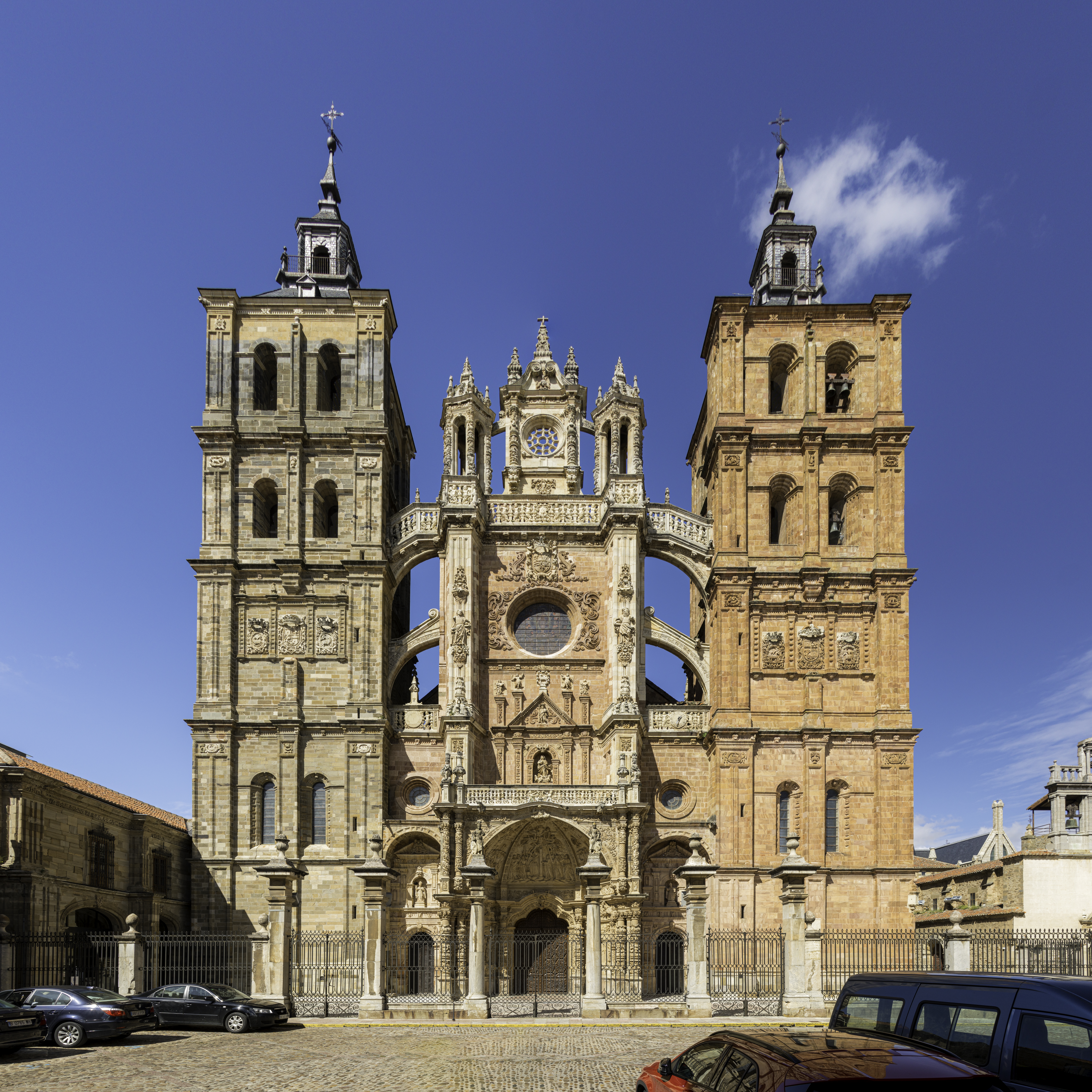
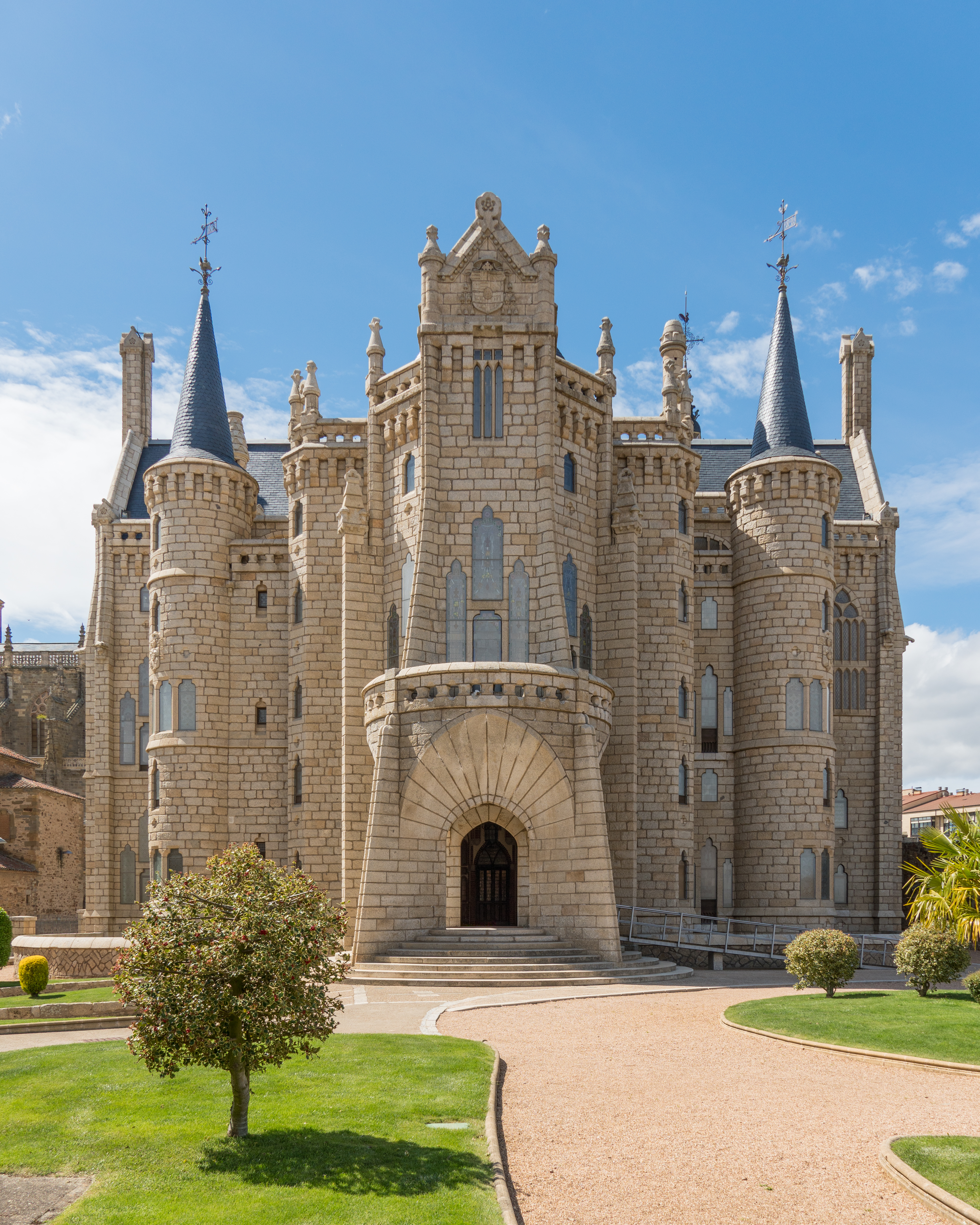
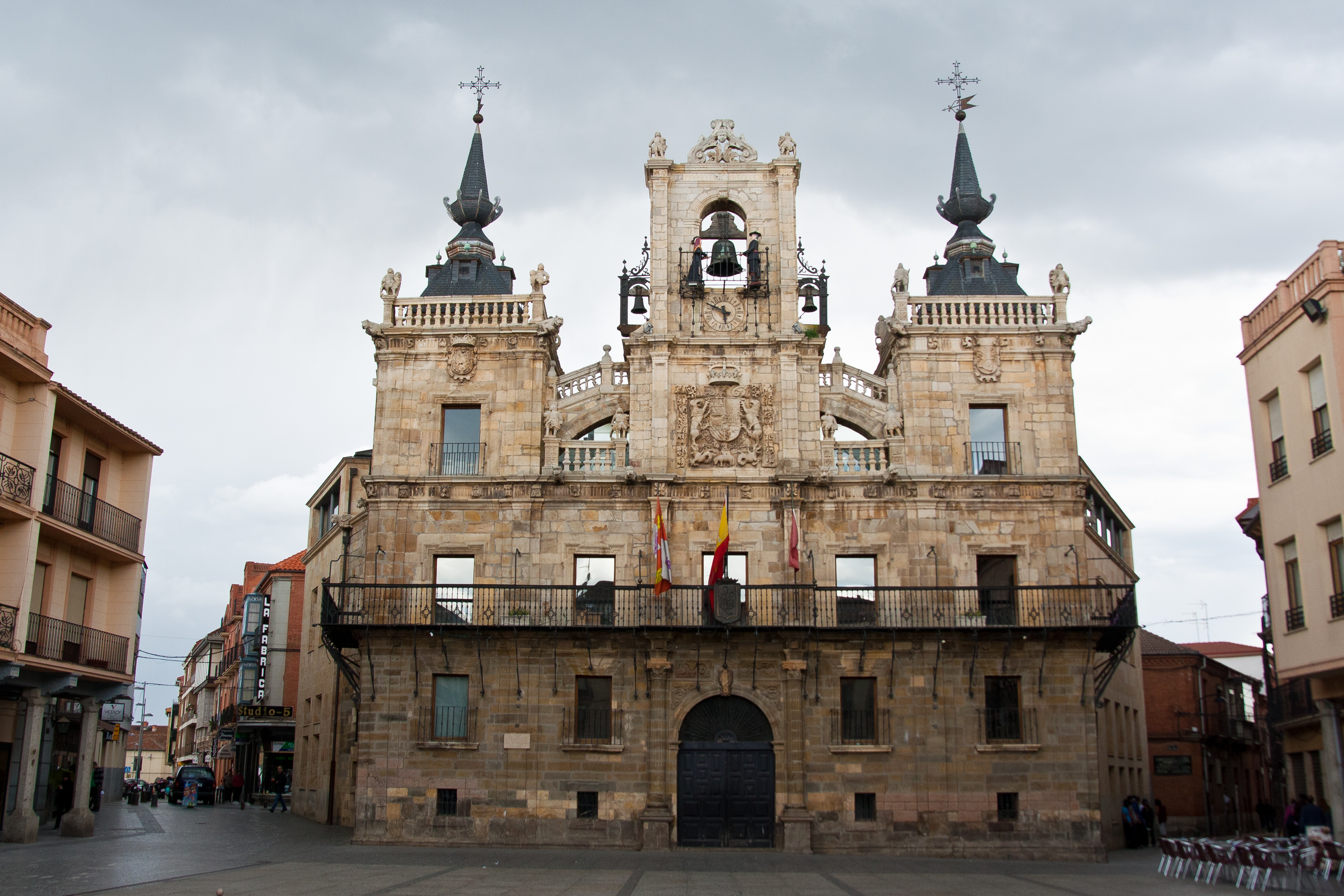
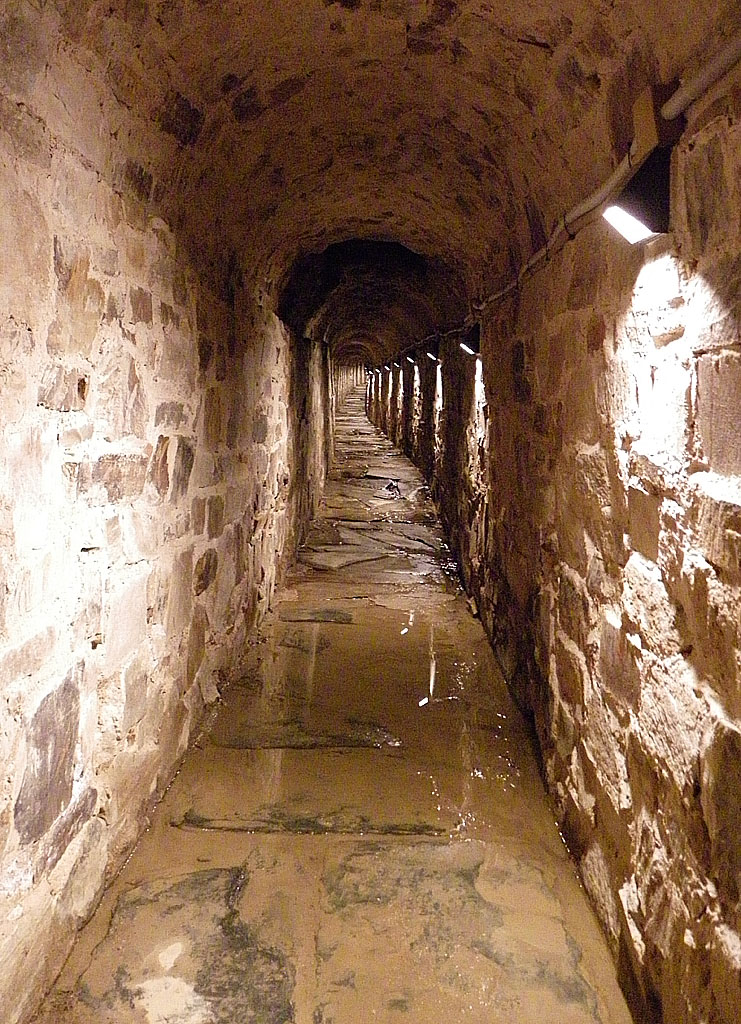
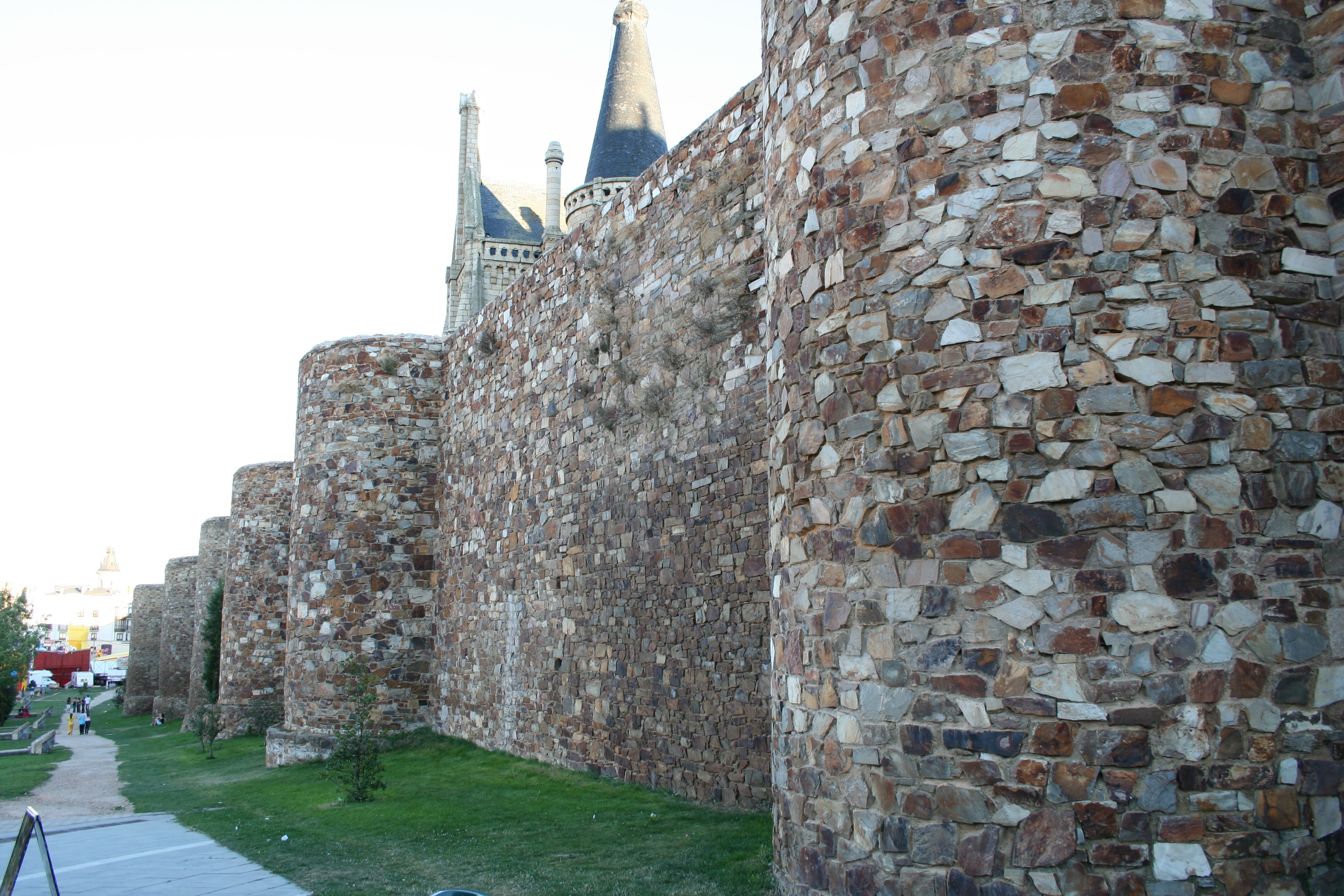
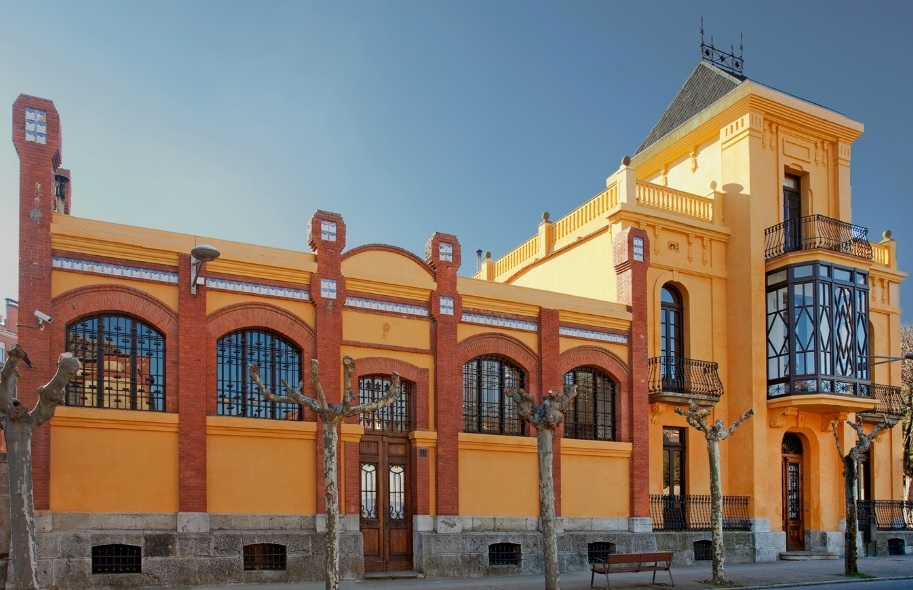
- Cathedral of Saint Mary Episcopal Palace Town Hall Roman Sewers Roman Walls Chocolate Museum

- Flag Coat of arms
- Motto: Very noble, loyal, meritorious, magnificent, and august
- Location in Spain
- Coordinates: 42°27′32″N 6°3′48″W
- Country: Spain
- Autonomous community: Castile and León
- Province: León
- Comarca: Tierra de Astorga (Note: Part of the municipal territory is included in the Maragatería region.)
- Judicial district: Astorga
- Population nuclei: Astorga, Castrillo de los Polvazares, Murias de Rechivaldo, Santa Catalina de Somoza, and Valdeviejas
- Established: 35 AD

Government
  - Mayor: José Luis Nieto (PP)

Area
  - Total: 46.78 km^{2} (18.06 sq mi)
- Elevation: 869 m (2,851 ft)

Population (2025-01-01)
  - Total: 10,305
  - Density: 220.3/km^{2} (570.5/sq mi)
- Demonym(s): Astorgano, -a (Note: Although less common, the term Asturicense, derived from the ancient Asturica Augusta, is also used.)
- Time zone: UTC+1 (CET)
  - Summer (DST): UTC+2 (CEST)
- Postal code: 24700
- Dialing code: 987
- Climate: Csb
- Budget: €9,200,000
- Patron saint: Saint Turibius (April 16)
- Patroness: Saint Marta (February 23)
- Website: Official website

Astorga (Spanish: [asˈtoɾɣa], Estorga in the Leonese dialect of Maragatería) is a municipality and city in Spain, located in the Province of León, within the autonomous community of Castile and León. Situated at the transition between the Páramo Leonés and the Montes de León, it serves as a central hub for the regions of Maragatería, La Cepeda, and the Ribera del Órbigo. The city is the seat of one of Spain's oldest and most extensive dioceses, with jurisdiction over half of the province of León and parts of the provinces of Ourense and Zamora. It is also the head of the judicial district number 5 of the province of León.

Founded as a Roman military camp for the Legio X Gemina in the late 1st century BC, it soon transitioned into a civilian settlement known as Asturica Augusta and became the capital of the Conventus Asturum. It developed as a key communication hub in northwestern Iberia and enjoyed prosperity during the first two centuries of the Common Era due to gold mining, earning the description vrbs magnifica from Pliny the Elder. By the mid-3rd century, it likely became an episcopal see, with Basílides as its first bishop. Following the barbarian invasions, it was part of the Kingdom of the Suebi and was captured by Muslim forces under Tariq in 714, though it was reconquered by the Asturian monarchy later that century. In the late 10th century, it faced repeated Muslim assaults led by Almanzor.

From the 11th century, bolstered by the Way of St. James, the city experienced gradual development, with the Church playing a prominent role. In 1465, Henry IV of Castile granted Álvaro Pérez Osorio, Count of Trastámara, Lord of Villalobos, and Castroverde, the title of Marquis of Astorga, transitioning the city from a free status to a feudal condition. In the early 19th century, Astorga suffered the consequences of the French occupation and was among the first cities to rise against the French, with a revolt of peasants and laborers on May 2, 1808. French forces entered the city on December 31 of that year, and the city changed hands multiple times until the French surrendered on August 17, 1812.

Between the mid-19th century and early 20th century, significant industrial growth occurred, driven by the arrival of the railway and the rise of the chocolate industry. This industry, alongside other food sectors such as confectionery and meat processing, remains active, though the local economy primarily relies on the service sector, with administration, commerce, and cultural tourism as key pillars. The latter is supported by the city's rich historical-artistic heritage, including the cathedral, the Episcopal Palace, the town hall, and the Roman ergastula, all designated as Cultural Heritage Sites. Astorga is also a stop on the Way of St. James and a starting point for the Vía de la Plata.

The most notable celebrations include the carnivals—held the first weekend after Ash Wednesday—the Holy Week, declared a Fiesta of National Tourist Interest, the Astures and Romans festival, recognized as a Festival of Regional Tourist Interest, and, intermittently, the Zuiza procession honoring the Clavijo banner and the procession of the Virgin of Castrotierra, brought from its sanctuary 17 kilometers away during drought years.

In 2015, during the UNESCO approval of the extension of the Camino de Santiago in Spain to "Routes of Santiago de Compostela: Camino Francés and Routes of Northern Spain," Spain submitted a "Retrospective Inventory - Associated Components," listing Astorga with associated elements under numbers 1708 to 1772.

== Etymology ==
The name Astorga is a natural and popular evolution of the ancient toponym Asturica. Several theories exist regarding the origin and meaning of Asturica: according to some, such as chronicler Gil González Dávila, it derives from Astyr or Astur, a squire of Memnon who arrived from the East, while others suggest it comes from Astiria, Astirica, or Asturia, a name used during the conquests of Munuza.

Pedro Junco, drawing on texts such as the Dictionary of Covarrubias, wrote in 1635 that the name stemmed from Astu and Orgia, forming Astorgia, meaning "city for celebrating the worship of the gods," specifically Bacchus, which Latinized became Asturica. He also claimed that before Asturica, it was called Rhoma, a Greek synonym for strength.

The city is referenced as Astorica in documents from 878, as Osturga and Austurga in the Codex Calixtinus, and as Astur, Asturius, and Asturia throughout the Middle Ages. In the 19th century, Víctor Gebhardt wrote in his General History of Spain that Astorga was previously called Asturica Amak. In Antonio de Nebrija's dictionary, from the 1734 edition, it is referred to as Asturia and Asturica: "Asturia, a region and city near Portugal" and "Asturica Augusta, a city in Tarraconensis Spain, commonly called Rome."

In any case, Asturica was the ancient capital of the 22 Astures tribes, later receiving the honorific Augusta from Emperor Augustus, who elevated it to the capital of the Asturian Conventus.

== Geography ==
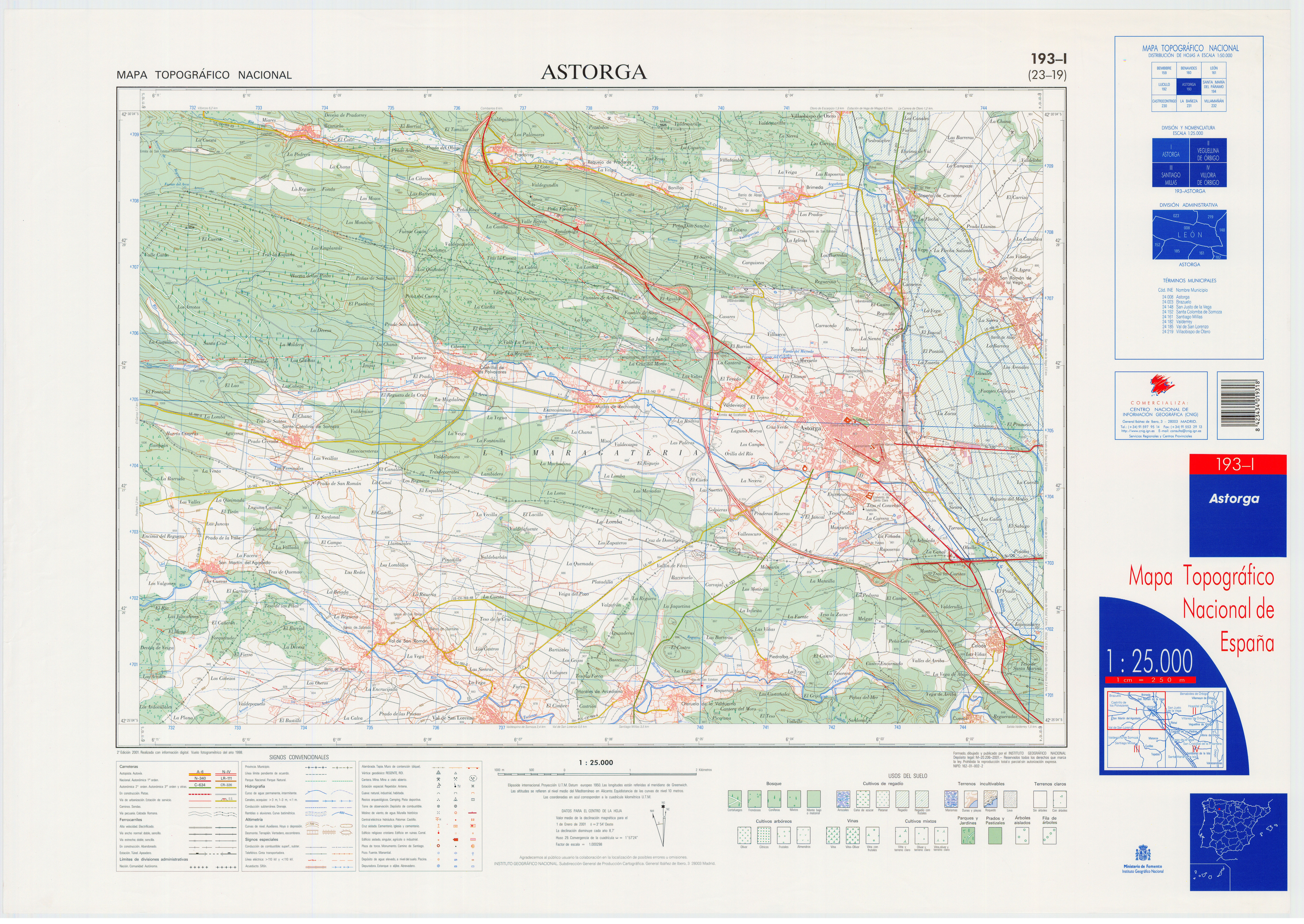
Fragment of sheet 193 of the National Topographic Map of Spain from 2001, showing part of Astorga

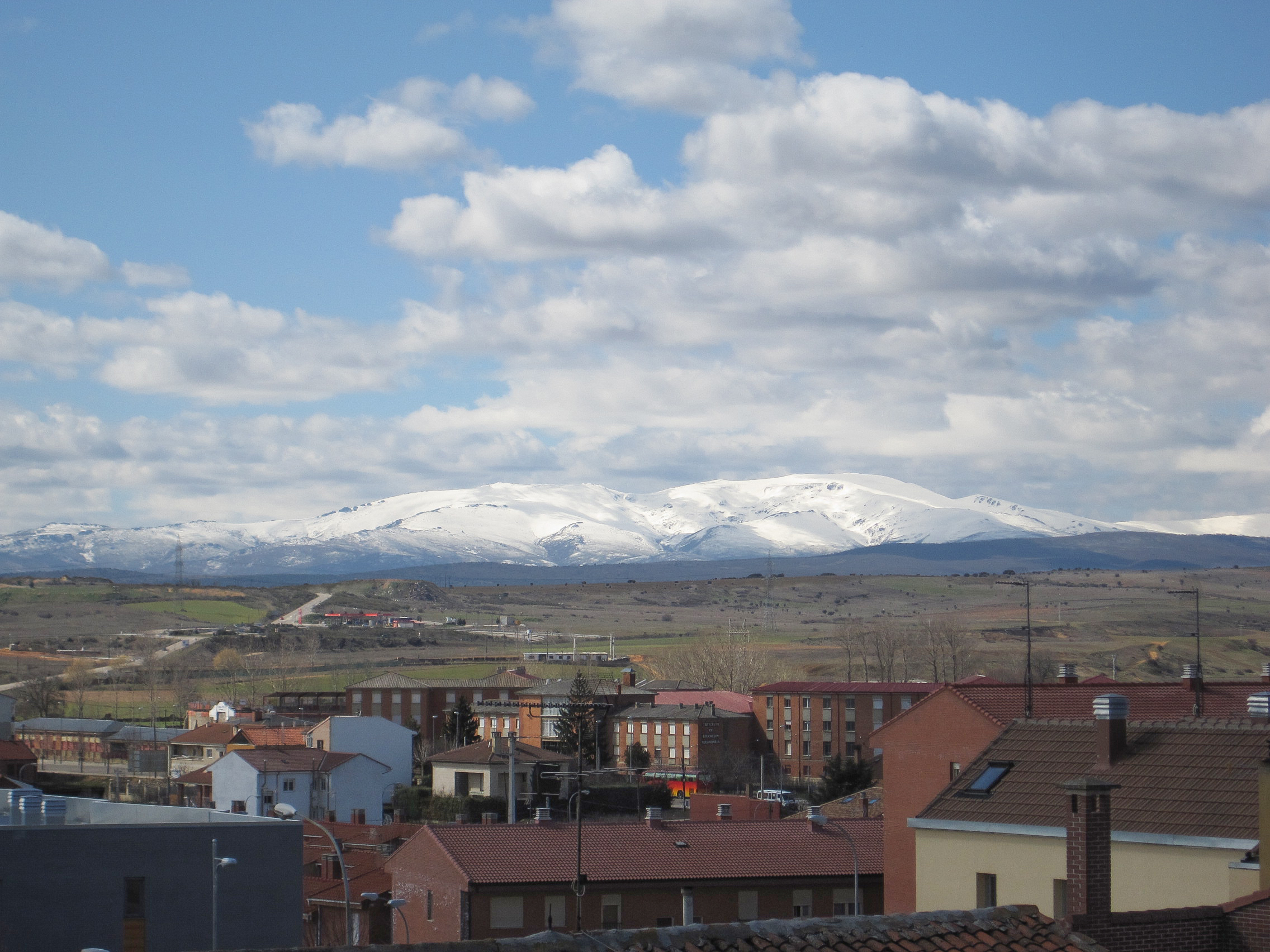
Mount Teleno as seen from Astorga

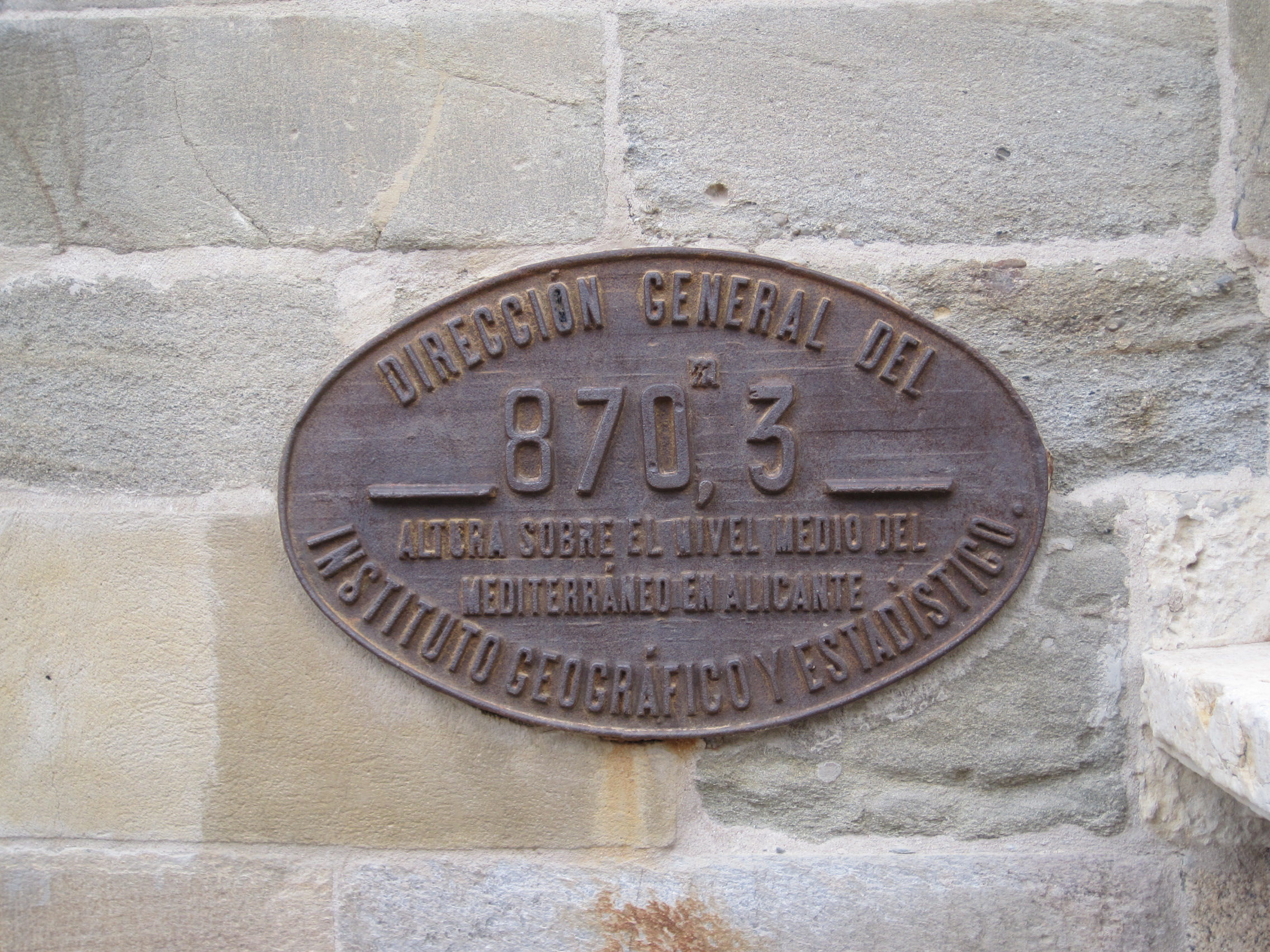
Plaque indicating Astorga's elevation on one of the cathedral's walls

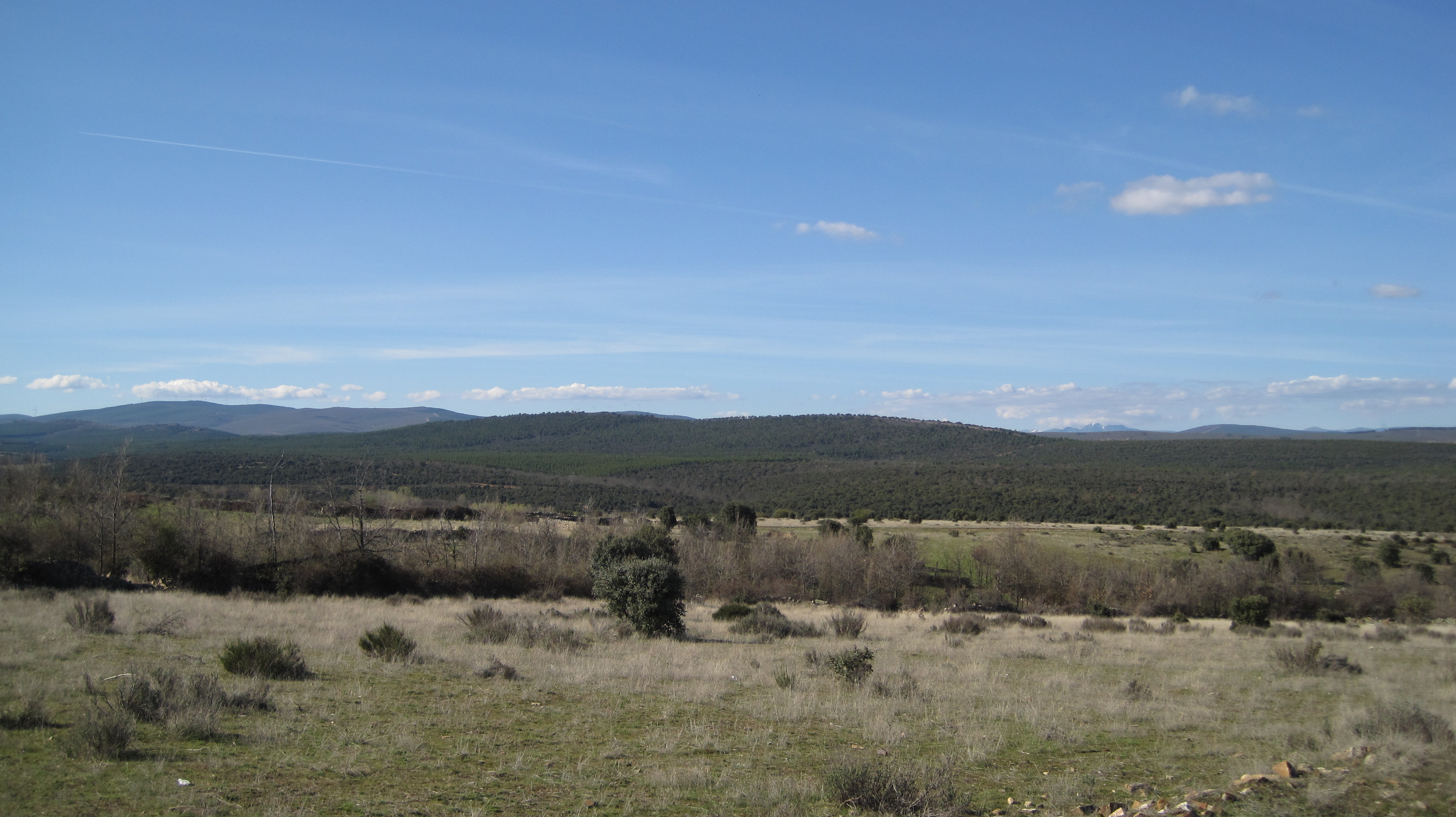
View of Alto del Cuerno (1,114 m)

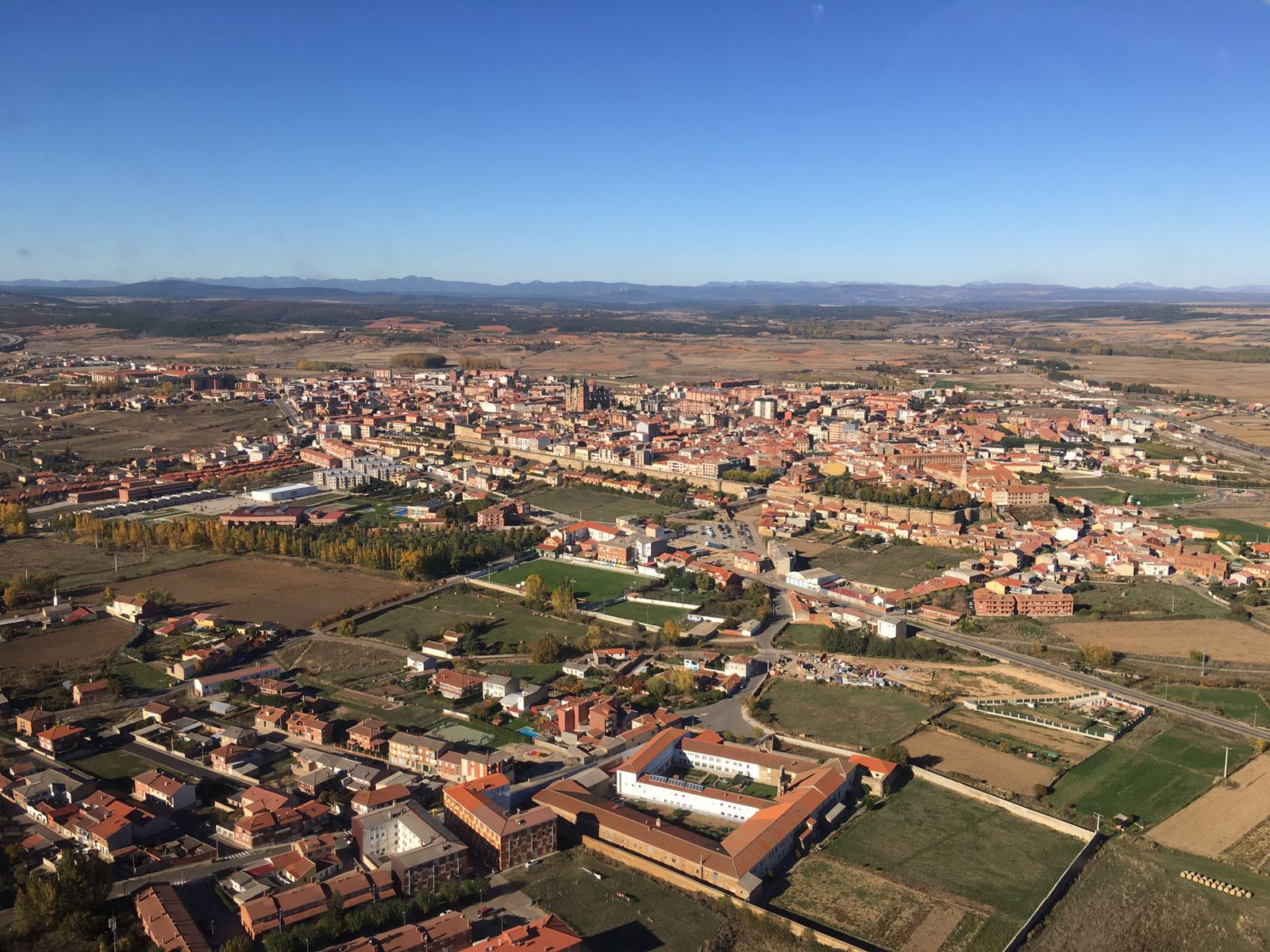
Aerial view of the city

=== Location ===
The municipality of Astorga, covering an area of 46.78 km^{2} (18.06 sq mi), is located in the southwestern part of the central zone of the province of León, at the transition between the Páramo Leonés plain and the Montes de León. This position establishes Astorga as a strategic communication hub, a role evidenced since ancient times as a crossroads of the Camino de Santiago and the Vía de la Plata, and a natural gateway to Galicia. Its territory is divided between the traditional regions of Tierra de Astorga and Maragatería and is represented on sheets MTN50 (scale 1:50,000) 192 and 193 of the National Topographic Map.

=== Topography ===
Astorga lies in the northwestern part of the Duero Basin and generally features gentle terrain, though it is divided into two distinct zones: one area consists of a series of ridges oriented ESE-WNW, composed of materials from the Lower Paleozoic, and the other is the plain of the Tuerto River, with Tertiary materials later covered during the Quaternary. The western zone exhibits a valley morphology with the same ESE-WNW orientation as the Hercynian structures, characterized by flat-bottomed valleys filled with Miocene sediments, while the eastern zone is dominated by alluvial plains and various levels of terraces.

The municipality's average elevation ranges from 830 metres (2,720 ft) above sea level in the floodplains surrounding the city to over 1,000 meters in the westernmost parts. This variation reflects a transition from flat landscapes to elevated terrain with gentle slopes, culminating in peaks such as El Sierro (969 m above sea level), La Cuesta (996 m above sea level), and notably Alto del Cuerno, a geodesic vertex at 1,114 m above sea level. The city itself is situated on a promontory at 870 m above sea level, with its historic core resembling a spur, becoming gentler toward its western end.

=== Hydrography ===
The entire municipality falls within the Duero River Basin; as in much of the province, its waterways are characterized by irregular flow, with low levels in summer and surges in autumn and winter due to rainfall and snowmelt.

The Tuerto River floodplain, a tributary of the Órbigo River, is the most significant in the municipality and extends across its eastern part. However, the Jerga River, originating at Peña del Gato near the Foncebadón Pass, has the longest course within the municipality. It flows through Castrillo de los Polvazares, Murias de Rechivaldo, Astorga, and Celada de la Vega before joining the Tuerto River a few kilometers from Astorga. Other minor waterways include streams such as La Moldera, Val Seco, and Fontanal, which feed into both rivers.

=== Climate ===
The climate in the municipality is classified as continental Mediterranean, with cold winters featuring frequent frosts and warm, dry summers. The annual temperature range is approximately 15 °C, while the daily range can exceed 20 °C. Precipitation is unevenly distributed throughout the year, scarce in summer and concentrated in late autumn, winter, and early spring. The city's elevation, its position above the surrounding area, and exposure to winds contribute to a generally cool climate for much of the year, particularly harsh in winter and spring.

According to the Köppen climate classification, Astorga falls under the Csb variant, a Mediterranean climate with mild summers, where the warmest month's average temperature does not exceed 22 °C but remains above 10 °C for five or more months. This climate is transitional between Mediterranean (Csa) and oceanic (Cfb). The city has a weather station located at El Sierro, managed by the State Meteorological Agency.

Climate data for Astorga
Month	Jan	Feb	Mar	Apr	May	Jun	Jul	Aug	Sep	Oct	Nov	Dec	Year
Mean daily maximum °C (°F)	2.9 (37.2)	4.2 (39.6)	6.8 (44.2)	8.4 (47.1)	12.0 (53.6)	16.6 (61.9)	20.2 (68.4)	19.9 (67.8)	16.5 (61.7)	11.7 (53.1)	6.4 (43.5)	3.8 (38.8)	10.8 (51.4)
Average precipitation mm (inches)	46.2 (1.82)	38.5 (1.52)	29.1 (1.15)	32.1 (1.26)	42.6 (1.68)	32.9 (1.30)	19.6 (0.77)	18.1 (0.71)	29.5 (1.16)	41.6 (1.64)	41.5 (1.63)	40.7 (1.60)	412.4 (16.24)
Source: Ministry of Agriculture, Food and Environment. Precipitation and temperature data (1961-2001)

== Nature ==
=== Geology ===
Geologically, Astorga is situated in the West Asturian-Leonese Zone, southwest of the Navia-Alto Sil Domain. The most prominent lithological materials in the municipality include Quaternary natural aggregates and Miocene clays—traditionally used for both industrial and artisanal ceramics—and Paleozoic quartzites, sandstones, and slates. Over the Miocene alluvial deposits, secondary gold concentrations with low yields are found in both ancient and modern river terraces. Stratigraphically, the western part of the municipality features layers from the Los Cabos Series of the Upper Cambrian and Lower Ordovician, and the Luarca Slates from the Middle Ordovician. Paleozoic outcrops are flanked by Miocene layers, extensively covered by Quaternary sediments that fully overlay the river basins of the Jerga and Tuerto rivers.

=== Flora ===
The municipality of Astorga lies within the supramediterranean bioclimatic zone, with its climax vegetation comprising marcescent species and conifers. These include oak trees, which grow in the cooler, wetter western areas on Quaternary deposits and predominantly siliceous soils, and reforested pine forests, mainly around Alto del Cuerno, featuring species such as Scots pine. Holm oaks are present, often scattered but forming a homogeneous, though degraded, stand between Castrillo de los Polvazares and Murias de Rechivaldo, with stunted trees due to historical use for charcoal and firewood, a practice common across the province. Lower strata include species such as genistas, lavenders, and hare's-foot clover. In areas lacking tree cover, primarily on sunny slopes with poor soil and water scarcity, shrubs such as rosemary, adenocarpus hispanicus, and rockrose dominate. In the Tuerto River floodplain, aside from poplar plantations, aspens, willows, and alders are found. The rest of the municipal territory consists of wastelands and agricultural fields.

=== Fauna ===
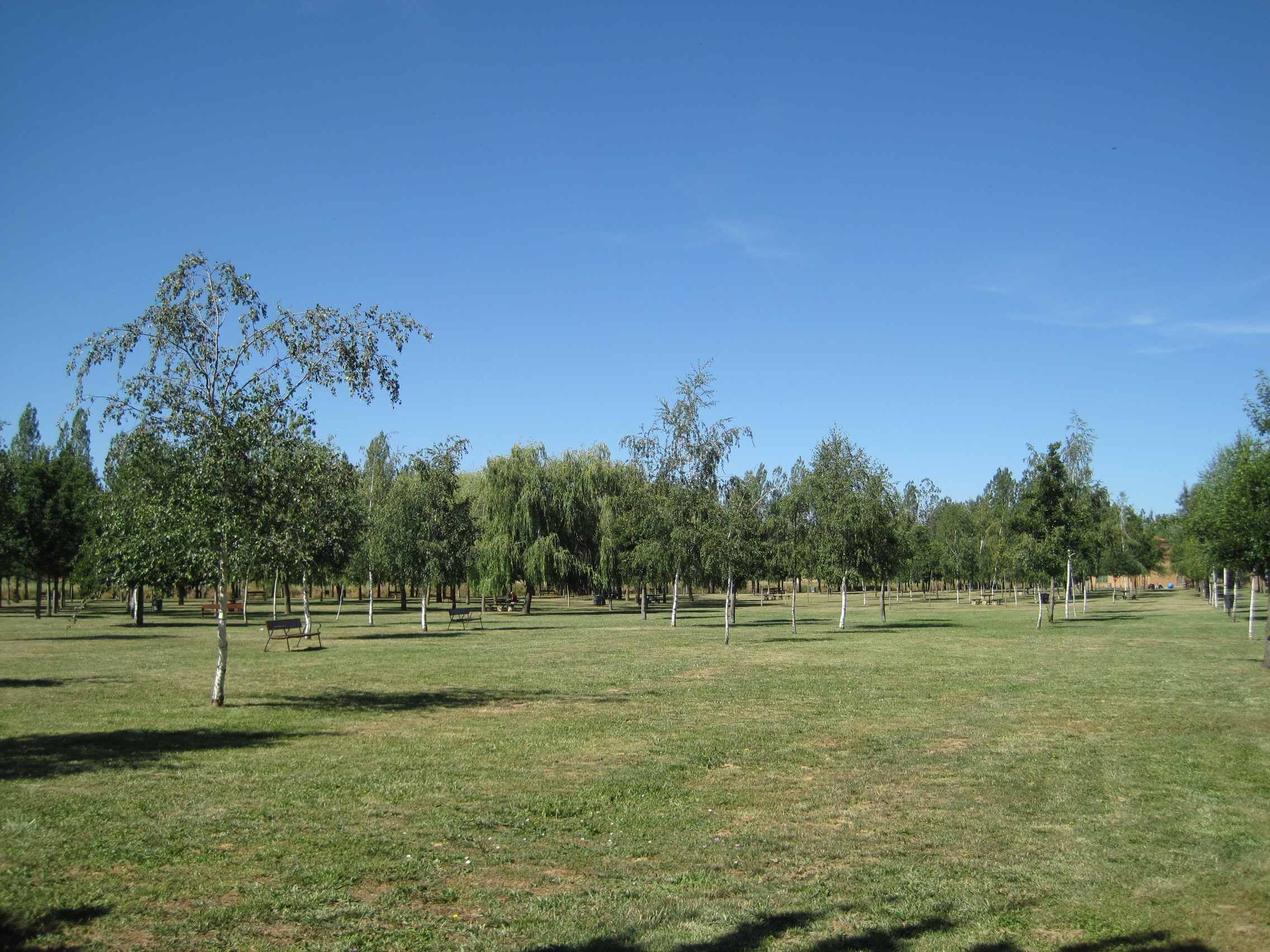
Partial view of La Eragudina Park

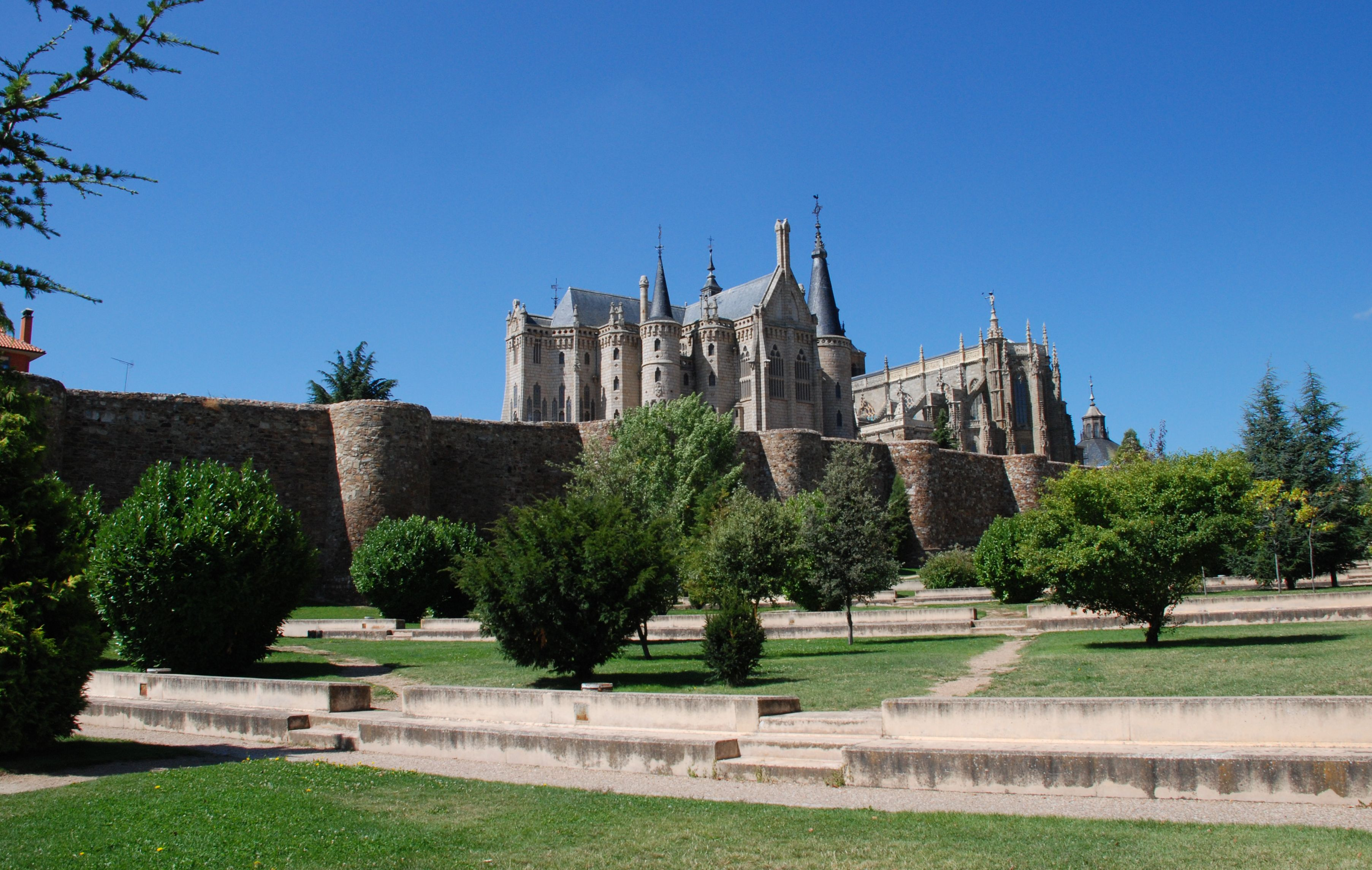
Melgar Park, with the monumental complex in the background

The municipality is home to a rich and varied fauna due to its transitional position between Mediterranean and Eurosiberian ecosystems. Regarding fish, Astorga's waters support only two species: the common barbel and the northern straight-mouth nase, accompanied by mammals such as the otter. Among amphibians and reptiles, species include the common toad, marbled newt, ocellated lizard, Seoane's viper, and Montpellier snake. In the municipality's flat areas, birds such as the kestrel and sparrowhawk, and small mammals such as rabbits and Iberian hares, are found. Near population centers, white storks, swallows, common swifts, wood pigeons, various tits, rooks, and raptors such as the red kite are common. In pastures or wooded areas, species such as the red partridge, roe deer, weasel, fox, wild boar, and occasionally wolves are present.

== History ==
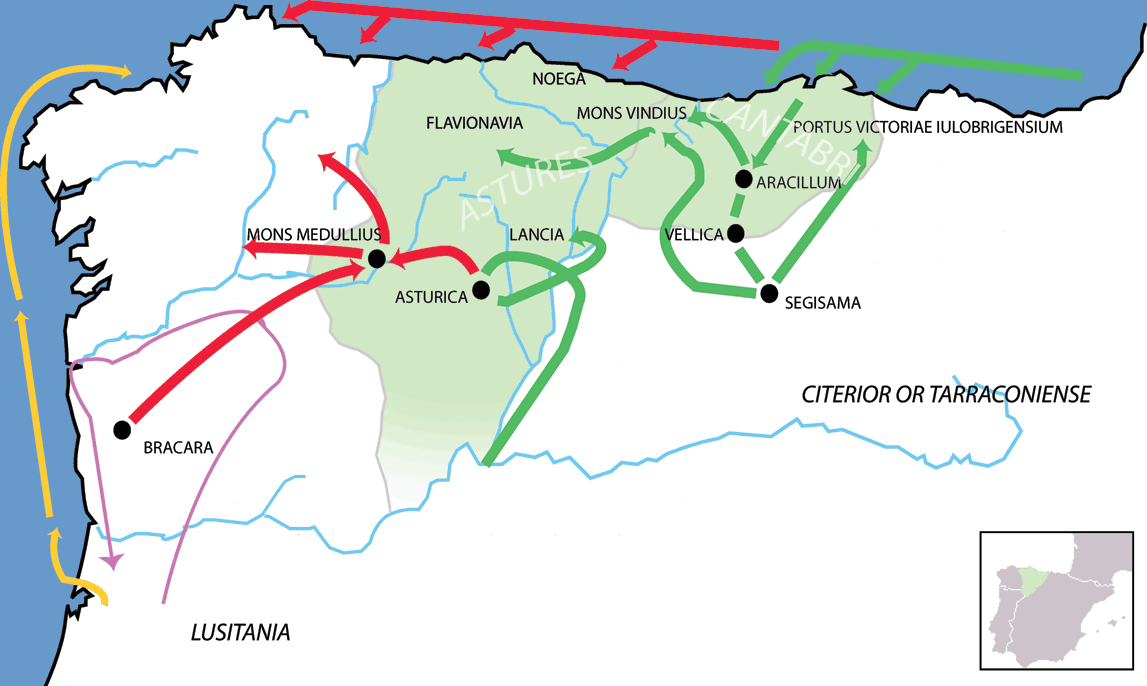
Roman military operations during the Cantabrian Wars Campaign of c. 25 BC Campaign of c. 26 BC Campaign of Julius Caesar of c. 61 BC Campaign of Decimus Junius Brutus of c. 137 BC

=== Ancient era ===
The history of Astorga theoretically dates back to the pre-Roman period, as the Greco-Egyptian geographer Ptolemy referred to Asturica as a city of the Astures and capital of the Amachians. This has led researchers such as Manuel Gómez-Moreno Martínez and José María Luengo Martínez to suggest an indigenous origin. However, archaeological excavations in the urban area have not yielded materials to confirm such origins. Thus, a pre-Roman settlement cannot be scientifically affirmed, despite the presence of several Iron Age castra in the surrounding area, such as La Mesa in Castrillo de los Polvazares.

Based on archaeological evidence, the city's foundation is linked to a detachment of the Legio X Gemina during the Cantabrian Wars. This is evidenced by the discovery of two defensive trenches and several foundation ditches for possible wooden structures. After the campaigns of Augustus against the Astures and Cantabri, between c. 29 BC and c. 19 BC, the camp was established, and following pacification, it transitioned into a civilian settlement within the Tarraconensis province. This shift likely occurred in the early 1st century, as evidenced by the hospitality pact with the Zoelae in 27 AD, indicating stabilized Roman-indigenous relations.

Around the transition between the reigns of Claudius and Vespasian, the city became the capital of the Conventus Iuridicus Asturum and a major recipient of gold from mines such as Las Médulas. This prosperity led Pliny the Elder, then procurator of Hispania Citerior, to describe the city in his Naturalis Historia as vrbs magnifica. With the territorial reorganization in the 3rd century, the city became part of the Gallaecia province, with Bracara Augusta (Braga) as its capital. The decline of mining under Diocletian marked the beginning of the city's decline.

By the mid-3rd century, Astorga likely became an episcopal see, with Basílides as its first bishop around 249. The spread of Christianity faced challenges from barbarian invasions and the rise of Priscillianist and Manichean doctrines, which were later opposed by Hydatius and Saint Turibius.

=== Middle Ages ===
In 1465, Henry IV of Castile granted Álvaro Pérez Osorio the title of Marquis of Astorga

Following the barbarian invasions, the Suebi established themselves in the former Gallaecia around 410, and Astorga became part of their kingdom. Conflicts with the Visigoths led to sacks by Theodoric II in 456 and Leovigild in 569. This resulted in the loss of its status as the capital of the conventus, with the Roman political and administrative system collapsing, and prominence shifting to León. In 714, during the Muslim conquest of the Iberian Peninsula, Astorga was attacked and destroyed by Tariq en route north. The Muslims named it إشطرقة (Ishṭarqa). After the emergence of the Kingdom of Asturias in the mid-8th century, King Alfonso I of Asturias reconquered Astorga among other cities for the Christians. Ordoño I of Asturias, who ascended the throne in 850, tasked Count Gatón with the city's repopulation and reconstruction.

Years later, the five sons of Alfonso III of Asturias rebelled against him, leading to the division of the crown upon his abdication. García I of León, who received León, established his court in Astorga for four years until his death in 914. After this, Ordoño II of León moved the capital to León, marking the birth of the Kingdom of León. In 988, León was sacked by Almanzor, prompting, according to Víctor Gebhardt, a temporary relocation of the court to Astorga. Astorga itself suffered sieges and plunder by Almanzor's forces in 988, 994, and 996.

In 1034, Sancho III of Pamplona captured Astorga and the rest of León amid disputes with Bermudo III of León. In 1073, the tenure system was established as a form of governance. In the early 12th century, it was occupied by Theresa, Countess of Portugal, who took advantage of the disputes between her sister Urraca I of León and Alfonso I of Aragon. In 1143, it became the domain of her son, Afonso I of Portugal.

During the reign of Ferdinand III of Castile, territorial administration shifted from tenencias to lordships. For Astorga, this occurred around 1277, but in 1345, Alfonso XI of Castile decided the city would be governed by a magistrate and several councilmen.

From 1367 to the end of the century, Astorga faced a crisis due to the plague, conflicts between Peter I of Castile and Henry II of Castile, and economic hardship. During this period, Astorgan merchants maintained trade with various Galician towns, possibly laying the foundation for future muleteering.

On July 16, 1465, through a privilege granted in Toro, Henry IV of Castile awarded Álvar Pérez Osorio, Count of Trastámara, Lord of Villalobos, and Castroverde, the title of Marquis of Astorga, shifting the city to a feudal status. The marquisate exerted significant influence over the city's governance, impacting areas controlled by the cathedral chapter.

=== Early modern period ===
The 16th century was marked, in its early years, by the Comuneros War (1520–1521); Astorga sided with the royalists, as the marquis supported Charles I. This period saw the establishment of numerous confraternities that aided the poor and pilgrims through hospitals, a practice reinforced by the Camino de Santiago's passage through the city. This tradition of hospitality is preserved in institutions such as the San Juan Bautista and the Cinco Llagas hospitals. The Church's influence was pervasive, not only through moral authority but also because the cathedral chapter owned extensive rural and urban properties.

The arrival of the printing press in 1545, introduced by Agustín de Paz, boosted written production, initially focused on missals and ecclesiastical works such as Francisco de Evia's Thesaurus Angelorum. This marked the start of a printing tradition with figures such as Antonio de la Calzada, peaking in the late 19th century and early 20th century, when Astorga had more printing presses than the provincial capital, including those of Antonio Gullón, Juan Alonso, Porfirio López, Nicesio Fidalgo, González Revillo, and Ortiz.

During the 18th century, the city achieved some prosperity, with daily life featuring jousting with canes, bullfights in the Plaza Mayor, bowling—regulated in 1601—theatrical performances, and sacramental functions. Between the 18th century and 19th century, Astorga's territory was affected by the division of the province into cantons and jurisdictions, later modified during the Peninsular War.

=== Modern era ===
In the early 19th century, the city's growth stalled due to epidemics and the French occupation. Astorga was among the first cities to revolt against the French, with a peasant and laborer uprising on May 2, 1808. In June, the Junta of Armament and Defense was formed. French forces entered on December 31, 1808, and the city changed hands multiple times, with heroic defenses led by General José María Santocildes, until the French surrendered on August 17, 1812, following a strategy by Generals Castaños and Wellesley. General Santocildes documented these events in his Historical Summary of the Attacks, Siege, and Surrender of Astorga.

After Ferdinand VII of Spain's restoration, he abolished the 1812 Constitution, reverting to absolutism, a move welcomed by Astorga's ecclesiastical, noble, and bourgeois sectors. The influence of the bishopric and cathedral chapter persisted through the 19th century and 20th century. During Joseph Bonaparte's brief rule, a new territorial organization was proposed, with Astorga heading the Esla Department. This plan failed, and in 1820, during the Trienio Liberal, a new division made Astorga one of the province's eleven districts, but this was annulled in 1823. In 1833, with the new territorial reorganization, Astorga and Maragatería were incorporated into the Province of León.

During Isabel II of Spain's reign and after the 1845 Constitution, Astorga was represented by the progressive Santiago Alonso Cordero. In subsequent decades, other representatives included Pío Gullón Iglesias, part of the political alternative to Antonio Cánovas del Castillo, and Manuel García Prieto, who served as prime minister several times, the last in 1922, before Miguel Primo de Rivera's coup.

With the outbreak of the Spanish Civil War on July 18, 1936, after miners' columns passed through toward Asturias, the Civil Guard and military took control of Astorga on July 20, keeping it—along with most of the province—in rebel territory. The Transition and democracy's arrival spurred further development, diversifying the economy through tourism, increased road transport, and revitalization as a regional hub.

== Religion ==
Religion has consistently shaped Astorga's historical development. No evidence of indigenous deities is recorded in Astorgan territory, likely due to its Roman military origin, but the presence of the god Caraedudi is noted in Cuevas—near Celada de la Vega— and a plaque dedicated to Marti Tileno was found in Quintana del Marco.

=== Paganism ===
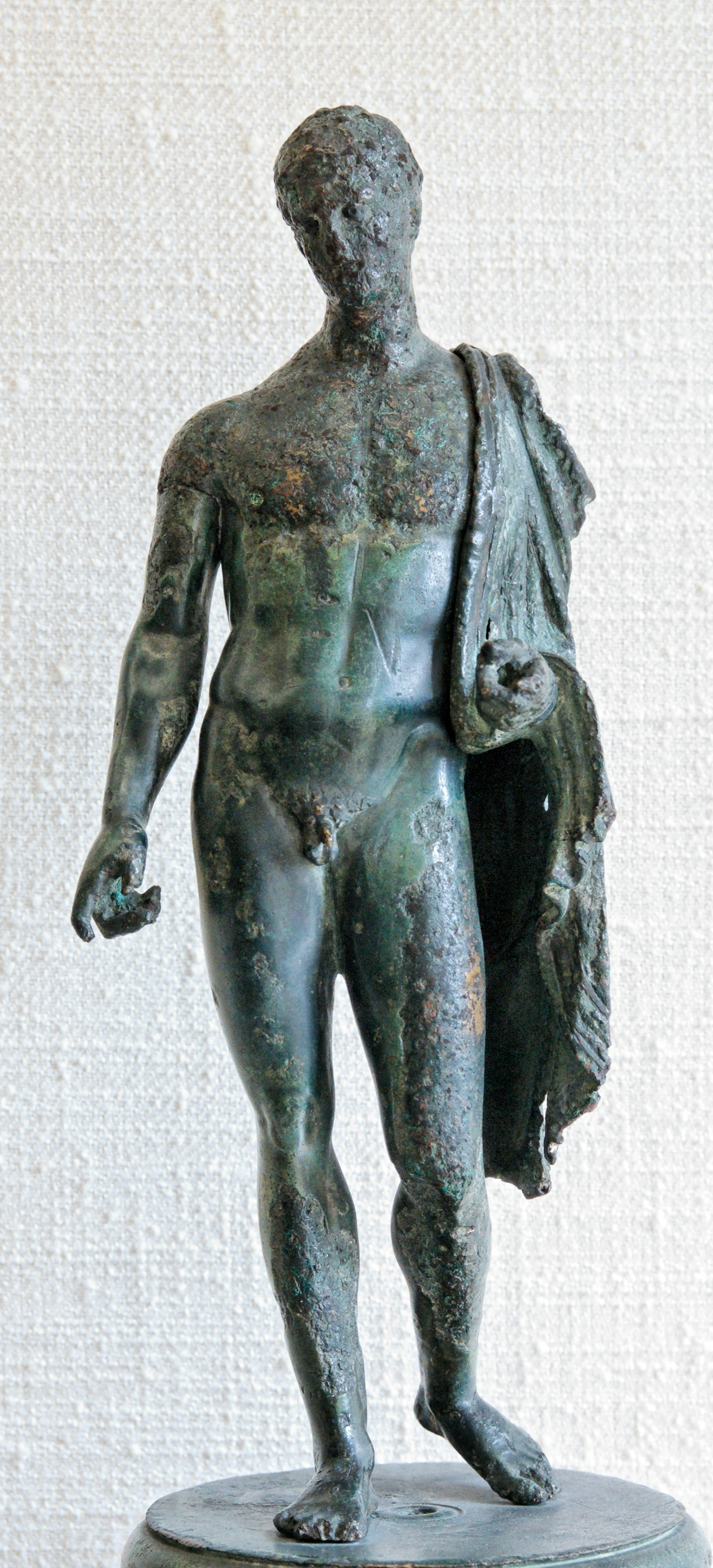
Mercury was among the gods worshipped in Astorga

Roman and Greek Gods

With the establishment of the Roman camp, both Roman and Greek gods were adopted in religious practice, with evidence of the following cults in the city:

- Mars, the war god aiding the camp, known in Astorga as Gradivus—also associated with crop growth—and Sagatus, referencing the soldiers' sagum or campaign cloak.
- Mercury, god of commerce and roads, with a single representation found on a secondary route from Astorga to the Las Médulas gold mines.
- Worship of the Emperor and worship of the Empress, natural for a capital of the Conventus Juridicus, housing numerous officials.
- Julia Domna, revered as the mother of the emperor, senate, camp, and homeland, worshipped through the goddesses Minerva and Juno.
- Proserpina, daughter of Ceres, known in Astorga as Invicta.
- Apollo, protector of the emperor, associated in Astorga with the Celtic god Grannus, meaning "garnet", "bright as scarlet", or "shining like the sun", with a sanctuary in Trier.

Representations of Asclepius and his son Telesphorus, linked to medicine and healing, have also been found.

Oriental gods

Due to its status as a conventus capital and home to senior imperial officials, dedications to Eastern gods appeared in the late 2nd century and early 3rd century, introduced by the Severan dynasty and high-ranking Eastern officials such as Ioul or Silvanos Melanion, sometimes inscribed in Greek.

- Isis, depicted with the Greek epithet Myronimo—thousand names—symbolizing her roles as protector of the land, food producer, patron of childbirth, and women's health.
- Mithra, Persian sun god absorbed by Rome, referenced in Astorga by inscriptions such as Invicto Deo and Soli Invicto.
- Serapis, an Egyptian god often paired with Isis, associated with health and healing, honored with amulets and ex-votos.

=== Christianity and the Episcopal See ===
Until Christianity's arrival, religion in Astorga was polytheistic. With Christianity, monotheism emerged, along with churches dedicated to revered saints such as Saint Martin, Saint Acisclus, Saint Christopher, and Saint Martha.

Records confirm that Decencius, Bishop of León, attended the Council of Elvira between 295 and 314, where 37 Iberian bishops gathered, indicating that León and Astorga jointly formed one of the earliest Christian sees in Hispania. After the Edict of Milan in 313, León's military character made it heavily influenced by Mithraism, popular among soldiers, and the episcopal see was relocated solely to Astorga. By then, Astorga had lost political influence due to Diocletian's provincial reorganization, which stripped it of its conventus capital status; (Note: This capital status passed to Bracara Augusta.) the transfer of the diocese helped maintain its prominence, now in the religious sphere. (Note: The most significant Christian artifact from this new episcopal see is a sarcophagus decorated with six scenes from the Old and New Testaments, imported from Rome.)

Documents provide evidence of Astorga's bishops from 380, when Simposius attended the first Council of Zaragoza. Astorgan bishops participated in the various Councils of Toledo, starting with Dictinius. Discussions included the maintenance and worship of rural churches, many of which survived as medieval hermitages and sanctuaries, such as the Virgin of Castrotierra hermitage, located at an ancient Iron Age site.

Besides conciliar records, Hydatius's Chronicle documents Astorgan bishops throughout the 5th century. During Saint Turibius's episcopate (440–480), invasions by Suebi, Vandals, and Alans, as well as Visigothic attacks led to the destruction of Astorgan churches. During Turibius's tenure, the Manichean heresy emerged, addressed at the Astorgan Council of 456, followed by Arianism around 585, until Reccared's conversion to Christianity in 589 at the Third Council of Toledo, under Bishop Talasius. Astorgan bishops attended all subsequent Councils of Toledo, up to the XVI Council in 693. (Note: Three heresies emerged in Astorga's Christian church: Manichaeism, Priscillianism, and Arianism.)

In the Middle Ages, the diocese was restructured. During the repopulation period, Christian life was revitalized, and several churches and monasteries emerged within the city, including those of Saint Christopher, Saint Julian and Saint Basilisa, Saint Acisclus, Saint Salvador, Saint Thomas, Saint Martin, Saint Isidore, and Saint Peter. Outside the city, the San Dictino monastery was founded. In the 11th century, the Santa María Cathedral, several churches, and the San Juan Bautista hospital were built, along with additional churches, the Santa Clara monastery, and the Santo Tomás Cantuariense hospital outside the city.

Below is a list of Astorga's bishops who attended various councils in Hispania, as documented by the councils' records:

- Polibius attended the first Council of Braga in 561.
- Talasius attended the Third Council of Toledo in 589.
- Concordius attended the Fourth Council of Toledo in 633.
- Oscandus attended the Sixth Council of Toledo in 638.
- Presbyter Paul, representing Bishop Candidatus, attended the Seventh Council of Toledo in 646.
- Bishop Candidatus attended the Eighth Council of Toledo in 653.
- Elpidius attended the Tenth Council of Toledo in 656.
- Isidore attended the Third Council of Braga.
- Abbot Leopardo, representing Bishop Aurelius, attended the Thirteenth Council of Toledo in 683.
- Aurelius attended the Fifteenth Council of Toledo in 688.
- Aurelius attended the Sixteenth Council of Toledo in 693.

Subsequent records of the diocese and its bishops relate to the city's repopulation and the restoration of the bishopric during the Reconquista. The Diocese of Astorga has been under the jurisdiction of the Archdiocese of Oviedo since 1954.

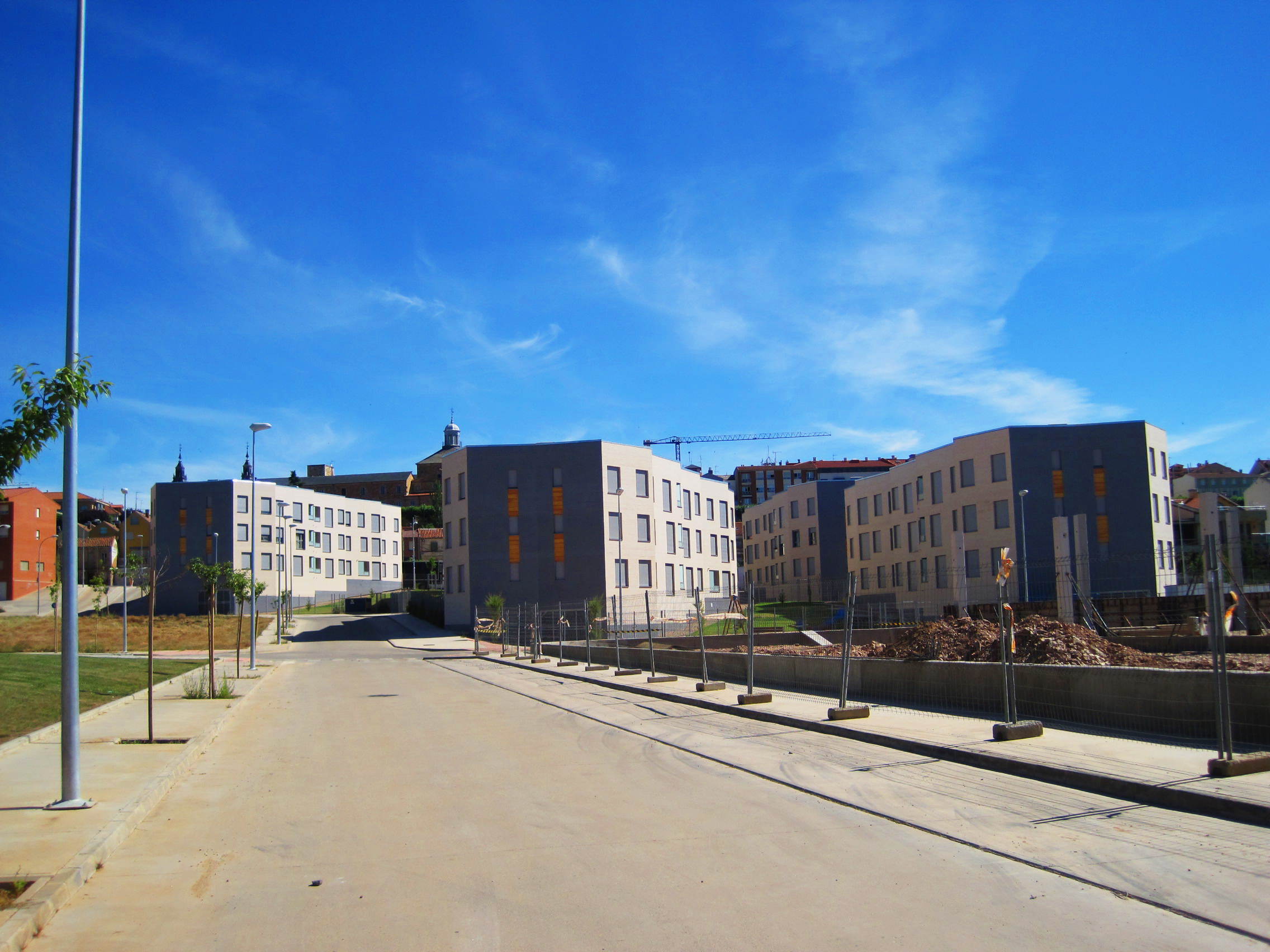
Population growth has been stagnant in recent years. Pictured are newly constructed apartment blocks

== Demographics ==
The municipality has a population of 10,308 inhabitants (INE 2024). Unlike cities such as León and Ponferrada, Astorga has not significantly attracted residents from surrounding regions and grew slowly during the 20th century, reaching its peak in 1981, though the 1940 figure was inflated by the presence of soldiers and prisoners from the Civil War.

Since the 1980s, the city has experienced a slight but steady population decline due to aging demographics, fewer births, and emigration to more dynamic centers. In 2011, Astorga ranked 25th among Spain's 100 municipalities with the highest median age, at 46.63 years compared to the national average of 44.1.

Demographic evolution of Astorga between 1842 and 2021

Year	Pop.	±%
1842	2,853	—
1857	4,804	+68.4%
1860	4,830	+0.5%
1877	4,749	−1.7%
1887	5,248	+10.5%
1897	5,497	+4.7%
1900	5,696	+3.6%

Year	Pop.	±%
1910	5,937	+4.2%
1920	6,659	+12.2%
1930	8,041	+20.8%
1940	13,952	+73.5%
1950	9,032	−35.3%
1960	9,152	+1.3%
1970	11,103	+21.3%

Year	Pop.	±%
1981	12,757	+14.9%
1991	12,500	−2.0%
2001	12,242	−2.1%
2011	11,801	−3.6%
2021	10,561	−10.5%

1857 and 1860: De facto population according to the INE population censuses.

All other years: De jure population according to the INE population censuses.

In 1975, the municipality's boundaries expanded due to the incorporation of Castrillo de los Polvazares.

Foreign population

In 2022, the registered foreign population totaled 484, with the most numerous nationalities being Moroccan (174), Bulgarian (51), Portuguese (34), Venezuelan (33), Romanian (25), Colombian (19), Chinese (17), Argentine (12), and Pakistani (12).

Population distribution

The populated areas within the municipality of Astorga are as follows:

Populated areas of Astorga
Populated areas	Coordinates	Pop. (2024)
Astorga	42°27′32″N 6°03′48″W	9,910
Castrillo de los Polvazares	42°27′54″N 6°07′43″W	97
Murias de Rechivaldo	42°27′37″N 6°06′15″W	104
Santa Catalina de Somoza	42°27′16″N 6°09′31″W	46
Valdeviejas	42°27′41″N 6°04′44″W	135
Total		10,292
Source: INE, 2024

== Urban planning ==
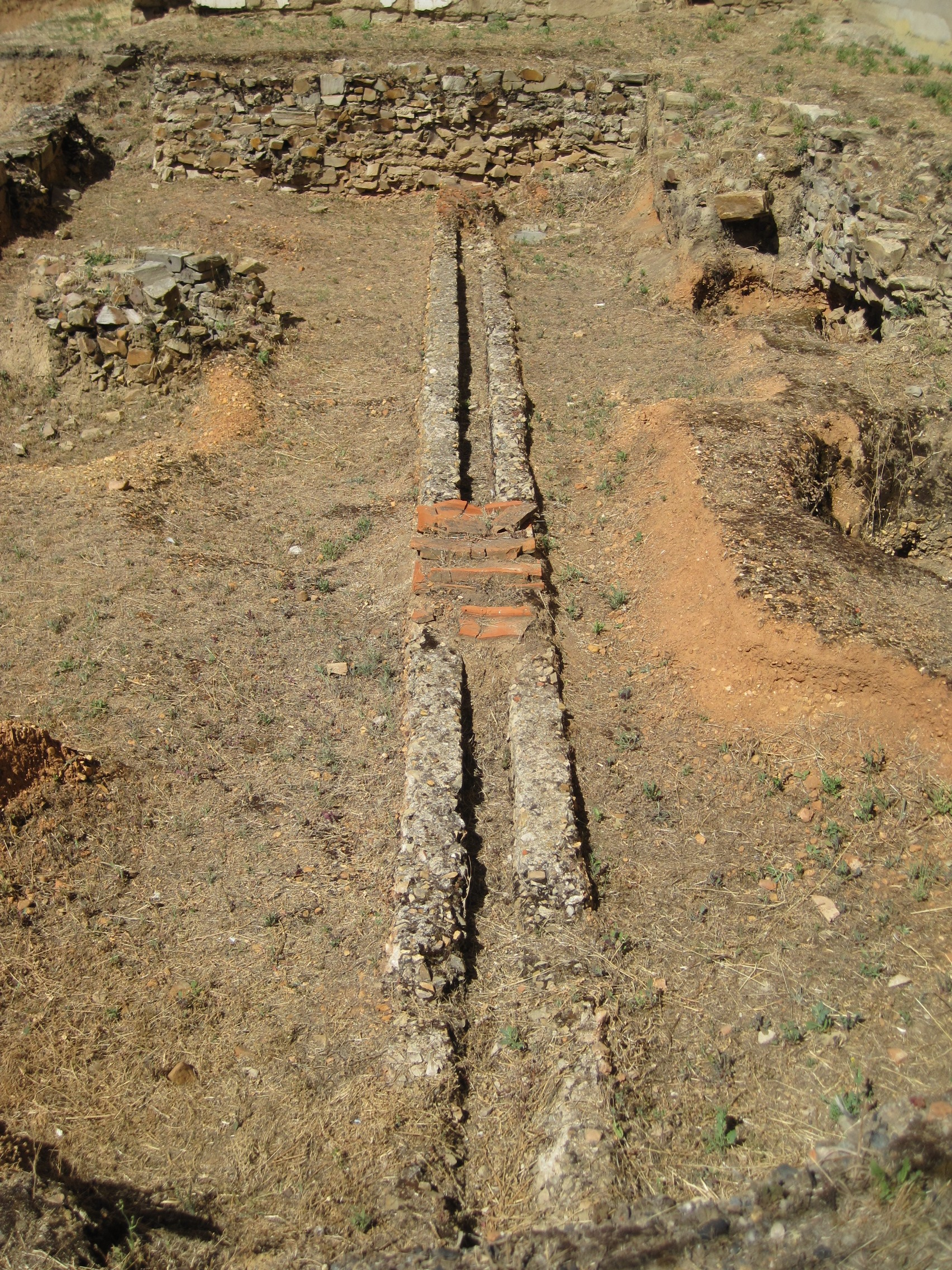
The first water channeling system was built in Roman times

=== The ancient city ===
The urban planning of Astorga has historically been shaped by the terrain's topography, with the settlement established in ancient times atop a natural ridge. After the Cantabrian Wars ended and the military camp transitioned into an urban center, the city experienced a period of growth driven by the development of mining activities, which peaked between the 1st century and 3rd century. This led to Astorga becoming the seat of the concillium (a meeting of delegates from indigenous tribes), the imperial cult, and the Conventus Asturicensis. The city spanned 26 hectares, enclosed by a city wall over two kilometers long. The enclosure's shape was not rectangular due to a narrowing of the ridge at its southern corner, resulting in a triangular layout where the forum was located. Public buildings were erected, streets—some with porticos—were paved, and a sewer network was constructed, alongside sophisticated domestic architecture. By the 3rd century, Astorga's role as an episcopal see further defined the city's life in subsequent centuries.

With the fall of the Western Roman Empire, Astorga, like many other urban centers, experienced a period of decline that lasted until the Early Middle Ages, when recovery began. By then, the urban core—still enclosed within its walls—consisted of houses with straw and tile roofs built over the original Roman layout.

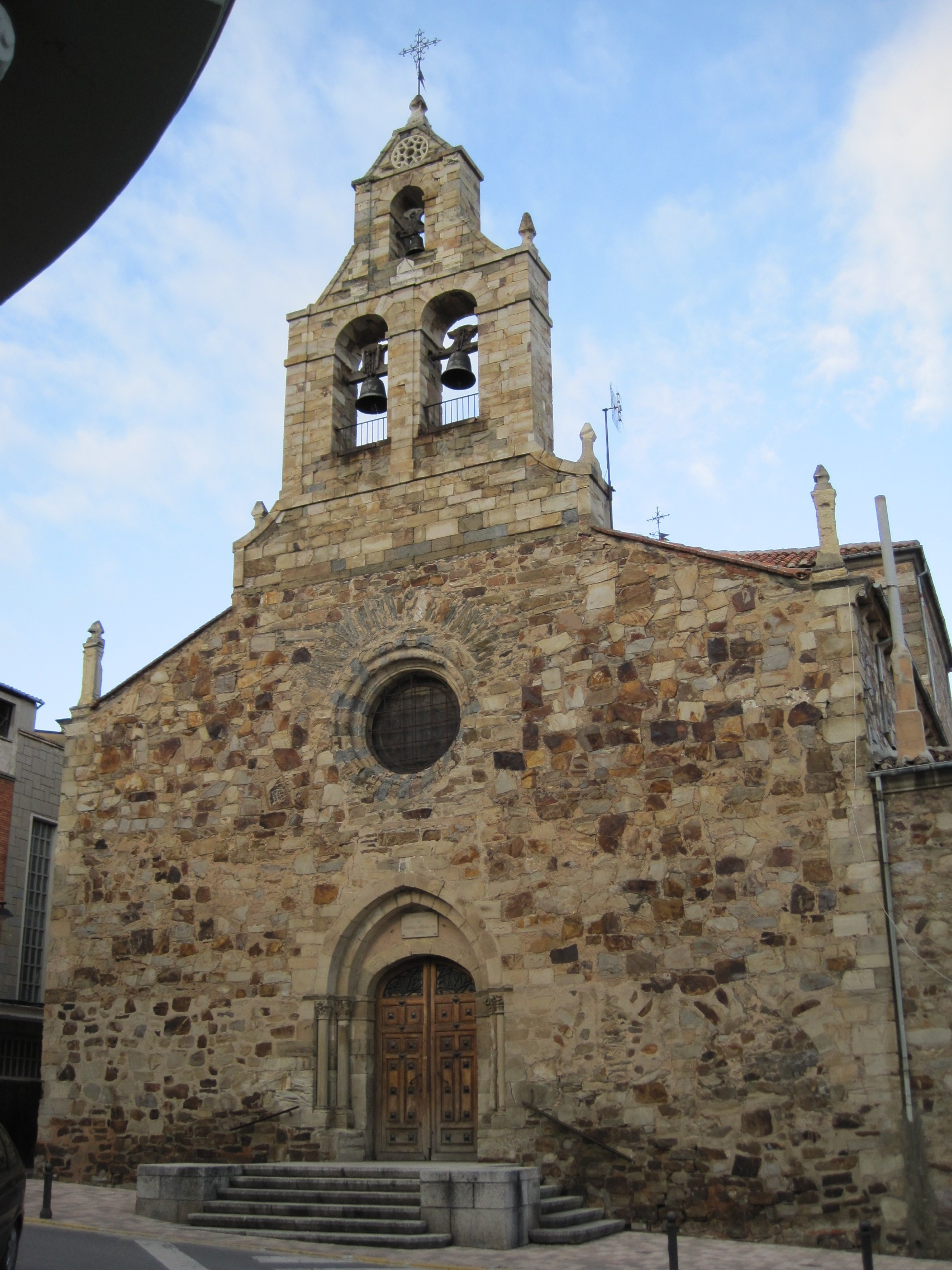
During the medieval period, numerous religious buildings were constructed. Pictured is the former church of San Julián

=== The medieval city ===
In the 9th century, the repopulation policies of Ordoño I led to a population increase over several decades, resulting in the emergence of new neighborhoods and the clearing of nearby lands. During the 12th century and 13th century, new churches began replacing the earlier high-medieval monasteries, which were gradually disappearing. Two key factors shaped the city during the medieval period: the contributions of the Jewish population, which built a synagogue, a cistern, and a cemetery, and the development of the Camino de Santiago, which spurred the construction of hospitals. The urban landscape featured contiguous buildings along narrow streets, plots, orchards, and religious enclosures; by the 12th century, houses typically included a courtyard, wine press, cellar, granary, dovecote, and garden.

The construction of religious buildings continued in subsequent centuries; by the 15th century, there were up to eight churches, several of which later disappeared, such as those of San Dictino and San Feliz. A similar fate befell some monasteries, with older ones such as San Martín and San Francisco vanishing. Meanwhile, various chapels funded by guilds were built, including San Esteban, San Adrián, San Felipe Neri, and San Pedro, along with numerous hospitals due to the growth of the Camino de Santiago. Additionally, from 1471, the construction of the new cathedral began.

=== The modern city ===
In the late 17th century, Manuel de la Lastra designed the layout of the Plaza Mayor and constructed the Town Hall, where the municipal council meetings, previously held in the atrium of the church of San Bartolomé as was customary in Leonese open councils, were henceforth conducted. By the 18th century, the city was organized into four parishes—San Bartolomé, San Miguel, San Julián, and Santa Marta—with the suburbs of San Andrés, Puerta de Rey, and Rectivía located outside the walls. Connections to other parts of the peninsula were limited to cart roads in varying states of repair, and several authors, such as Antonio Ponz and Alexandre de Laborde, lamented between 1787 and 1807 the poor condition, irregularity, and lack of cleanliness of the city's streets.

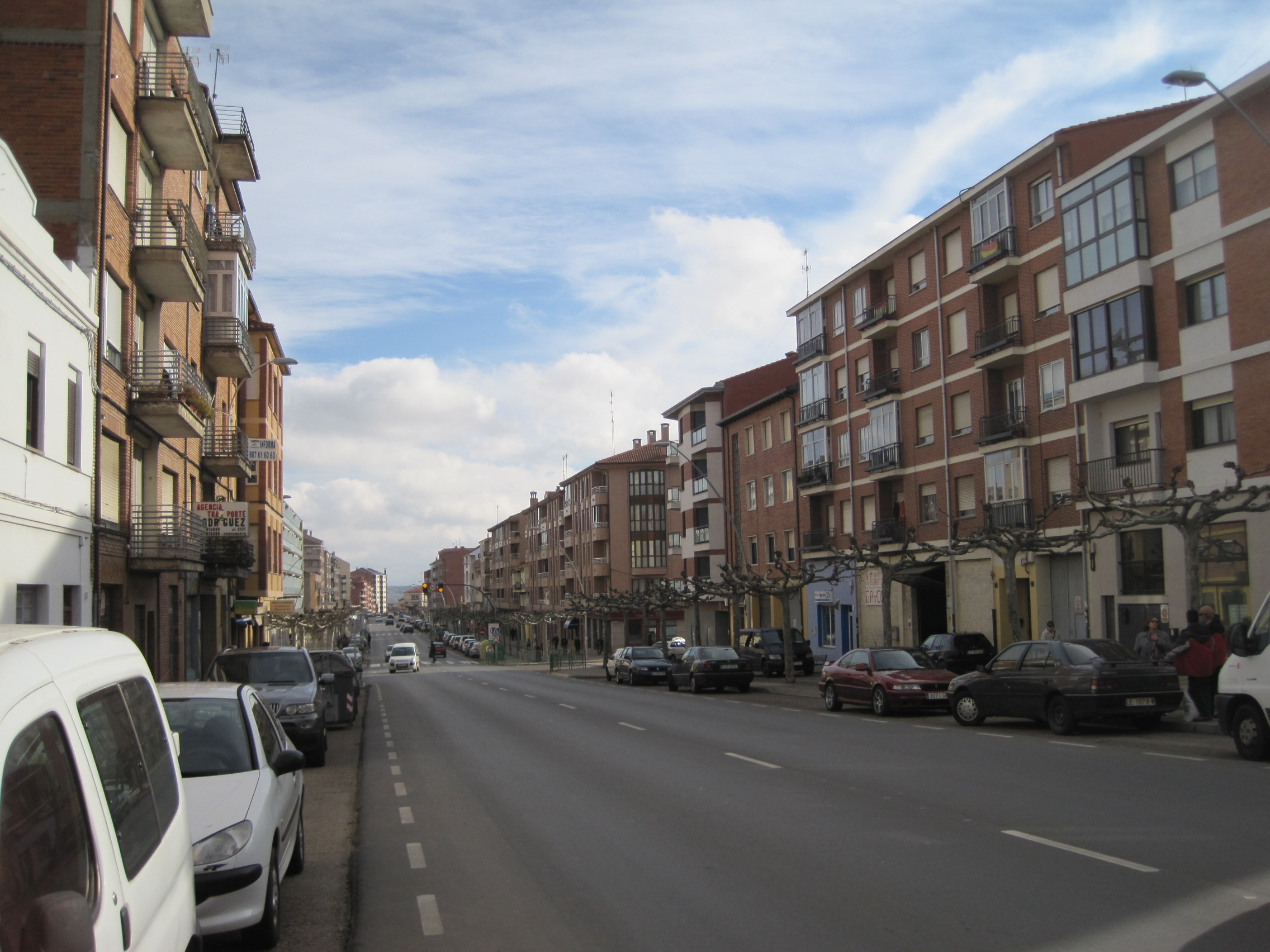
View of Ponferrada Avenue, one of the main thoroughfares in the contemporary city

=== The contemporary city ===
After the end of the War of Independence, which directly impacted Astorga, the city began its recovery through commercial and industrial activity, particularly with the development of the chocolate industry. In the final years of the century, the city, which had previously seen limited expansion, began to grow beyond the walled enclosure: on February 19, 1866, the railway arrived with the opening of the León-Astorga section of the León-La Coruña railway line, and on July 1, 1898, the Plasencia-Astorga railway line was inaugurated. This dual rail connection spurred growth in the San Andrés and Puerta de Rey neighborhoods, while the link between the Madrid-La Coruña highway and the León road benefited the rest of the city. This development was accompanied by the inauguration of the water supply system in 1889—replacing an earlier project from 1782–1787 called "Viaje de Aguas"—which eliminated the need to fetch water from the Fuente Encalada spring, and the installation of electric lighting in 1897.

In the 20th century, specifically in 1924, the Santocildes military barracks were inaugurated. During the second quarter of the century, the urban core expanded northward and westward, though the Civil War slowed this growth. Examples of expansion in subsequent decades include the areas of Santa Clara, Manjarín, Candelas, Cuatro Caminos, and the Pandorado road. In 1996, two green spaces, previously scarce in the urban core, were created with the transformation of La Eragudina into a garden and El Melgar into a recreational area.

Since 1985, a Comprehensive Plan for the Protection of Buildings declared Bien de Interés Cultural, another for the preservation of facades, and a third for the recovery of unique elements have been in place. These initiatives have led to the rehabilitation of spaces such as the Aljibe, Plaza de la Culebra, and Plaza Romana, as well as the pedestrianization of the so-called Monumental Axis, between Puerta Sol and Plaza Eduardo de Castro.

=== Parks and gardens ===
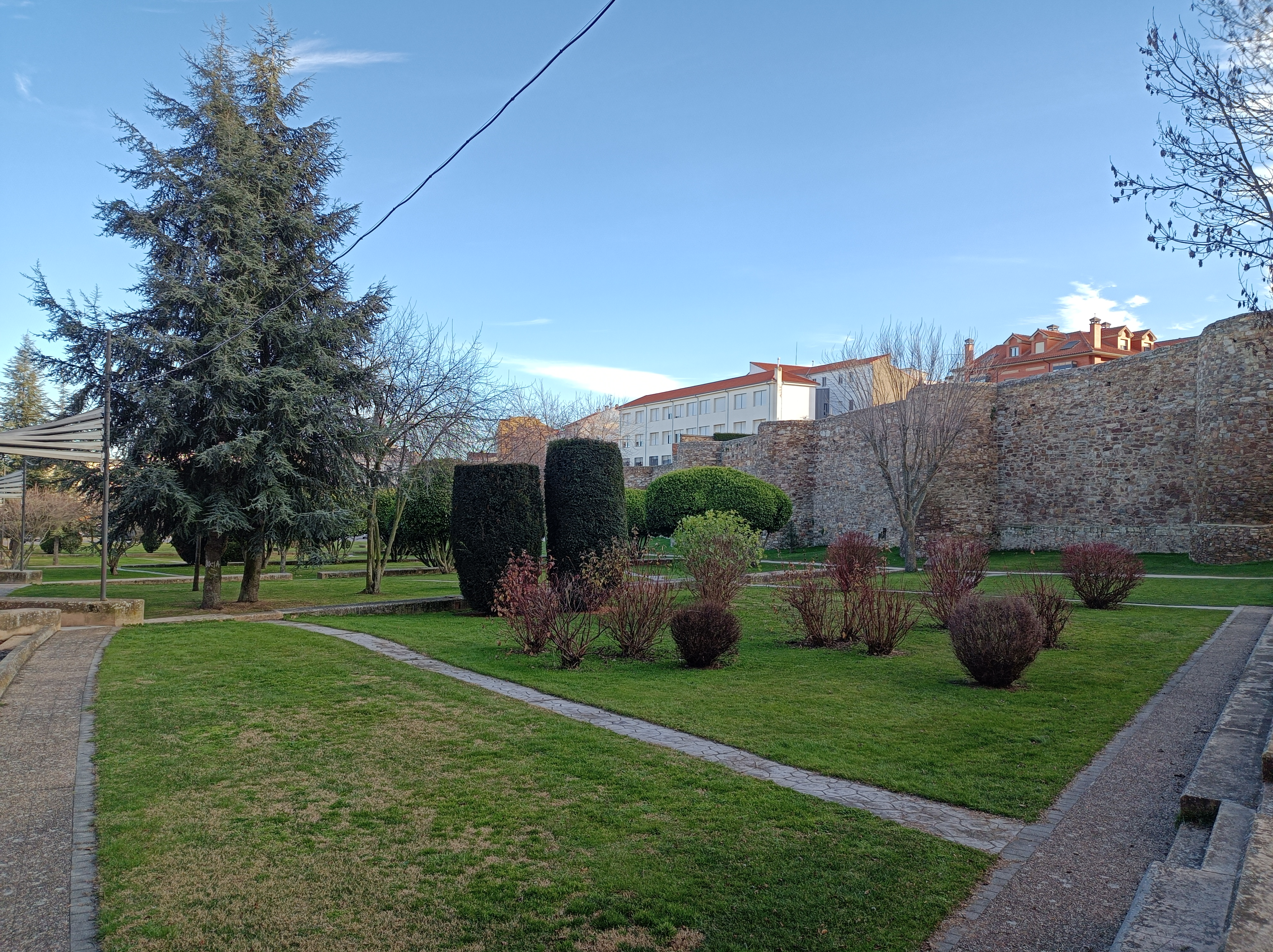
Melgar Park

The city features several green spaces, with the Synagogue Garden standing out for its historical significance. In the last decades of the 20th century, the parks of La Eragudina, El Melgar, and El Mayuelo were added.

The Synagogue Garden, previously known as San Francisco, Alfonso XIII, and Generalísimo, is the city's oldest park, established in 1835. The area it occupies was part of the Jewish quarter, where the synagogue was located, hence its name. Three years after the project's inception, the leveling of the significantly sloped terrain was completed. By early 1840, the works were finished, and the garden, one of Spain's first romantic-style gardens according to Roberto Alonso, featured a rockery fountain, hedges, and walkways, later complemented by a rose garden. From this garden begins what was once the chemin de ronde of the city wall, which over time became the city's main promenade.

The Mayuelo Park, located halfway between the urban core and the Sierro hill, occupies a meadow area with several springs, some of which were used for drinking water or laundry. In the mid-1970s, a fountain was built over one of the springs, playground equipment was installed, and trees were planted. In 1993, the Town Council developed a project for the park, which spans over 7,000 square meters. The project included a central tree-lined walkway, children's play areas, and recreational spaces. The fountain was also remodeled by the Workshop School.

The La Eragudina field, a former recreational area of the marquises of Astorga near the Jerga River, was transformed into a garden in 1996, featuring newly planted tree species such as willows, ashes, maples, and poplars, along with a fountain and recreational areas. In the same year, the area at the foot of the city wall, known as El Melgar, was also converted into a park, with the surroundings of the Roman Gate, behind the apse of the cathedral, being landscaped.

Other recreational areas in the city include the Aljibe Park, near the cathedral and named after a medieval water cistern, and the surroundings of Fuente Encalada. This fountain, built in 1674 and remodeled in 1788 in a neoclassical style, now features a landscaped setting.

== Economy ==
The city's economic structure is characterized by weak industrial activity, with a strong reliance on the tertiary sector, public administration, and, to a lesser extent, construction. Agriculture remains significant in the municipality's rural areas.

=== Business activity and employment ===
As of March 2013, the municipality had 596 establishments employing 2,280 workers. In 2007, of the total employed population in the municipality, 1.3% worked in the primary sector, 14.6% in industry, 14.6% in construction, and the majority, 69.5%, were employed in the service sector, highlighting its importance to the municipal economy. Unemployment in the 21st century rose from 176 people in May 2005 to 778 in March 2020, with 341 men and 437 women.

Vertical bar chart showing the evolution of the unemployment rate in Astorga between 2006 and 2019

=== Primary sector ===
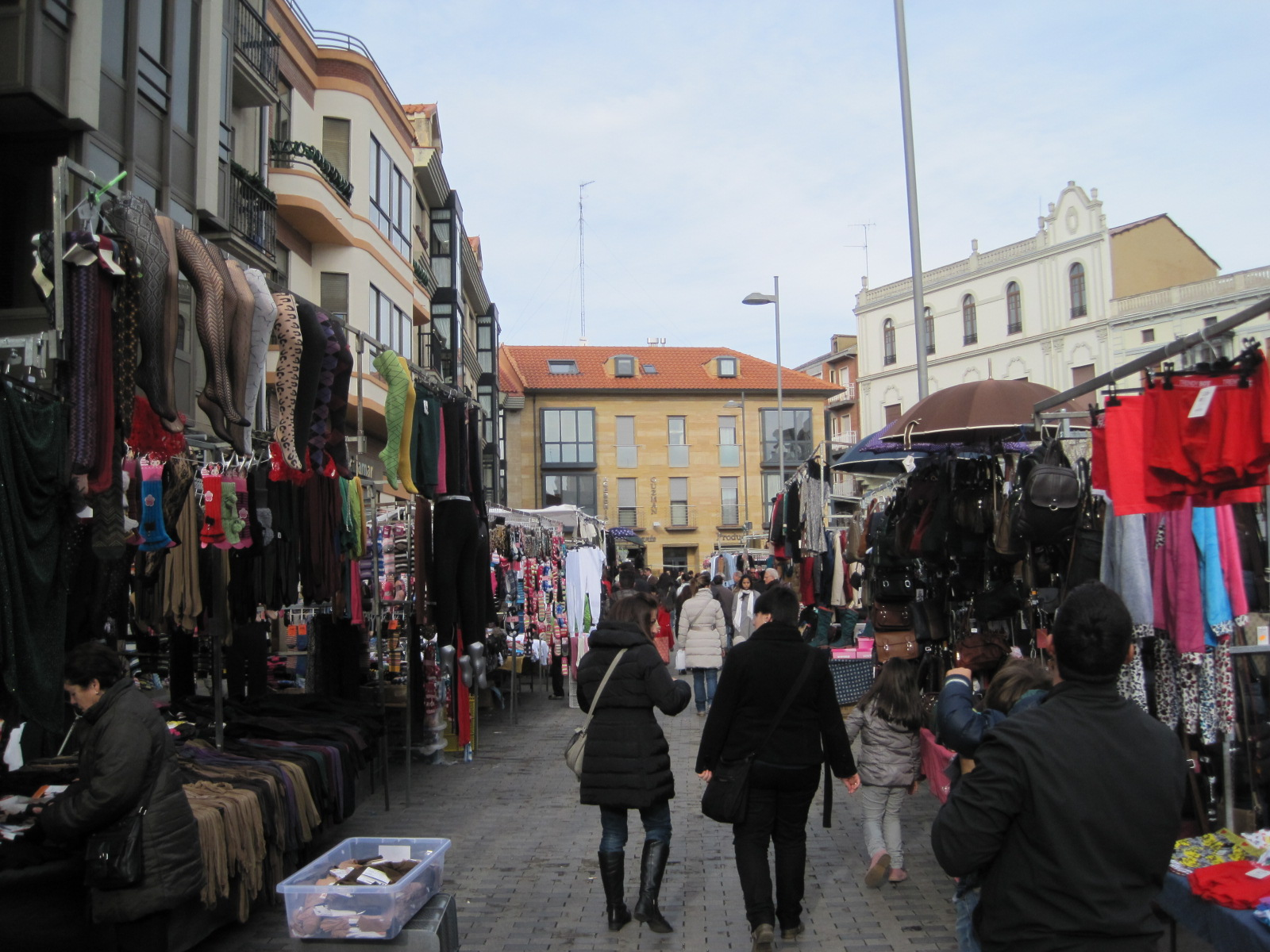
Partial view of the weekly market, where products from Astorga and surrounding regions are sold

In 2011, the municipality had an agricultural area of 1,045.8 hectares, of which 1,021.5 hectares were arable land, divided between dry farming and irrigated crops located east of the municipality along the Tuerto River. Another 15 hectares were used for vegetable gardens, and 8.3 hectares for fruit trees. The wine sector was a cornerstone of the city's economy, particularly between the 13th century and 15th century, but by the 17th century, wine had to be imported from Rueda or Toro due to the gradual disappearance of vineyard land, leaving only one hectare. The remaining land is distributed among pastures (2,339.6 hectares), forest species (557.9 hectares), and other non-agricultural spaces (706.2 hectares). Overall, the primary sector employed 1.3% of workers and accounted for 0.5% of businesses, reflecting the tertiarization of the municipal economy. Agricultural activity remains present in the various hamlets, while it is nearly nonexistent in the municipal seat.

=== Secondary sector ===
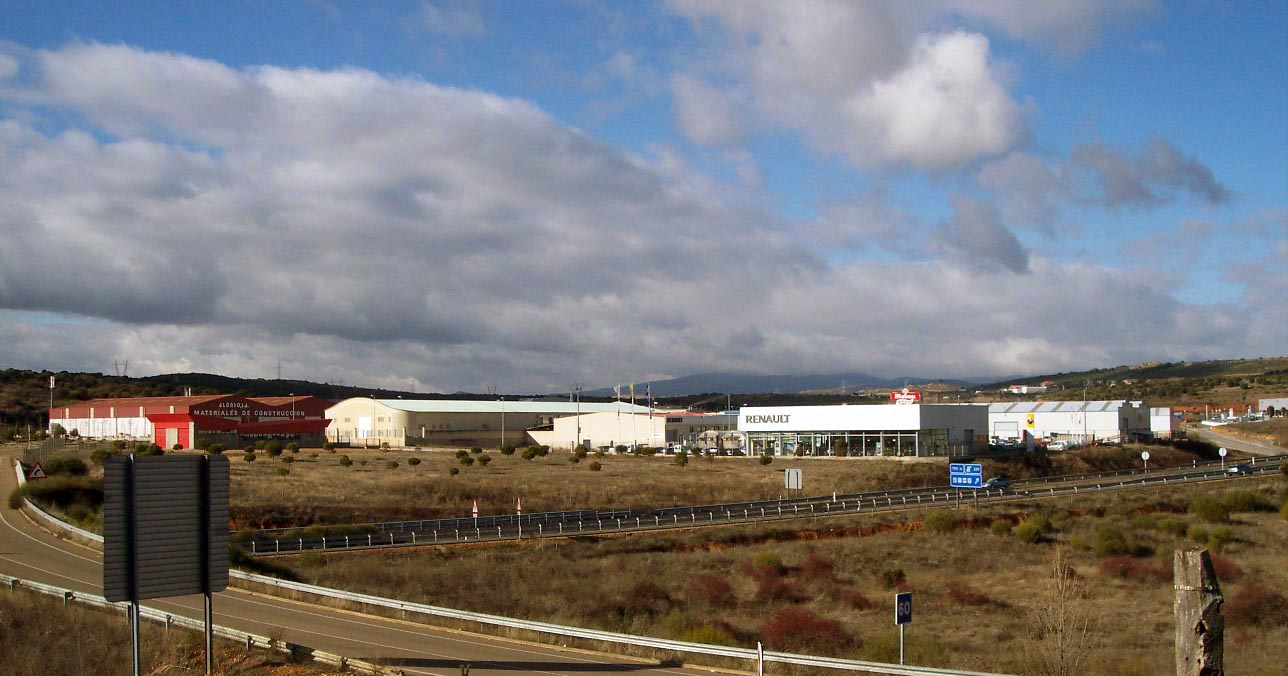
Partial view of the industrial estate next to the A-6

In 2007, industry was the second most significant economic activity, employing 29.2% of workers and accounting for 24.5% of businesses. Most industries are light and generate minimal pollution. The most prominent belong to the food industry, with companies such as Cecinas Pablo, Dulces La Mallorquina, and Alonso, focusing on traditional products such as puff pastries, mantecadas, and cecina; Astorga is the seat of the denomination of origin for the latter two. Although now minor, the chocolate industry was significant from the mid-19th century to the first third of the 20th century; in 1916, there were 41 manufacturers, four of which remain active. Their legacy, including wrappers, posters, lithographs, and old machinery, is preserved in the Chocolate Museum. The textile industry was also present, though only one factory survives, along with remnants such as a washhouse.

Most industrial activity is concentrated in the industrial estate, promoted by the Town Council and the Chamber of Commerce and Industry. Its development has occurred in four phases: the first (1991) with 65,000 m², the second with nearly 50,000 m², the third (2007) with 79,000 m², and the fourth (2011), still under development. In 2011, the city had 2 energy and water companies, 5 chemical companies, 24 metallurgical companies, and 66 manufacturing companies, totaling 97 industrial businesses. The construction sector recorded 100 businesses.

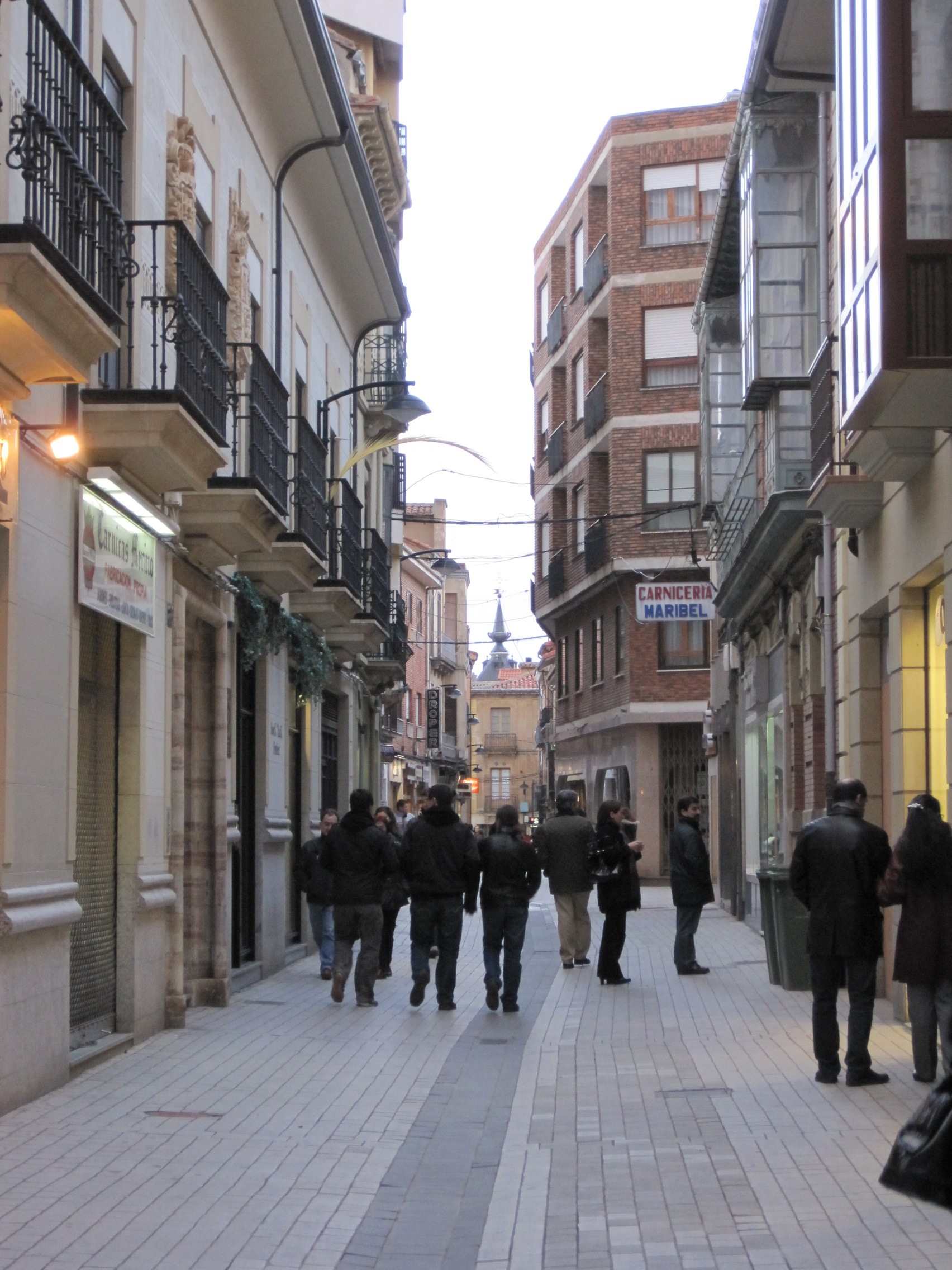
The pedestrianization of part of the historic center has fostered the development of small-scale commerce

=== Tertiary sector ===
In 2007, the service sector was prominent, employing 69.5% of workers and comprising 75% of businesses. The city serves as an economic hub for surrounding regions such as Maragatería and La Cepeda, resulting in intense commercial activity; in 2012, there were 60 wholesale businesses, and in 2011, 316 retail businesses, including 114 in food retail (16 supermarkets), 188 in non-food retail, and 14 in mixed retail. In 2012, there were 14 deposit institutions, including five banks and six savings banks.

Cultural tourism plays a significant role in the service sector due to the city's historical and monumental heritage, its festivals, and its position on the Camino de Santiago and the Vía de la Plata. Nearby, notable villages such as Castrillo de los Polvazares and Santiago Millas, and iconic Camino de Santiago sites such as Foncebadón, stand out. In March 2013, the municipality had 47 tourism establishments, including three travel agencies, nine rural tourism accommodations (115 beds), 16 hotels (549 beds), and 47 restaurants. In 2011, there were 115 cafés and bars. Since 2004, the city has had a parking area for motorhomes.

== Symbols and titles ==
The municipal coat of arms is described as follows:

Gules, an oak branch in its natural color. At the crest, a marquess's coronet.

The date of its initial use is unknown. A 1320 document features a seal of the Astorga Council depicting a castle with three towers and a tree. By 1635, the current shield was in use, as seen in Pedro Junco's work Fundación, nombres y armas de la ciudad de Astorga. Junco interpreted that the city's ancient name—Roma—led to the term robur, hence the depiction of an oak, with Quercus robur being one of the most common species, symbolizing strength, firmness, and fortitude, akin to the attributes of solidity and longevity in classical mythology. The red field mirrors that of Rome, symbolizing the blood of enemies attempting to conquer the city. The flag, rectangular, is described as follows:

Red flag with the shield in the center.

Regarding its titles, the city is known as "Very Noble, Loyal, Meritorious, Magnificent, and Augustan." The first three were granted for its role during the War of Independence; centuries earlier, it had been called "Augustan" by Emperor Caesar Augustus and "Magnificent" by Pliny the Elder.

== Administration and politics ==
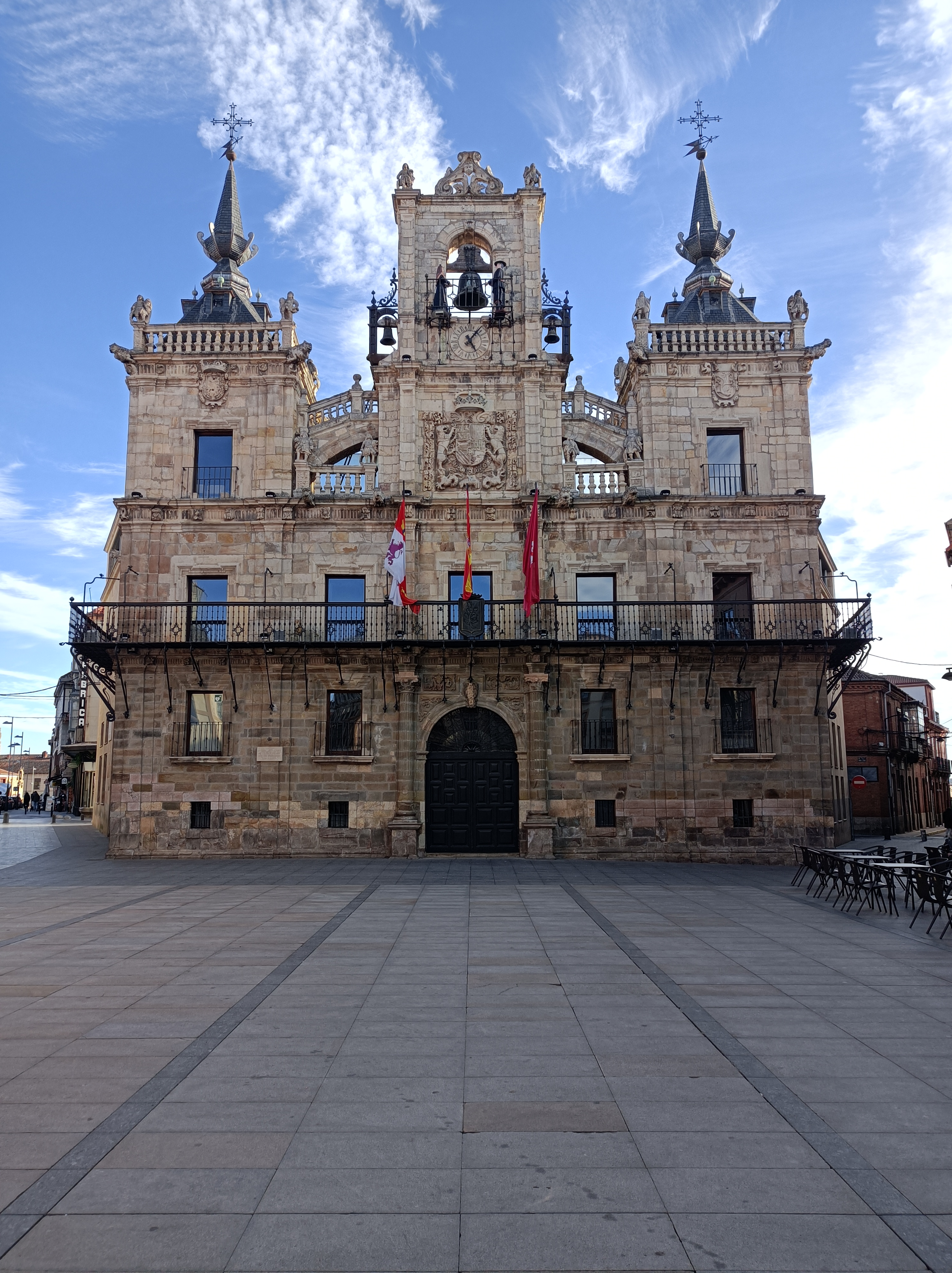
The town hall in Plaza Mayor

=== Public administration ===
Regional administration

The Regional Government of Castile and León holds responsibilities for education, managed by the Department of Education, which oversees teachers and educational centers, and healthcare, through Sacyl, which manages the municipality's healthcare services.

Local administration

Local administration is handled by a democratically managed town council, whose members are elected every four years by universal suffrage. The electoral roll includes all residents registered in Astorga over 18 years old, who are nationals of Spain or other member states of the European Union. According to the General Electoral Law, which determines the number of eligible councilors based on the municipality's population, the municipal corporation consists of 17 councilors.

Judicial administration

Astorga is the head of the judicial district of the same name, the fifth in the province, with two courts of first instance. The city also has a notary office.

=== Municipal government ===
In the first democratic elections of 1979, the Union of the Democratic Centre (UCD) came to power under Luis González Pérez, followed in the next term by Recaredo Bautista of the Agrupación Electoral Popular Independiente (AEPI). In the 1987 elections, Juan José Alonso Perandones (PSOE) fell just short of an absolute majority, but the four opposition groups united to give the mayoralty to the minority candidacy of Adolfo Alonso Ares. However, two years later, with the support of the Democratic and Social Centre (CDS) representative Rosa Fernández González, a motion of censure enabled Perandones to become mayor on March 29, 1989, a position he held until 2011, when he announced his retirement from politics.

In the 2011 elections, with no coalition agreements reached among the political groups, the mayoralty went to the most-voted list, led by Victorina Alonso Fernández, Perandones' successor in the PSOE. In 2015, Arsenio García of the PP was elected mayor in a minority government. On July 5, 2019, following a judicial dispute in which the PP contested the validity of a vote initially deemed null, which the High Court of Justice of Castile and León confirmed as invalid, the PSOE and IU municipal groups formed a coalition government, returning the mayoral staff to Perandones after an eight-year absence from frontline politics.

Municipal elections in Astorga between 1979 and 1999
Political party	1979		1983		1987		1991		1995		1999	
Political party	% votes	councilors	% votes	councilors	% votes	councilors	% votes	councilors	% votes	councilors	% votes	councilors
PSOE	13.8	2	30.94	6	40.67	8	58.65	11	49.63	10	48.1	9
PP (CD, CP, and AP until 1989)	15.96	3	35.34	6	28.64	5	32.63	6	38.14	7	40.22	7
UPL	-	-	-	-	-	-	-	-	3.6	0	8.46	1
IU	-	-	-	-	-	-	1.94	0	2.43	0	1.3	0
UCD	33.89	7	-	-	-	-	-	-	-	-	-	-
Others	36.34	5	33.72	5	29.17	4	6.3	0	4.58	0	0.18	0

Municipal elections in Astorga since 2003
Political party	2003		2007		2011		2015		2019		2023	
Political party	% votes	councilors	% votes	councilors	% votes	councilors	% votes	councilors	% votes	councilors	% votes	councilors
PP	37.19	7	31.14	6	35.59	7	40.68	8	38.66	7	56.52	11
PSOE	46.79	8	45.11	8	35.68	7	18.45	3	33.85	7	29.09	5
IU	-	-	-	-	3.51	0	16.1	3	11.91	2	7.39	1
Vox	-	-	-	-	-	-	-	-	2.46	0	5.01	0
UPL	13.53	2	9.61	1	3.16	0	1.68	0	7.11	1	-	-
CS	-	-	-	-	-	-	2.39	0	4.45	0	-	-
PAL-UL	-	-	10.43	2	18.57	3	17.19	3	-	-	-	-
Others	0.26	0	-	-	0.19	0	1.72	0	0.22	0	-	-

Mayoralty

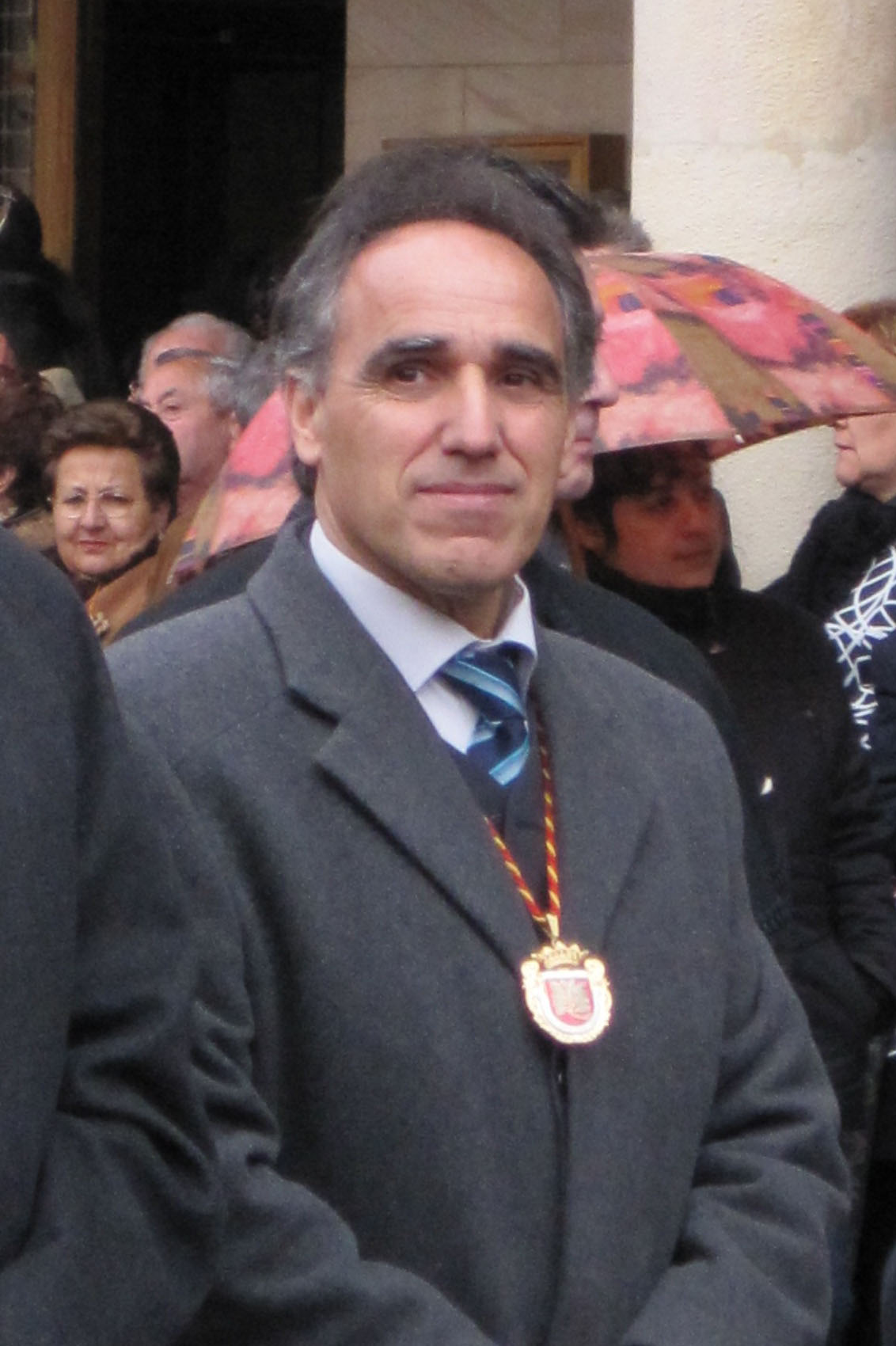
Juan José Alonso Perandones, mayor of Astorga 1989–2011 and 2019–2023

List of mayors since the 1979 municipal elections
Period	Name of the mayor	Political party
1979-1983	Luis González Pérez	UCD
1983-1987	Recaredo Bautista	AEPI
1987-1989	Adolfo Alonso Ares	PDP
1989-2011	Juan José Alonso Perandones	PSOE
2011-2015	Victorina Alonso Fernández	PSOE
2015-2019	Arsenio García Fuertes	PP / Non-affiliated (Note: In September 2018, he was expelled from the PP after being investigated in the Enredadera operation.)
2019-2023	Juan José Alonso Perandones	PSOE
2023-	José Luis Nieto	PP

Government departments

The municipal executive is organized into various departments, each led by a councilor from the governing body. The management departments of the Town Council during the 2019-2023 term are as follows:

- Department of Works, Urban Planning, and Police
- Department of Commerce, Market, and Cemetery
- Department of Health and Social Development
- Department of Culture, Music, and Personnel
- Department of Tourism and Technological Development
- Department of Equality, Communication, and Kennel
- Department of Sports, Festivals, and Youth
- Department of Finance, Economic Development, and Industry
- Department of Environment and Hamlets

== Services ==
=== Communications ===
==== Vehicle fleet ====
In 2011, the municipality had a vehicle fleet of 465.3 cars per 1,000 inhabitants. According to data from the "Economic Yearbook of Spain 2012" published by La Caixa, there were 5,491 cars in total. The same data indicates a fleet of 1,250 trucks and vans, with other vehicles totaling 1,150, bringing the total number of motor vehicles to 7,926. The city has a Vehicle Inspection Station located in the industrial estate.

==== Road network ====
Identifier	Name	Route
A-6	Northwest Motorway	Runs between Madrid and La Coruña.
AP-71	León-Astorga Motorway	Connects the provincial capital with Astorga, primarily with toll sections and some free sections.
N-6	La Coruña Road	Runs between Madrid and La Coruña.
N-120	National Road	A major road axis in northern Spain, connecting Logroño and Vigo.
LE-451	Provincial Road	Connects with La Cepeda.
LE-141	Provincial Road	Connects with the interior of Maragatería.
LE-133	Provincial Road	Connects with Nogarejas and Zamora.
LE-142	Provincial Road	Connects with Ponferrada via the Foncebadón Pass.

==== Public transportation ====
Bus

For passenger transport, the company ALSA provides road services between the city and multiple national destinations, such as León, Ponferrada, La Coruña, Valladolid, Madrid, Gijón, or Barcelona. Locally, several companies offer services between Astorga and surrounding regional localities.

Railway

Since the railway arrived in 1866, the city has had a railway station, located in the Puerta del Rey neighborhood, northeast of the city. Managed by Adif, the station is part of the Palencia-La Coruña line. Astorga's railway connections, operated by Renfe, include:

- Astorga-Ponferrada (Alvia)
- Astorga-La Coruña (Alvia, Arco, Trenhotel)
- Astorga-Vigo (Alvia, Arco, Trenhotel)
- Astorga-Ferrol (Trenhotel)
- Astorga-Madrid (Alvia, Trenhotel)
- Astorga-Barcelona (Alvia, Trenhotel)
- Astorga-Bilbao (Arco)
- Astorga-Irún (Arco)
- Astorga-León (Intercity, Regional Express)

Until 1983, Astorga was also the starting point of the Vía de la Plata railway, inaugurated on July 21, 1896, connecting Astorga to Plasencia. For several years, various organizations and companies have demanded its reopening to effectively connect the western peninsula and restore freight transport by rail.

Air transport

The León Airport, operational since 1999, is the only airport in the province and the closest to the municipality, located between Valverde de la Virgen and San Andrés del Rabanedo, 44 kilometers from Astorga. Other nearby options for air transport are the Valladolid and Asturias airports, located 157 and 193 kilometers away, respectively.

=== Education ===
The city's educational infrastructure includes three early childhood and primary education centers, one secondary education institute, and one special education center in the public sector, as well as three private centers offering education from early childhood to secondary school.

The secondary institute offers Compulsory Secondary Education, Baccalaureate, and vocational training programs such as Electricity and Electronics and Cooking and Catering at the basic level, Bakery, Pastry and Confectionery, Administrative Management, Telecommunications Installations, Electrical and Automatic Installations at the intermediate level, and Administration and Finance and Industrial Automation and Robotics at the advanced level.

For specialized education, Astorga has an Official Language School offering French, English, and German, a professional music conservatory, a municipal music school, and an adult education center.

Educational centers in Astorga
Center	Type	Education	Center	Type	Education
CEIP Ángel González Álvarez	Public	Early Childhood and Primary Education	CPM Ángel Barja	Public	Music
CEIP Blanco de Cela	Public	Early Childhood and Primary Education	EOI Astorga	Public	Languages
CEIP Santa Marta	Public	Early Childhood and Primary Education	University of Experience	Public	Adult
IES Asturica Augusta	Public	Secondary Education	La Salle (Brothers of the Christian Schools)	Private	Early Childhood, Primary, and Secondary Education
CPEE Santa M.ª Madre de la Iglesia	Public	Special Education	Paula Montal (Piarists)	Private	Early Childhood, Primary, and Secondary Education
CEPA Lyda	Public	Adult Education	Virgen de las Candelas (Stigmatine Sisters)	Private	Early Childhood Education

=== Healthcare ===
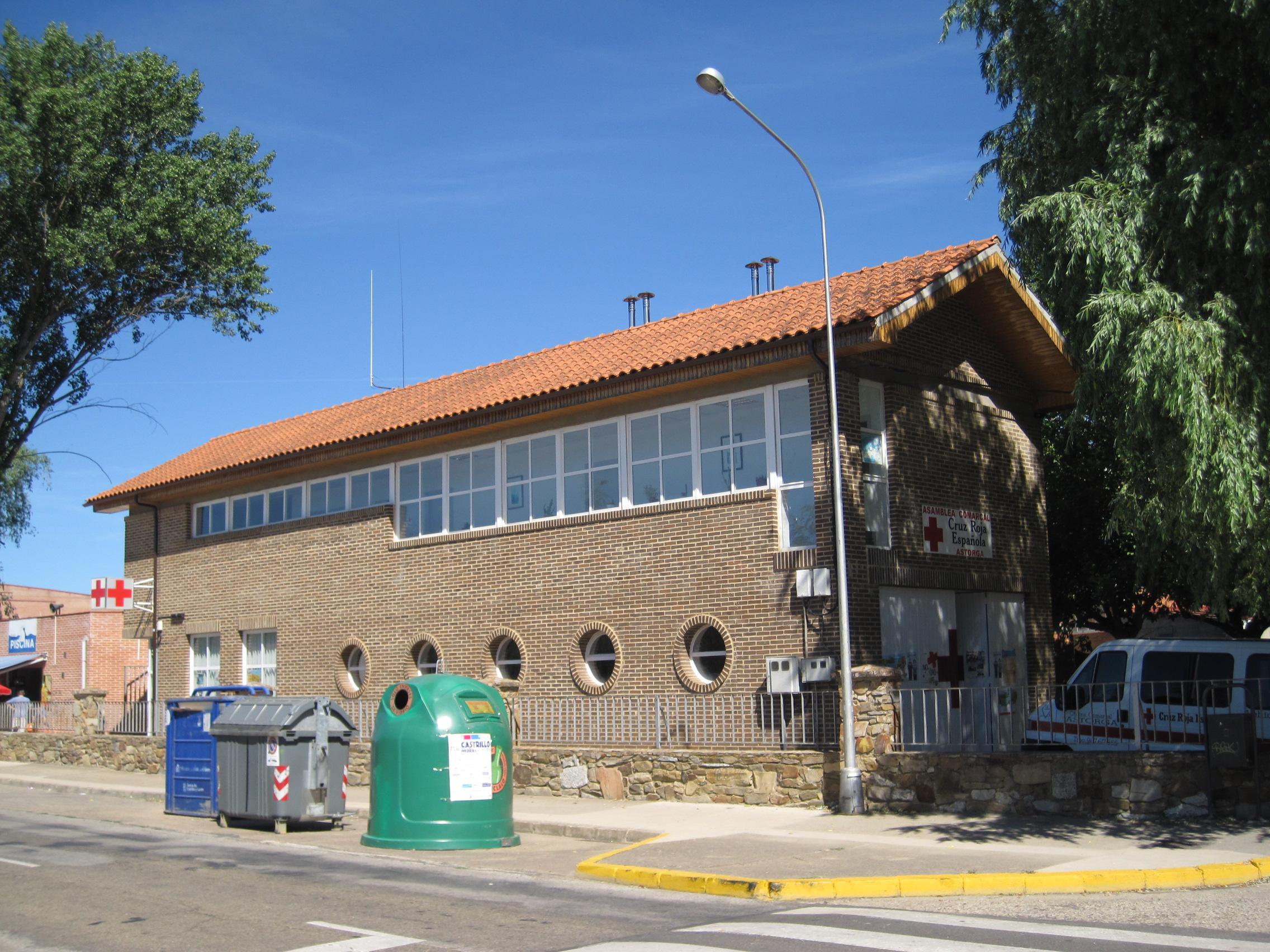
Local assembly of the Spanish Red Cross

The city's healthcare system is divided between public health services and private medicine. For the former, Astorga has a health center that serves as the hub for the basic health zones of Astorga I—covering the municipalities of San Justo de la Vega and Villaobispo de Otero, in addition to Astorga itself—and Astorga II, which includes Brazuelo, Val de San Lorenzo, Valderrey, Quintana del Castillo, Santa Colomba de Somoza, Magaz de Cepeda, Luyego, Lucillo, Villamejil, Villagatón, and Santiago Millas. It also has a heliport for the 112 emergency service.

The Town Council manages the responsibilities outlined in Article 42 of the General Healthcare Law, which stipulates that municipalities, without prejudice to other public administrations, have the following minimum responsibilities in health-related matters:

- Environmental health control: air pollution, water supply, wastewater sanitation, urban and industrial waste.
- Health control of industries, activities, and services, transportation, noise, and vibrations.
- Health control of buildings and places of residence and human coexistence, particularly food centers, hairdressers, saunas, personal hygiene centers, hotels, residential centers, schools, tourist camps, and sports and recreational activity areas.
- Health control of the distribution and supply of perishable foods, beverages, and other products directly or indirectly related to human use or consumption, as well as their transport means.
- Health control of cemeteries and mortuary health policing.

The city also has a Spanish Red Cross post and seven pharmacies.

=== Public safety ===
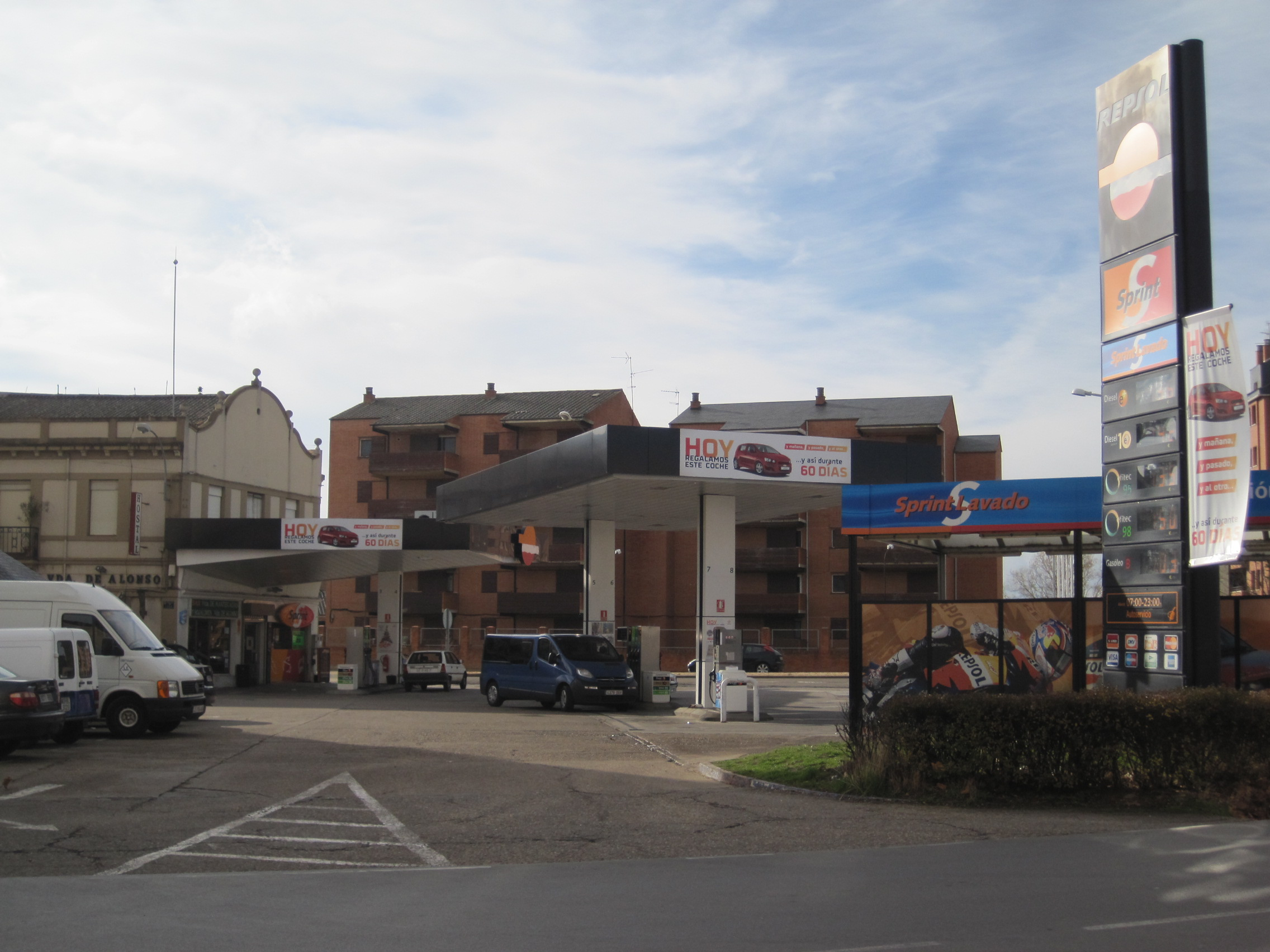
Service station at the intersection of Ponferrada Avenue and the Madrid-La Coruña road

Astorga has units of the Civil Guard, local police, and National Police ensuring public safety. As in the rest of Castile and León, the 112 emergency service system is operational. Additionally, the Santocildes Barracks is home to the Command of the El Teleno Maneuver and Firing Range and the 63rd Field Rocket Artillery Regiment, under the Ministry of Defence.

=== Social services ===
The city has several private care facilities, including the San Juan Bautista Residence, San Francisco de Asís Residence, El Chapin Home Residence, and Virgen de los Desamparados Residence, and the Las Cinco Llagas social center, dedicated to physically disabled individuals and managed by Caritas Internationalis. Since 1986, the Pensioners' Home has served as a place for elderly people to socialize and engage in activities.

=== Supply and cleaning ===
Fuel

The supply of petroleum-derived fuels (gasoline and diesel) is sourced from the storage facilities of Exolum in Vega de Infanzones, near León, and distributed to vehicles through two service stations, one operated by Repsol YPF and another by Cepsa.

Water service

Water is sourced from the Tuerto River—stored in the Villameca Reservoir—at the La Forti site, from where it is pumped to the treatment plant at El Sierro. Once treated, the water is stored in reservoirs for distribution to the city. Since 2008, Astorga has had a wastewater treatment plant receiving water from the sewer system.

Waste and cleaning

Urban waste management is handled by the municipal company Ecoastúrica, which performs tasks such as garbage collection, street cleaning, and managing the recycling center. The recycling center is located next to the municipal cemetery in the Puerta de Rey neighborhood. The municipality once had a landfill, but under the Castile and León Urban Waste Plan, it was sealed, and the degraded area was restored. In the nearby town of San Román de la Vega, there is a Waste Treatment Center (CTR) with a packaging sorting plant and a recycling and composting plant for municipal solid waste.

Food supply

For perishable food supplies such as fruits, vegetables, meat, and fish, the city has several supermarkets and traditional small food shops. Additionally, every Tuesday, a weekly market is held, occupying several streets in the city center, offering clothing, footwear, jewelry, salted food, fruits, and vegetables.

== Culture ==
=== Historical-artistic heritage ===
Historic site of Astorga
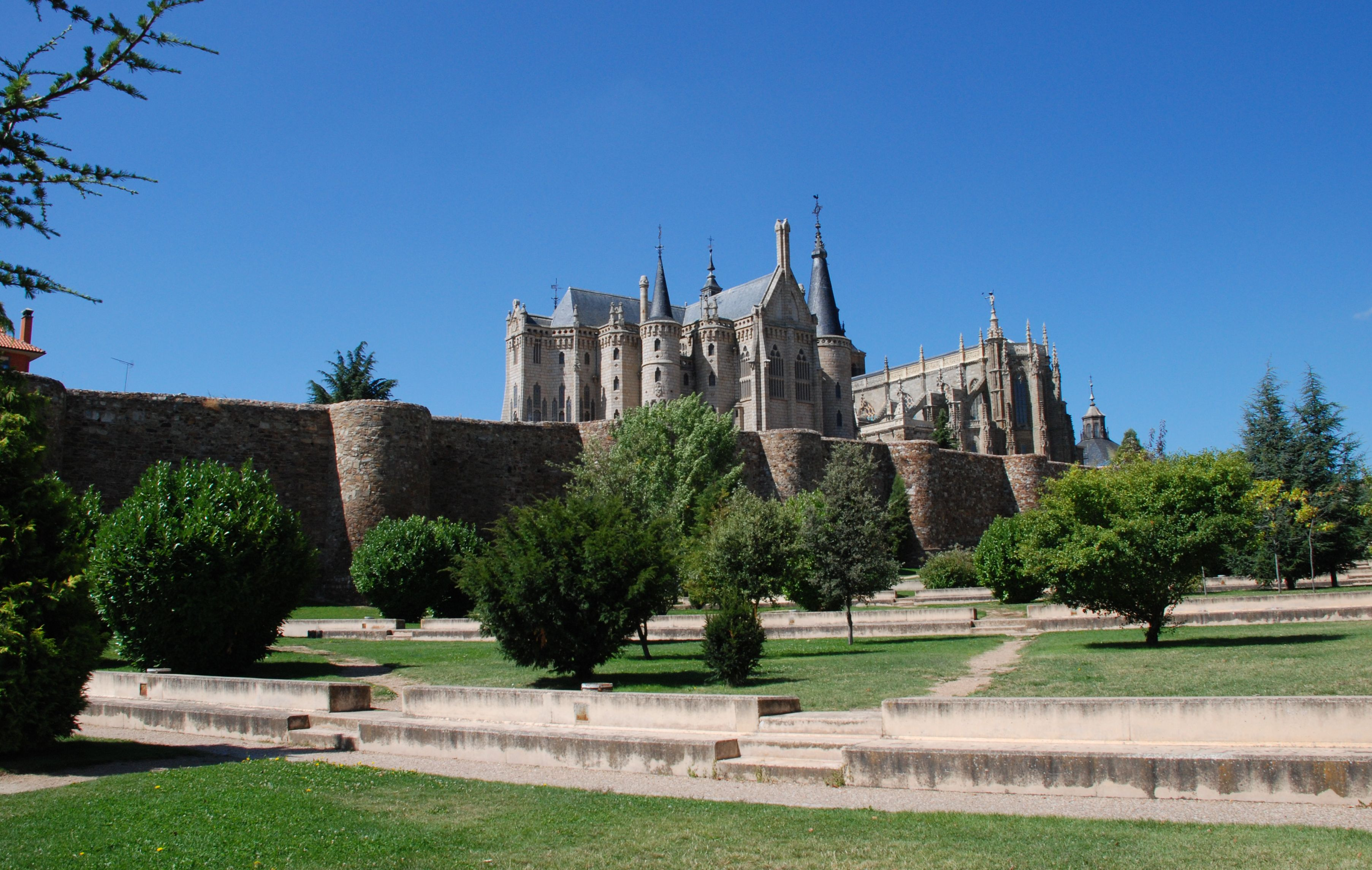
- Interactive map of Historic site of Astorga
- Location: Astorga, Spain

Spanish Cultural Heritage
- Designated: 21 January 1978
- Reference no.: RI-53-0000213

Astorga's architecture reflects the legacy of its inhabitants over centuries, boasting significant monumental wealth in both religious and civil buildings, spanning Roman, Romanesque, Gothic, Renaissance, Baroque, and Modernist styles. The municipality has seven Bien de Interés Cultural designations: the Historic Site of Astorga itself and that of Castrillo de los Polvazares, and, in the Monument category, the Surroundings of the Episcopal Palace, the Santa María Cathedral—designated a National Monument since 1931—the Roman Ergastula, the Episcopal Palace, and the Town Hall.

==== Roman Route ====
The first excavations took place in 1835, but it was not until the 1940s, under José María Luengo, that they gained prominence. Work continued from the late 20th century, leading to a route showcasing various preserved Roman remains beneath the city. The most notable findings relate to public spaces, including two bath complexes—the Major and Minor Baths—and the sewer system, still in use. In the forum, the Aedes Augusti, a temple dedicated to the imperial cult, and the Roman Ergastula, a cryptoporticus gallery housing the Roman Museum, are preserved. In the private sphere, the Domus of the Bear and Birds Mosaic, a residence following the traditional Roman domus layout, is one of the city's most characteristic Roman structures.

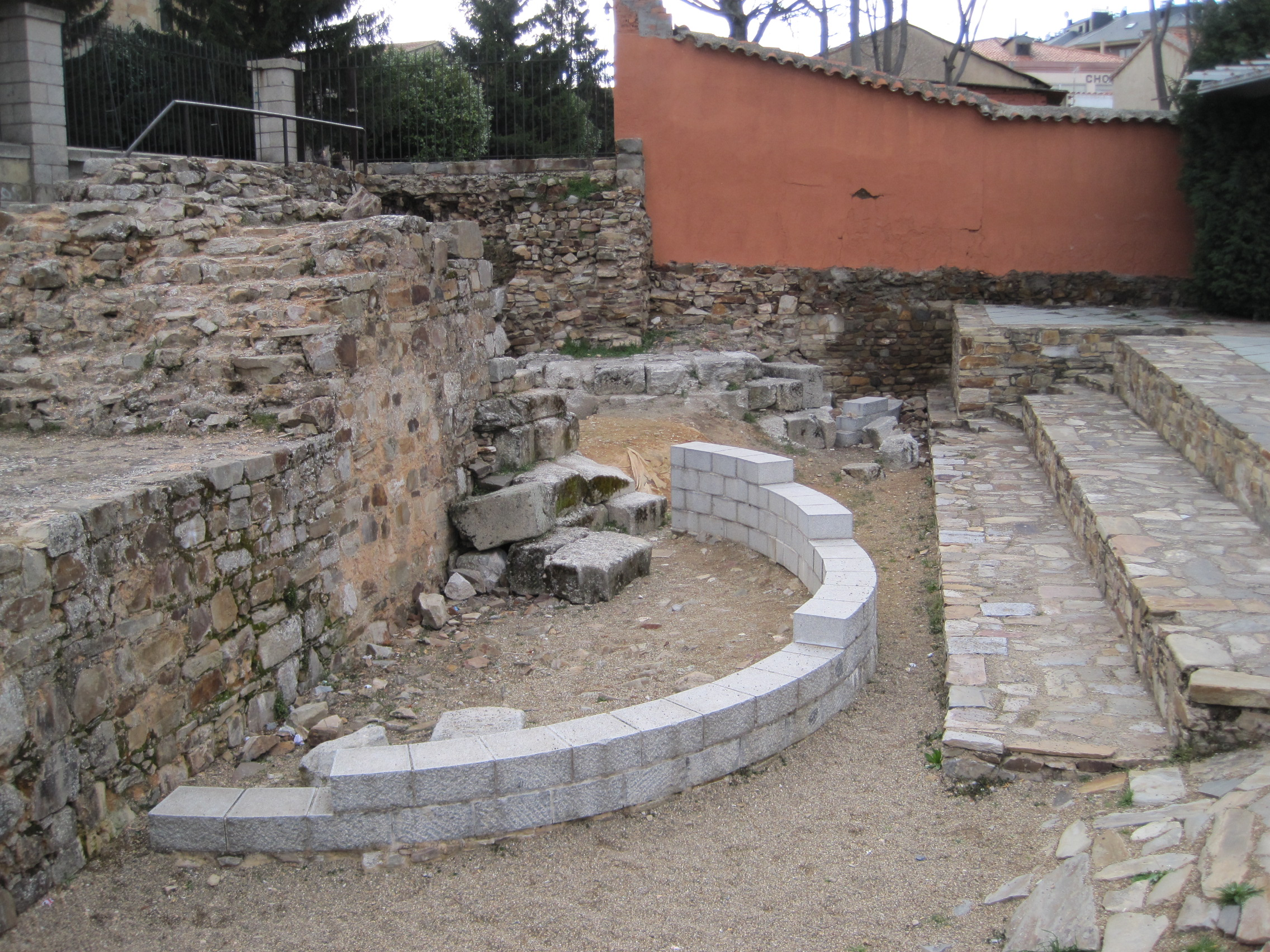
Remains of the only known Roman gate to date

Also part of the Roman legacy is the city wall. The initial defense of the Roman settlement was the vallum of the camp where the Legio X Gemina was based, dating to before the turn of the era. It consisted of two V-shaped trenches accompanied by an embankment and a wooden palisade. Later, in the 1st century, a first walled enclosure with circular towers was built, and in the 3rd century, a new wall fully encircled the hill on which the old town sits. This wall, slightly over two kilometers long and nearly rectangular, featured 27 semicircular towers spaced approximately 16 meters apart and was reused in the medieval period. The War of Independence caused significant damage to the wall during the 19th century, and the northern and southern sections, along with many western towers, were almost entirely demolished. No traces of the ancient gates remain, though their names persist in street nomenclature: Puerta Obispo, Puerta del Rey, El Postigo, Puerta del Sol, and Puerta de San Miguel.

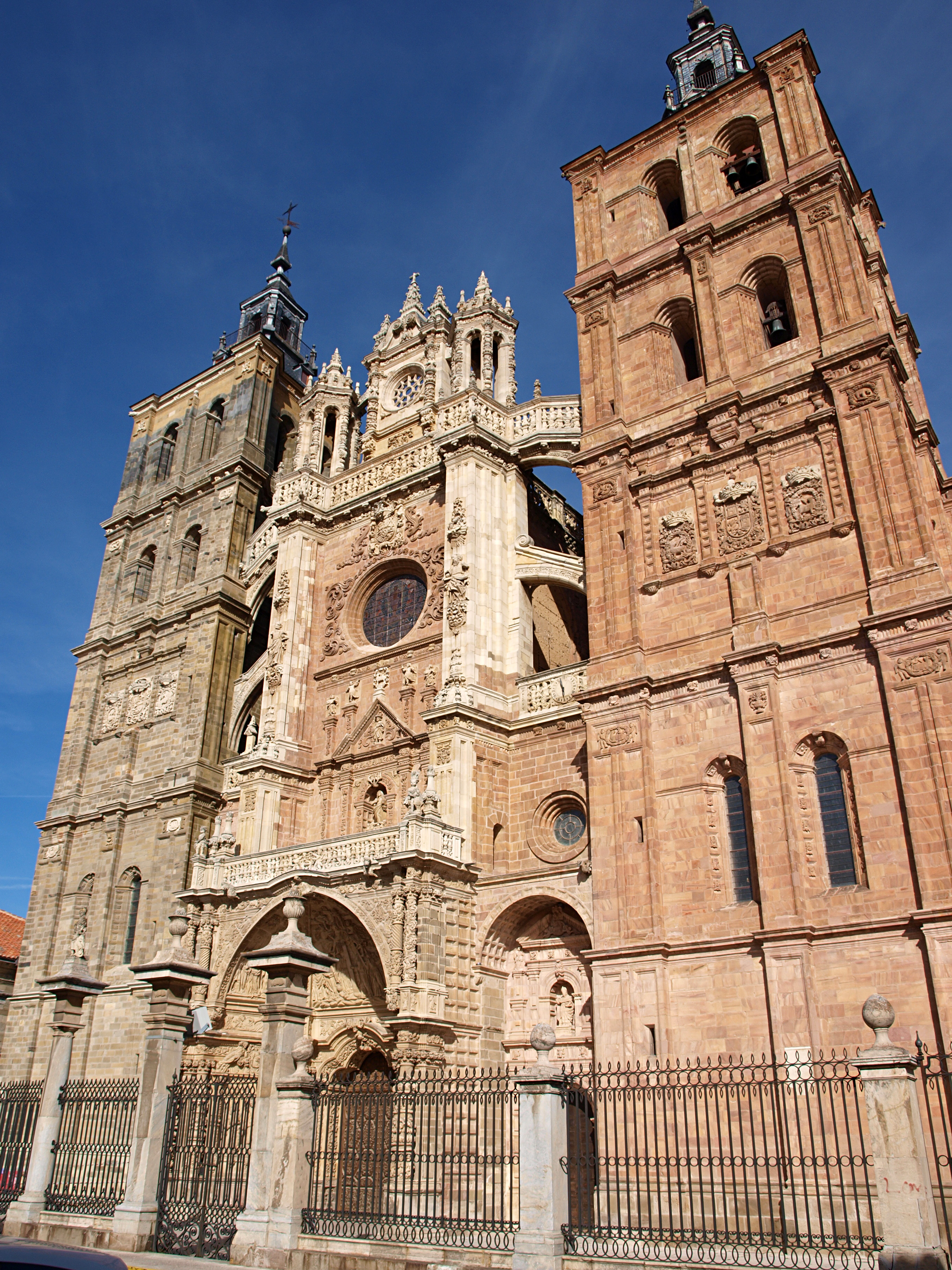
Cathedral facade

==== Cathedral ====
The origin of the cathedral, dedicated to Saint Mary, dates to 1069, when a first temple was consecrated by Bishop Pedro Núñez. It was rebuilt in 1087 under Bishop Osmundo and in the 13th century under Bishop Pedro Fernández. This last reconstruction served as the basis for the definitive expansion, which began in 1471. The works continued until the 18th century, resulting in a blend of Gothic, Renaissance, and Baroque elements. The cathedral has a rectangular plan, a three-apse chancel, three naves, and a false crossing; two towers flank the main facade. The initial Gothic section was built in the late 15th century and early 16th century. During the latter, the works were directed by Francisco de Colonia, Juan Gil de Hontañón, and Rodrigo Gil de Hontañón, who introduced Renaissance elements, particularly in the transept and southeast door. In the late 17th century, the main facade was begun: the ensemble, in Churrigueresque Baroque style, features three arched doorways flanked by two towers and is organized like a stone altarpiece with abundant decoration. The left tower, started in 1678, was affected by the 1755 Lisbon earthquake and the War of Independence, not being completed until 1965; the right tower, begun in 1692, was finished in 1704. On the exterior, atop one of the turrets crowning the chancel, stands the statue of Pedro Mato, a legendary figure linked to the Battle of Clavijo.

Inside, in addition to the 16th century choir with its seating and 17th century grille, various chapels are distributed: seven along the sides of the three naves, three in the chancel, one in each arm of the false crossing, and two at the base of each tower. Notable among them are the Chapel of Our Lady of Majesty, housing the 12th century Virgin of Majesty altarpiece; the Main Chapel, with a Renaissance-style altarpiece by Gaspar Becerra; and the Chapel of the San Miguel altarpiece, an example of 16th century Hispano-Flemish art. The cathedral complex also includes the crypt, built in 1521 beneath the presbytery as a pantheon for the marquises of Astorga; the neoclassical cloister from 1755, with five arches per wing joined by Ionic pilasters; the sacristy from 1772, featuring a Rococo altar-reliquary; and the facilities of the Diocesan Museum and Diocesan Archive.

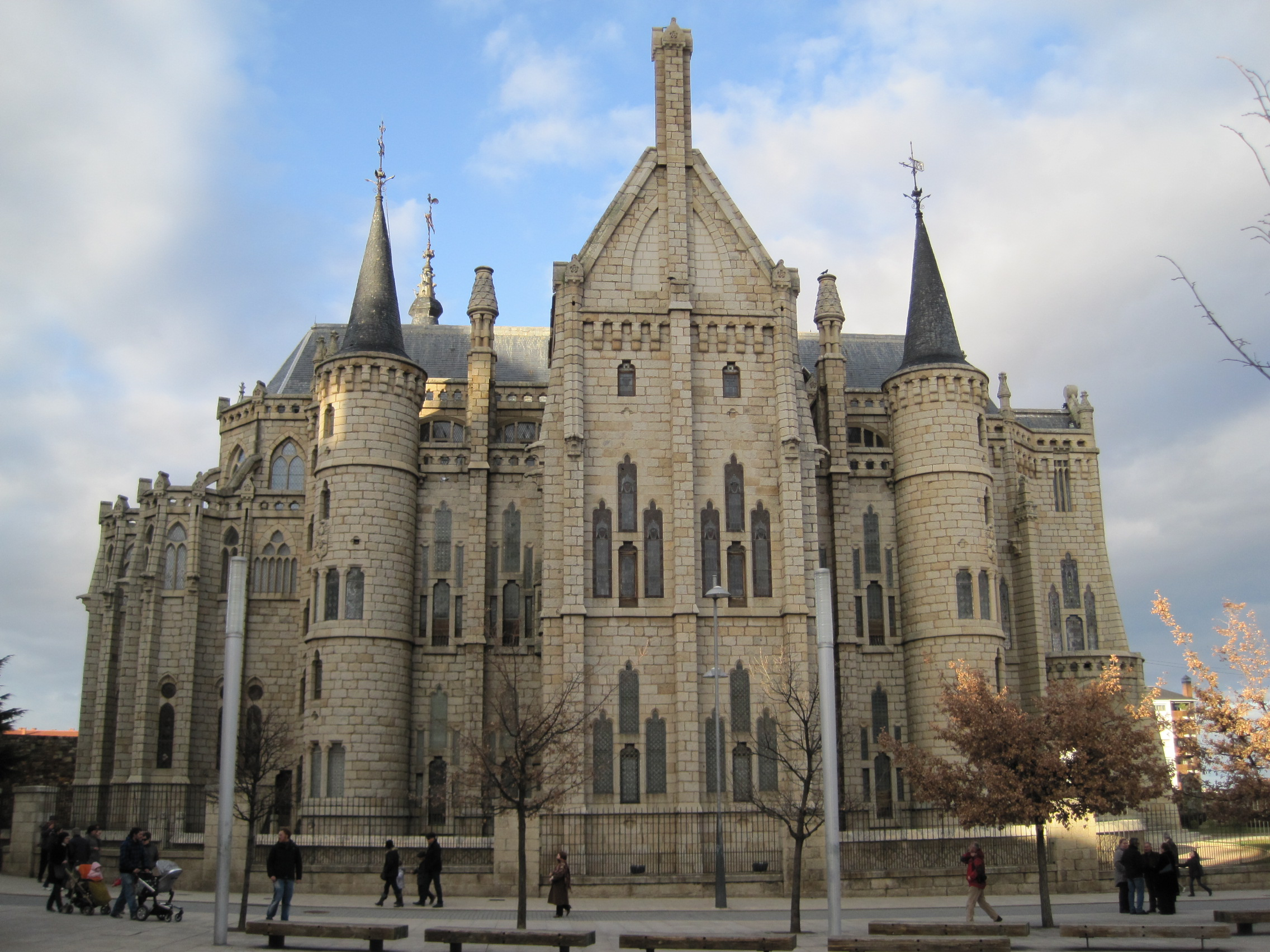
Side view of the palace

==== Episcopal Palace ====
External videos
- Palacio Episcopal de Astorga.

After the 1886 fire that destroyed the previous episcopal palace, Bishop Joan Baptista Grau i Vallespinós commissioned a new palace from the modernist architect Antoni Gaudí, with whom he had a longstanding friendship. Construction began in 1889, but after the bishop's death in 1893, Gaudí resigned from the project due to disagreements with the Chapter, when the second floor and attic were still incomplete. Architects Francisco Blanch y Pons and Manuel Hernández Álvarez-Reyero took over without success, until Bishop Julián de Diego y Alcolea appointed Ricardo García Guereta, who completed the building in 1913. During the Spanish Civil War, it served as a barracks and headquarters for the Falange. Repairs were made in 1943 and 1956 to convert it into the bishop's residence, a purpose never fulfilled. Under the pontificates of Marcelo González Martín and Antonio Briva Miravent, it was promoted as the Museum of the Ways, inaugurated in 1963.

The palace, constructed from grey granite sourced from El Bierzo, adheres to the historicist principles of late 19th and early 20th-century architecture—in this case, in the Neo-Gothic style—and features a Latin cross plan with four facades and four towers at each corner. The initial aim was to combine the characteristics of a castle and a palace, as evidenced by elements such as a moat. The entrance is a portico with three flared arches, separated by slanted buttresses, topped with a pediment; Gaudí had planned to crown the facade with a five-meter-tall angel, but this idea was ultimately not realized. The rear section features an apse, corresponding to the chapel, surrounded by three smaller apsidioles. The ground floor houses a large vestibule, from which the grand staircase rises, its height allowing for triangular windows that provide ample light, a design previously used by Gaudí in the Palau Güell and repeated in other rooms of the episcopal palace, such as the office, throne room, dining room, and bedroom. The building's structure is supported by pillars with decorated capitals and ribbed vaults over glazed ceramic pointed arches. On the exterior, three angel figures, bearing episcopal attributes (mitre, pectoral cross, and crosier), designed by Gaudí as roof finials, remain but were never placed in their intended position.

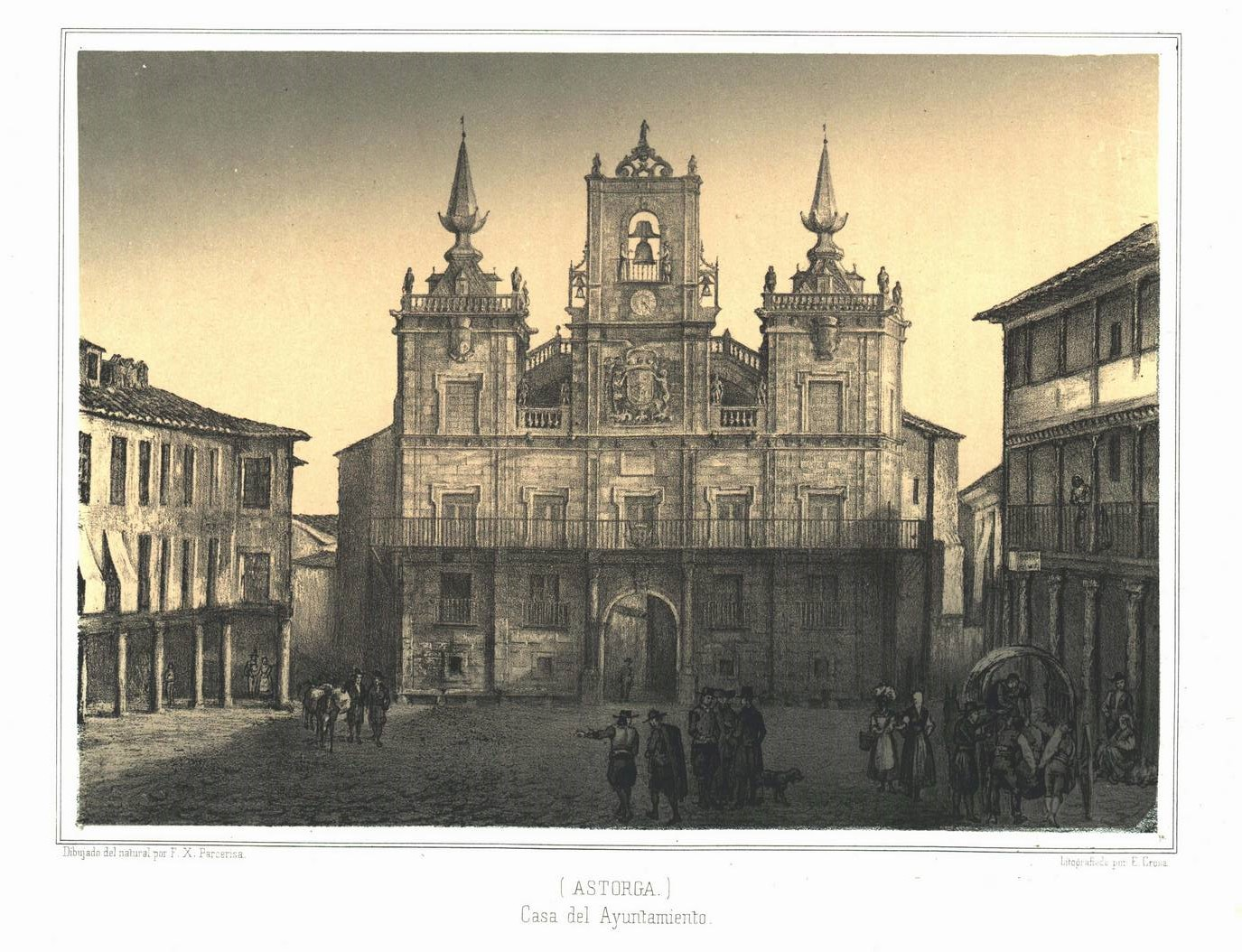
View of the town hall in 1855

==== Town Hall ====
Construction of the town hall began in 1683, based on a design by Francisco de La Lastra, and was completed in 1703. Later additions included balconies (1730, Francisco García Casella), finials on the side towers (1739, José Álvarez de la Viña), and the central bell-gable (1748, Domingo Martínez), which houses the clock and bells, the largest of which is accompanied by two figures dressed as maragatos, named Juan Zancuda and Colasa, who mark the hours by striking it with a mallet. The facade consists of three stories, with a symmetrical axis formed by the semicircular arch at the entrance, the bell-gable, and the royal coat of arms. The sculptural ensemble includes elements functioning as gargoyles and the coats of arms of the city and the marquises of Astorga on the right and left towers, respectively. Inside, the plenary hall stands out, presided over by several commemorative plaques honoring notable figures such as Manuel García Prieto, Pío Gullón Iglesias, Lope María Blanco de Cela, Manuel Gullón y García Prieto, and Marcelo Macías, as well as marking significant dates in the city's history. The building was renovated in 1987 by Andrés Lozano.

==== Other monuments ====
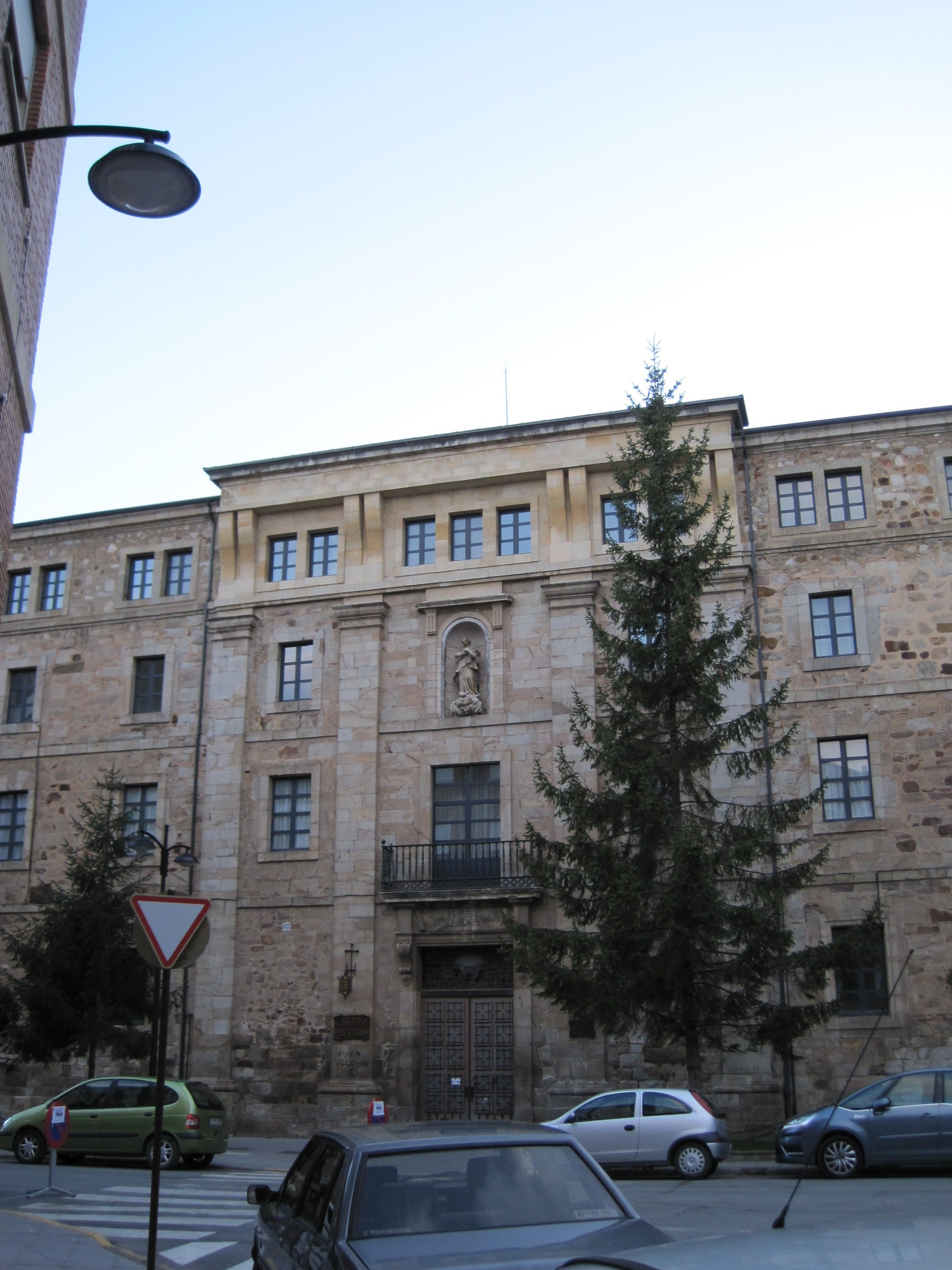
Facade of the Seminary

The city is home to other culturally and architecturally significant buildings, primarily located in the historic center. Among them are the Sanctuary of Fatima, formerly known as the Church of San Julián, which retains four Romanesque capitals in its portal; the Church of San Bartolomé, also originating in the Romanesque style but later modified with Baroque interior decoration, where council meetings were held in its atrium until the town hall was built; the Church of Santa Marta, dedicated to the city's patron saint, constructed in 1741 on the site of an earlier church with a Neoclassical facade and Baroque interior; the Convent of Santa Clara, which faced hardship in 1810 during the Siege of Astorga, when General José María Santocildes fortified its walls against French troops, but resumed housing its community in 1816, unaffected by the confiscations due to its educational activities; the church and convent of San Francisco, from the 13th century, over which the Redemptorist Fathers built a new structure, causing the original convent to be listed among the city's lost heritage; and the Convent of Sancti Spiritus, which dates from the 16th century and features Baroque decorations inside.

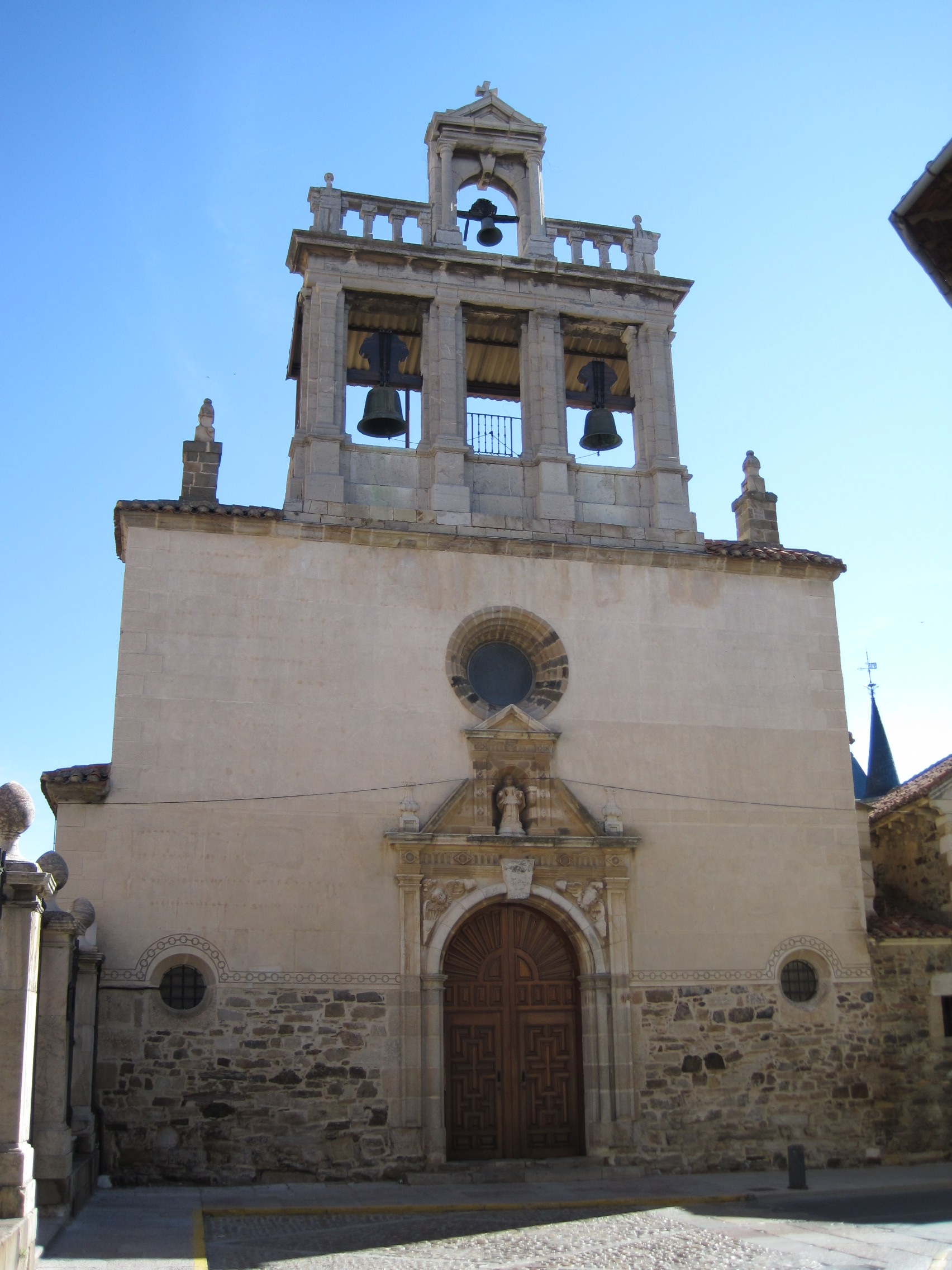
Church of Santa Marta, one of the oldest churches in the city

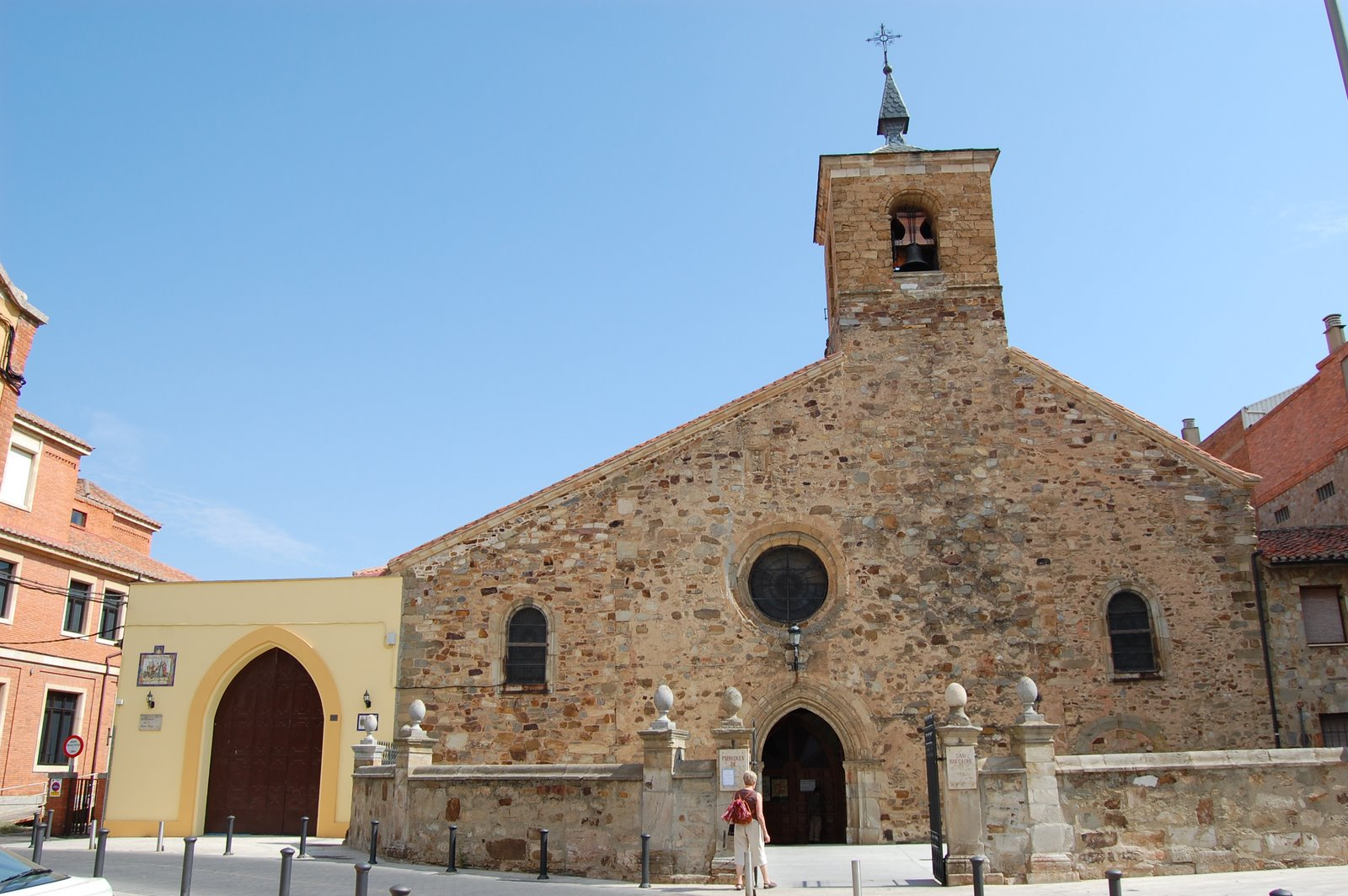
Gable of the Church of San Bartolomé

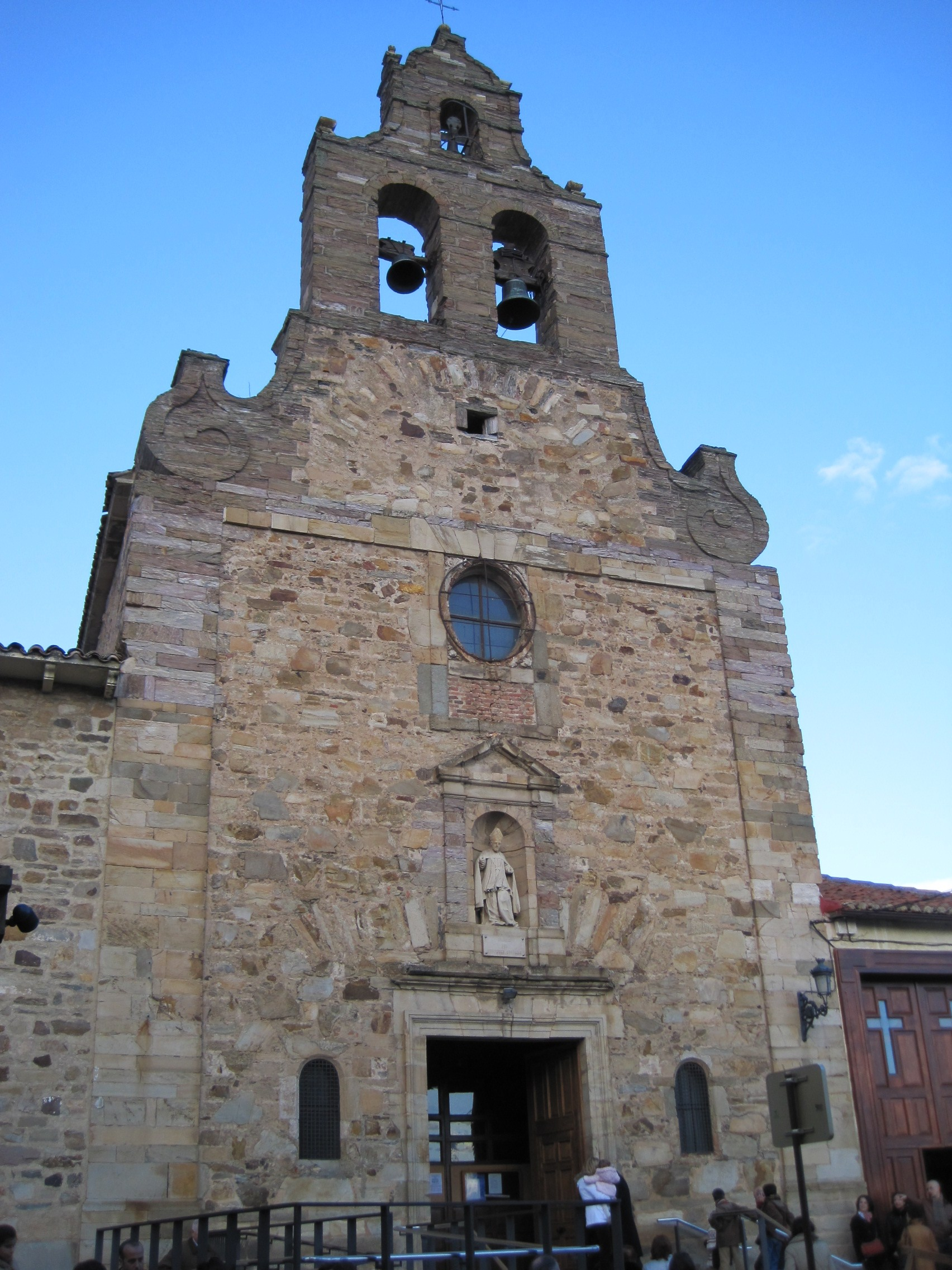
Church of San Francisco

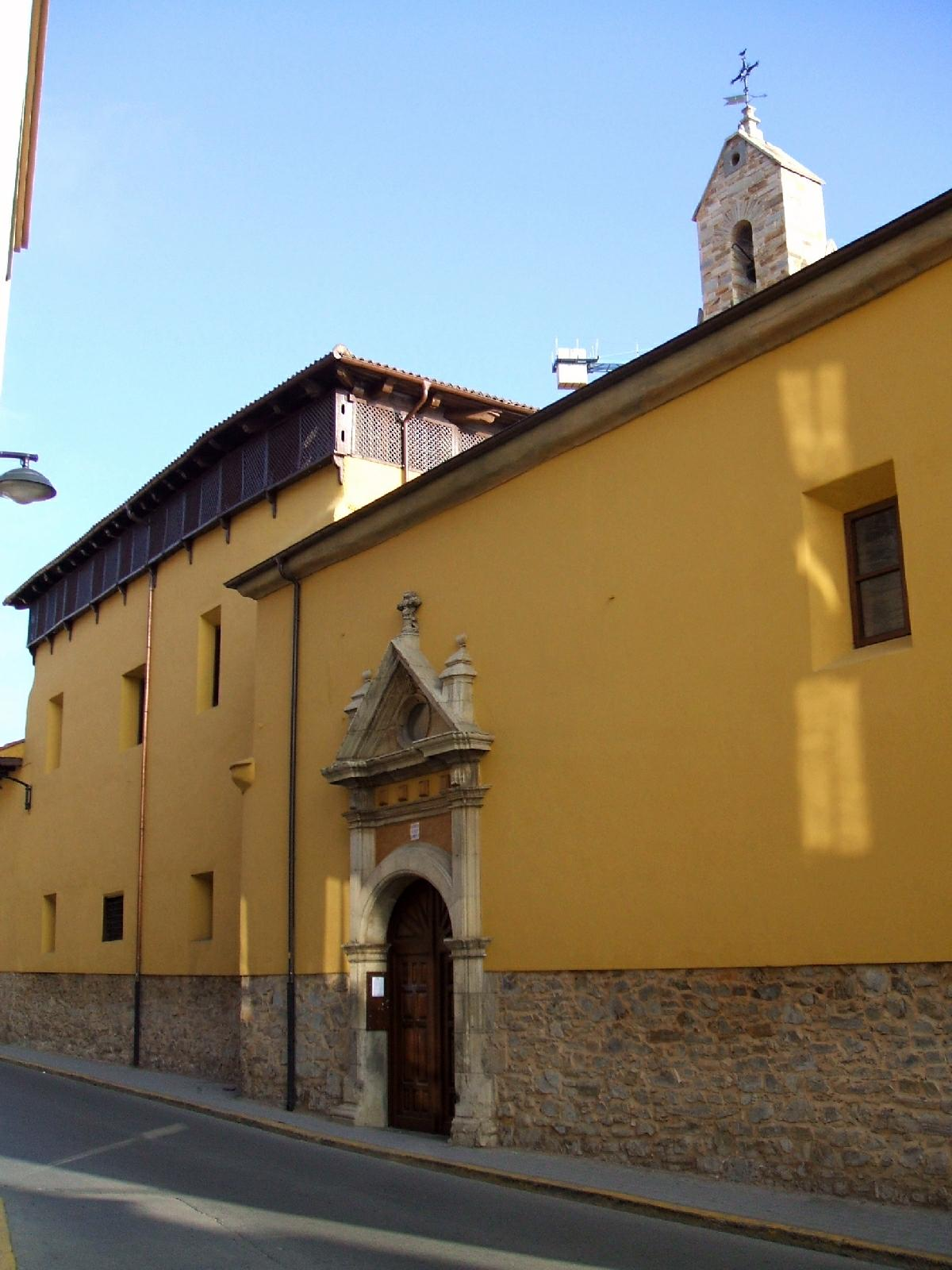
Exterior of the Convent of Sancti Spiritus

Also of religious significance are the Major Seminary, a 1756 structure with a three-story facade in the Herrerian style, featuring three enclosed cloisters and a Neoclassical chapel; the Church of Santa Colomba de Puerta de Rey, established since the 17th century—though the current building results from multiple renovations—near the site of the vanished Convent of San Dictino; the Chapel of Vera Cruz, from the 15th century but rebuilt in 1816; the Church of San Pedro de Rectivía, located along the Camino de Santiago, with a modern design and a facade covered in mosaics installed in the 1990s; and the Church of San Andrés, built in brick in the early 20th century by Hernández Álvarez-Reyero—influenced by Gaudí—following historicist architecture principles with Gothic aesthetics, housing a Baroque altarpiece from the vanished Church of San Miguel. Another building influenced by Modernism is Casa Granell, constructed between 1910 and 1915 by Antonio Palacios Ramilo—known for works such as the Palace of Communications in Madrid—commissioned by a chocolate entrepreneur.

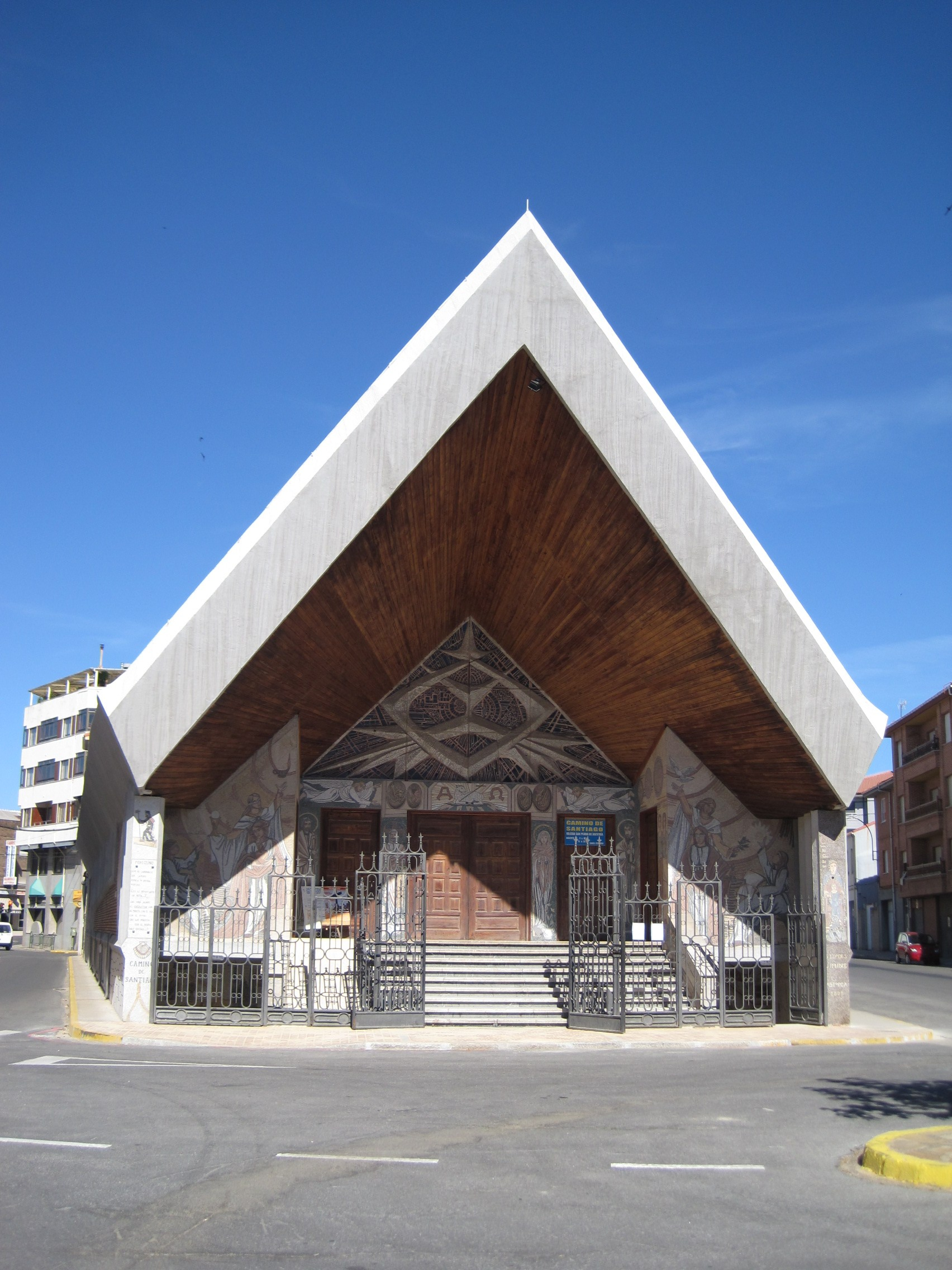
Church of San Pedro de Rectivía

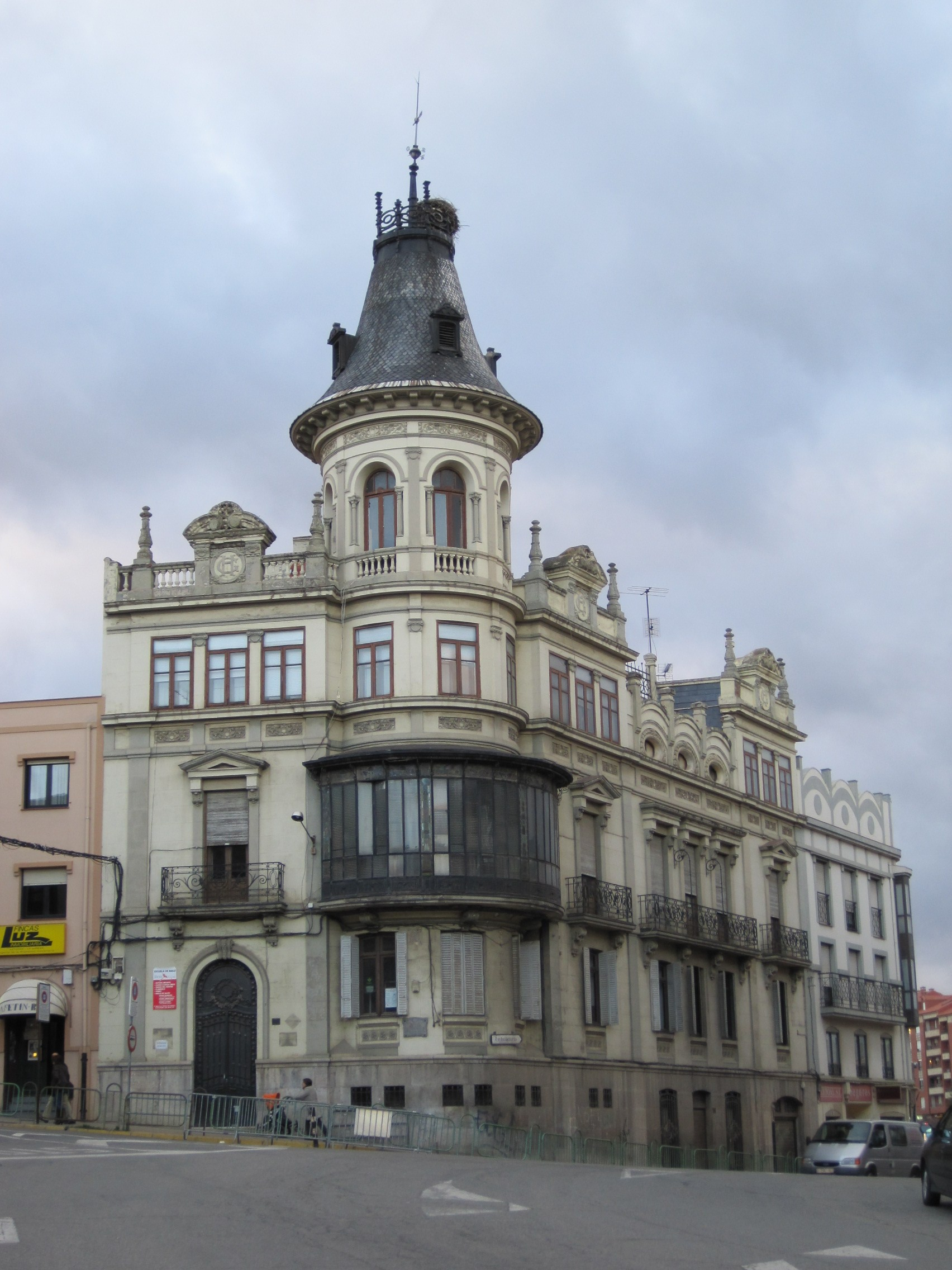
Casa Granell

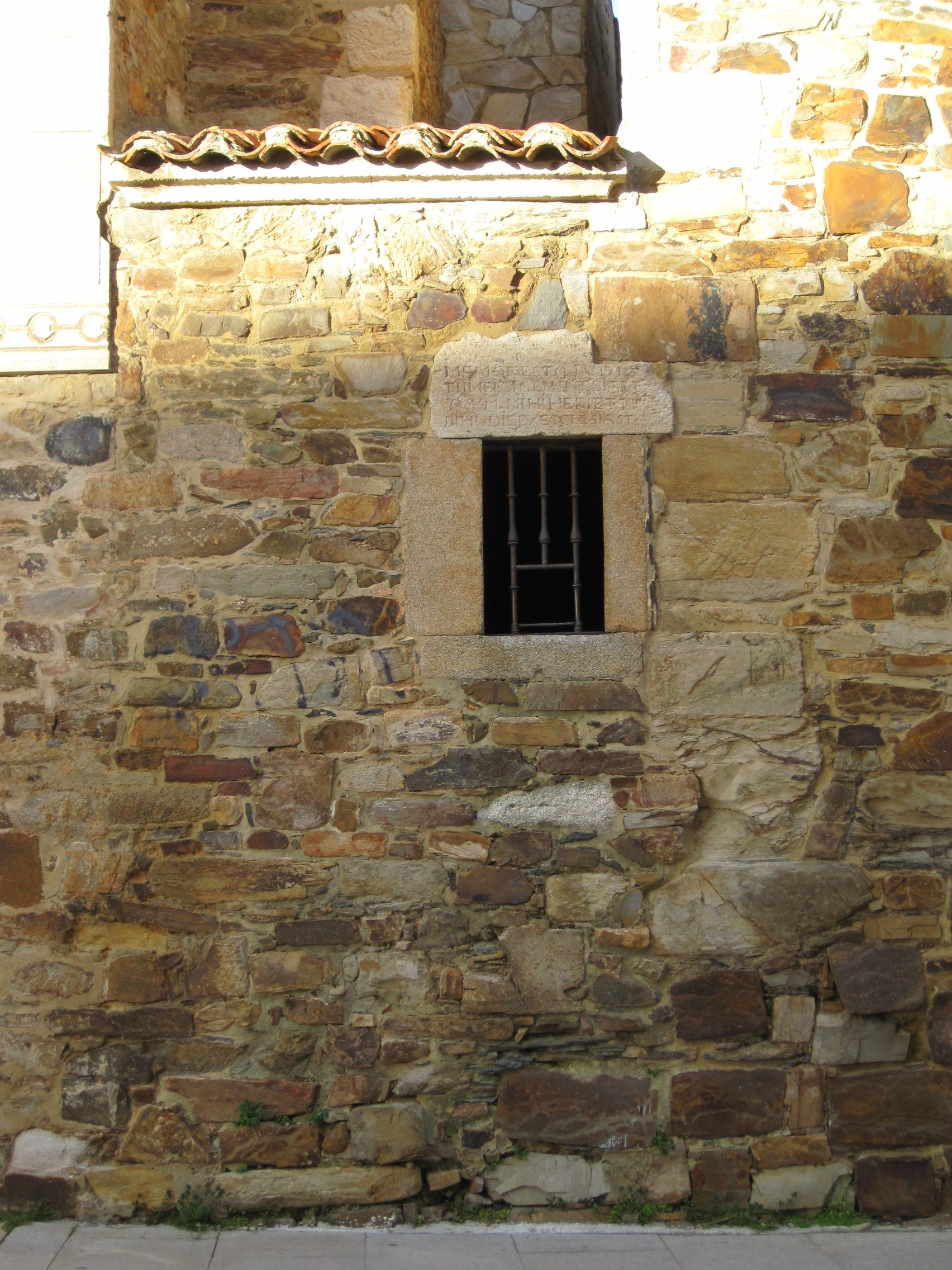
Cell of the Walled-in Women

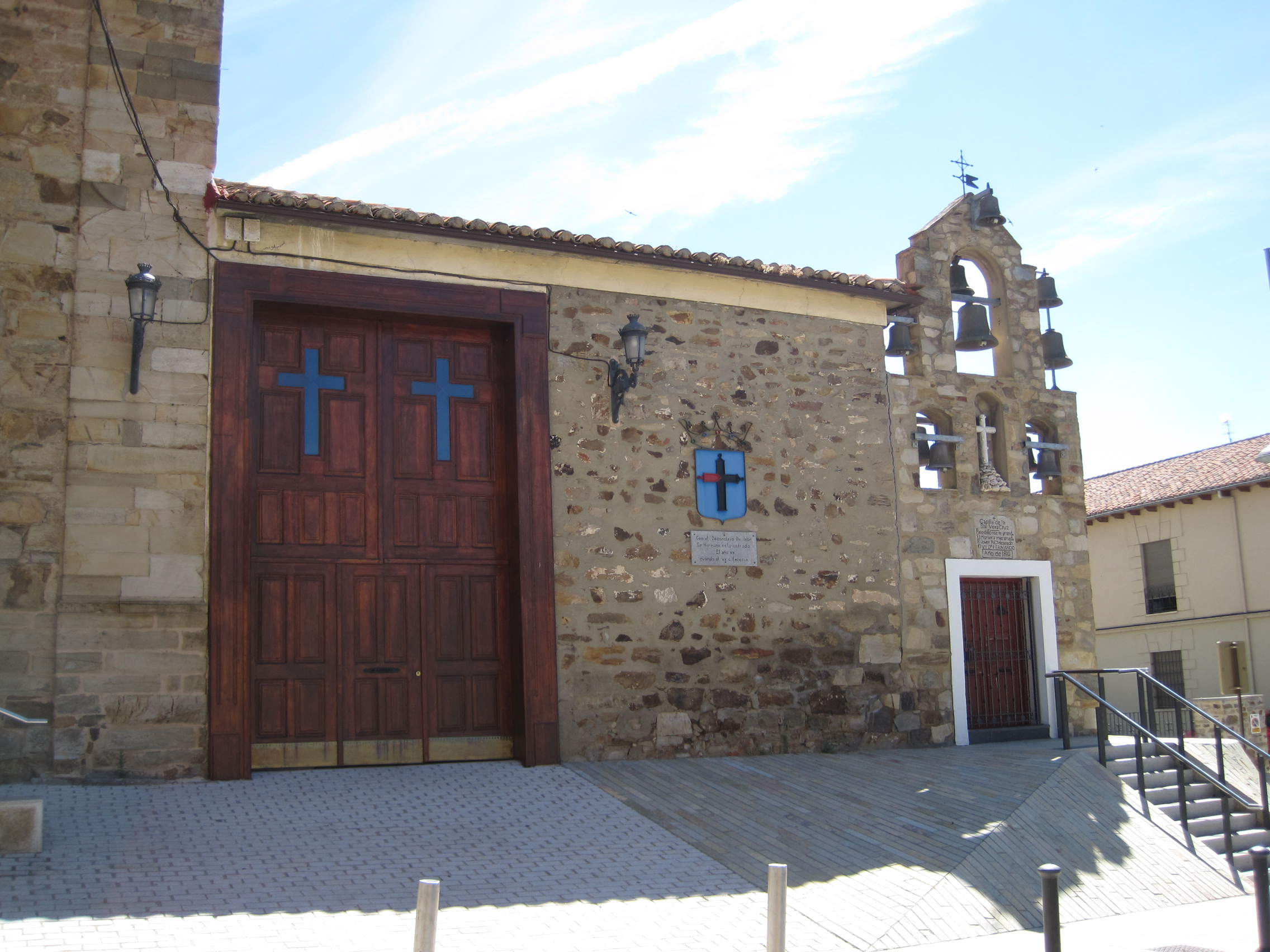
Chapel of Vera Cruz

Other notable structures include the Hospital of the Five Wounds, one of the city's most important pilgrim hospitals, with origins in the 11th century, though only its 18th-century portal remains; and the Cell of the Walled-in Women, a small space between the Chapel of San Esteban and the Church of Santa Marta, used in the Middle Ages by women who enclosed themselves for life as penance, featuring a barred window for receiving charity, above which is the inscription "remember my condition, for it will be yours. me yesterday, you today".

==== Property registrations ====
Between 1998 and 2015, the Catholic Church in Spain registered various properties, a process that sparked controversy according to some authors, including the Secretary of State for Relations with the Cortes and Constitutional Affairs, José Antonio Montilla Martos, who stated that "Articles 206 of the Mortgage Law and 304 of the Mortgage Regulation, which allowed registrations in the name of the Catholic Church, are clearly unconstitutional as they violate Articles 14 and 16 of the Spanish Constitution."

Among the registered properties are several located within the municipal boundaries of Astorga, as listed in "Listado Bienes Iglesia Católica - Definitivo, Page 244 of 931 (Pg. 926)" of the "Study on the Property Registration of Catholic Church Real Estate" published by the Ministry of the Presidency of the Government of Spain on 16 February 2021.

The summary of properties registered in the municipality of Astorga, according to this study, is as follows:

Summary of property registrations in the municipality of Astorga
Type	Plots	Churches	Seminaries	Sanctuaries	Houses	Cathedral	Episcopal Palace	Rural Estates
Quantity	1	4	1	1	1	1	1	5

==== Lost heritage ====
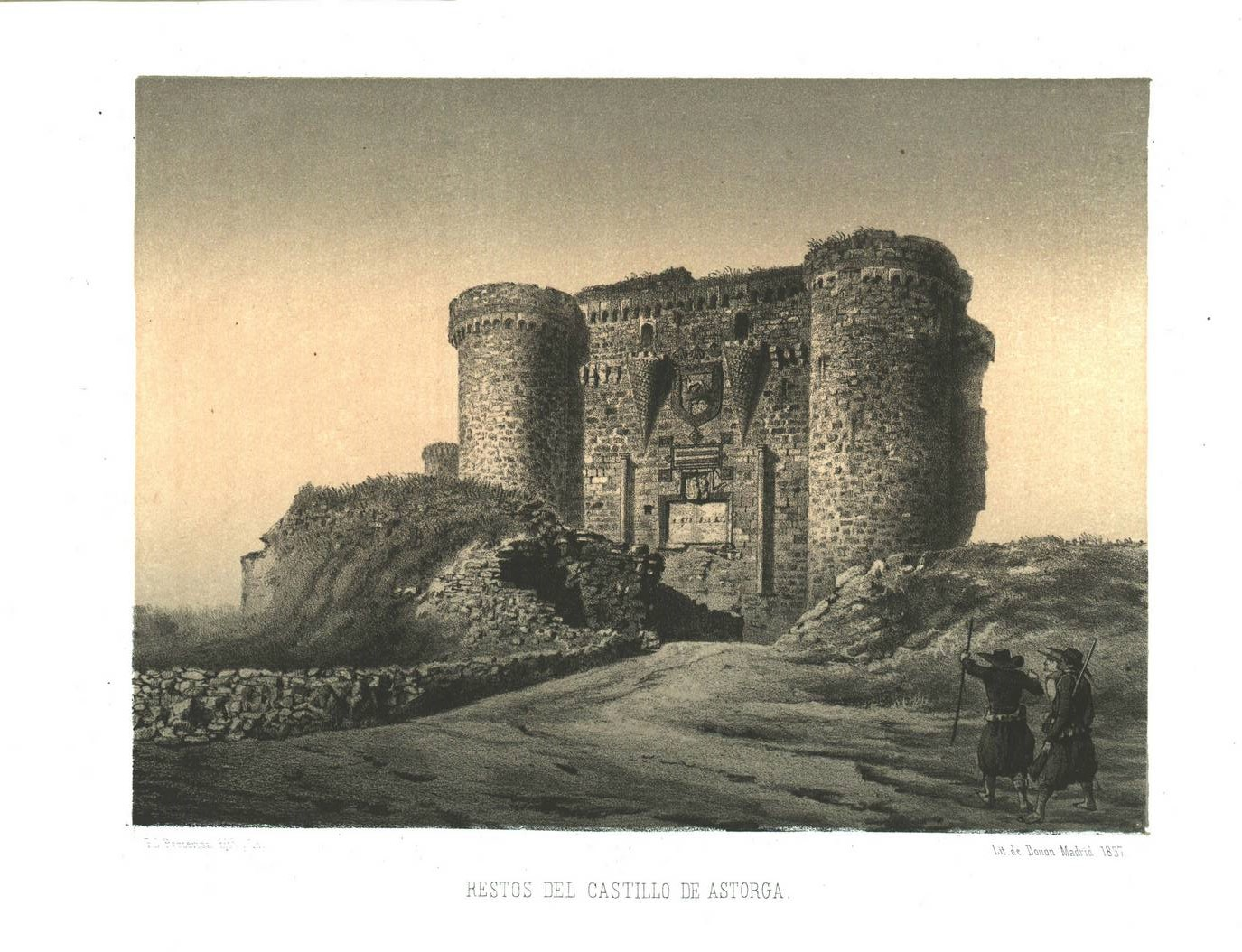
The castle of the marquises in 1857

Astorga, both within the city and its outskirts, once had numerous convents, hospitals, and pilgrim hostels due to its significance as a stopover on the way to Santiago de Compostela and as a crossroads. Most of these buildings have vanished, leaving no physical trace, with their existence known only through historical descriptions and documents. In 1872, the castle—residence of the marquises of Astorga—also disappeared, leaving only the name of a street: Calle del Castillo.

Historical documentation of this lost heritage comes from chronicles written by travelers and historians from the 16th to the 20th centuries, who recorded events and curiosities about the city. Reliable sources also include archives of confraternities, some convents (including those in other towns), and the archive of the León Cathedral, which holds numerous informative records. However, information is limited by the loss or destruction of municipal and cathedral archives during the Spanish War of Independence, confiscations, and the Spanish Civil War, which also form part of the city's lost heritage.

==== Urban sculptures ====
Urban sculptures of Astorga
Name	Year	Author	Image	Name	Year	Author	Image
Monument to the Sieges	1910	Enrique Marín Higuero		The Confraternity Member	2008	Castorina	
Monument to Leopoldo Panero		Marino Amaya		Eleven Sides, Eleven Centuries, One Crown	2011	José Luis de la Iglesia	
Monument to Manuel Gullón				Quo Vadis	2011	Sendo García	
Immaculate Conception	1954	Marino Amaya		Maternity	2013	Castorina	
Monument to the Bimillennium	1986	Castorina					

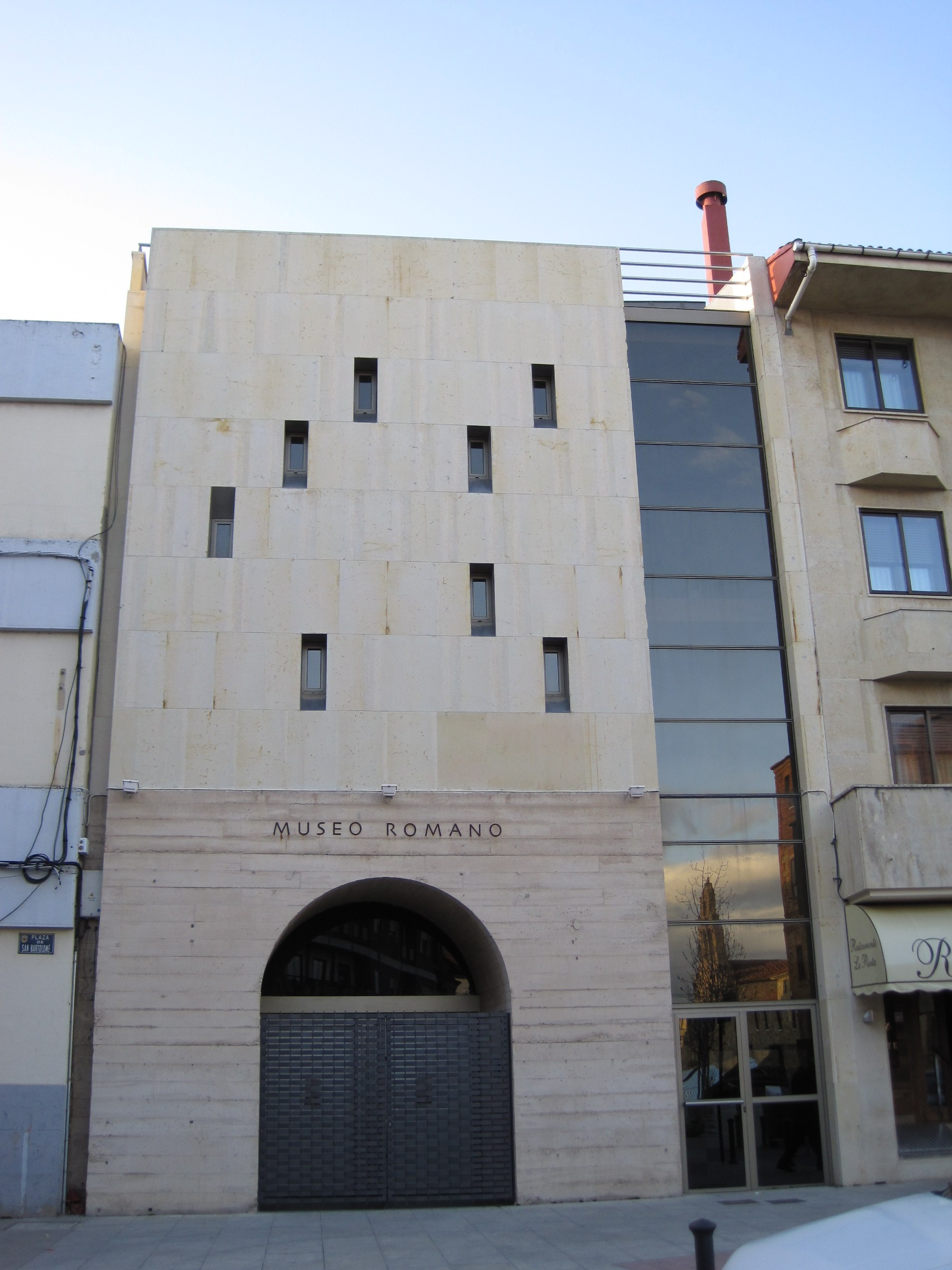
Facade of the Roman Museum, built over the so-called Roman Ergastula

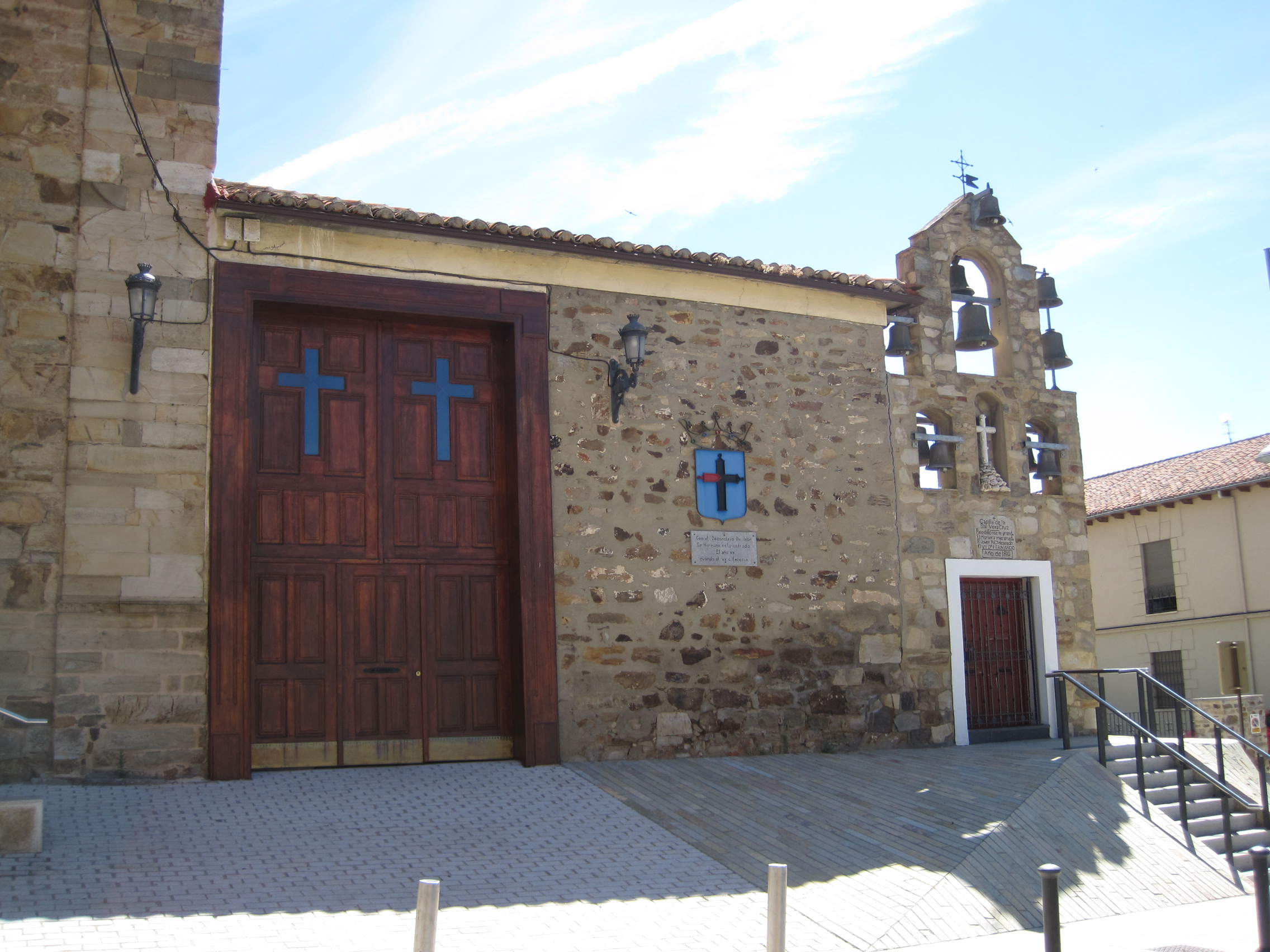
Headquarters of the Confraternity of the Holy Vera Cruz and Confalón, home to the Holy Week Museum

=== Museums, archives, and libraries ===
The visual arts are represented in the Cathedral Museum, the Museum of Roads, and the Holy Week Museum. The Cathedral Museum, planned since 1889 by Bishop Grau, was inaugurated in April 1954 with two rooms under Bishop Jesús Mérida Pérez. Among its early visitors was the future Pope John XXIII, and in 1989, Pope John Paul II visited while on the Camino de Santiago. A 1982 renovation tripled the exhibition space by incorporating the former Cathedral School and Chapter House. It now occupies ten exhibition rooms across two floors, covering 1,400 square meters, housing liturgical and religious works from the cathedral. The Museum of Roads is housed in the Episcopal Palace, reorganized as such in 1962 by Bishop Mérida Pérez, preserving the interior spatial layout. It displays artifacts from the diocese, related to the Camino de Santiago, which required proper storage due to abandonment or conservation needs. Across Gaudí's designed spaces—such as the dining room, official office, throne room, bedroom, chapel, and grand vestibule—are valuable artistic pieces, including Romanesque carvings and medieval goldsmithing. The basement showcases a collection of Roman and medieval archaeology and numismatics, while the upper floor, designed by García Guereta, was adapted in 1975 to exhibit works by contemporary Leonese artists.

While Holy Week imagery is stored independently in the city's parishes and the Episcopal Palace, the Confraternity of the Holy Vera Cruz and Confalón organizes a summer exhibition of its heritage, featuring notable pieces such as the Recumbent Christ, from the early 17th century by Gregorio Español; the Golden Cross, bearing the Lignum Crucis; Jesus Tied to the Column and the Crucified, from the 16th century; and carvings from Levantine workshops. The Roman Museum, a historical museum, is located over the Roman structure known as the Ergastula. After the municipality fully acquired the building in 1996, it was renovated, adding two floors, and opened as a museum in 1999. It exhibits artifacts from city excavations, illustrating the lifestyle of ancient Asturica Augusta from its origins to the late Roman period, forming a significant collection both quantitatively and qualitatively.

Dedicated to its chocolate industry, the city is home to the Chocolate Museum, founded in 1994 by José Luis López García and municipally owned since 2005. It displays objects from the city's 19th-century industrial phase, when the rise of muleteering spurred a nascent chocolate industry in the region. Its unique collection in Spain includes antique machinery, lithographic stones, engraving plates, and collections of chocolate trading cards. Since 2015, it has been housed in a new modernist mansion built by chocolatier Magín Rubio and designed by architect Eduardo Sánchez Eznarriaga. Lastly, dedicated to the so-called "Astorga School", the Casa Panero was inaugurated in August 2011 as the home of the Panero family and a gathering place for Generation of '27 members such as Gerardo Diego and Luis Rosales, housing the works of the School's writers and the legacy of archaeologist José María Luengo.

Astorga also has a municipal library, established in 1931 and reorganized in 1944, located in the former Hospice, a 19th-century building renovated in 1983 for cultural use. Additionally, the city is home to the municipal historical archive, with its oldest document dating to 1253, including one of Spain's two oldest council minutes, dated 27 December 1427, and the Diocesan Archive, established in 1973, housing records from the diocese since 898.

=== Performing arts and bullfighting ===
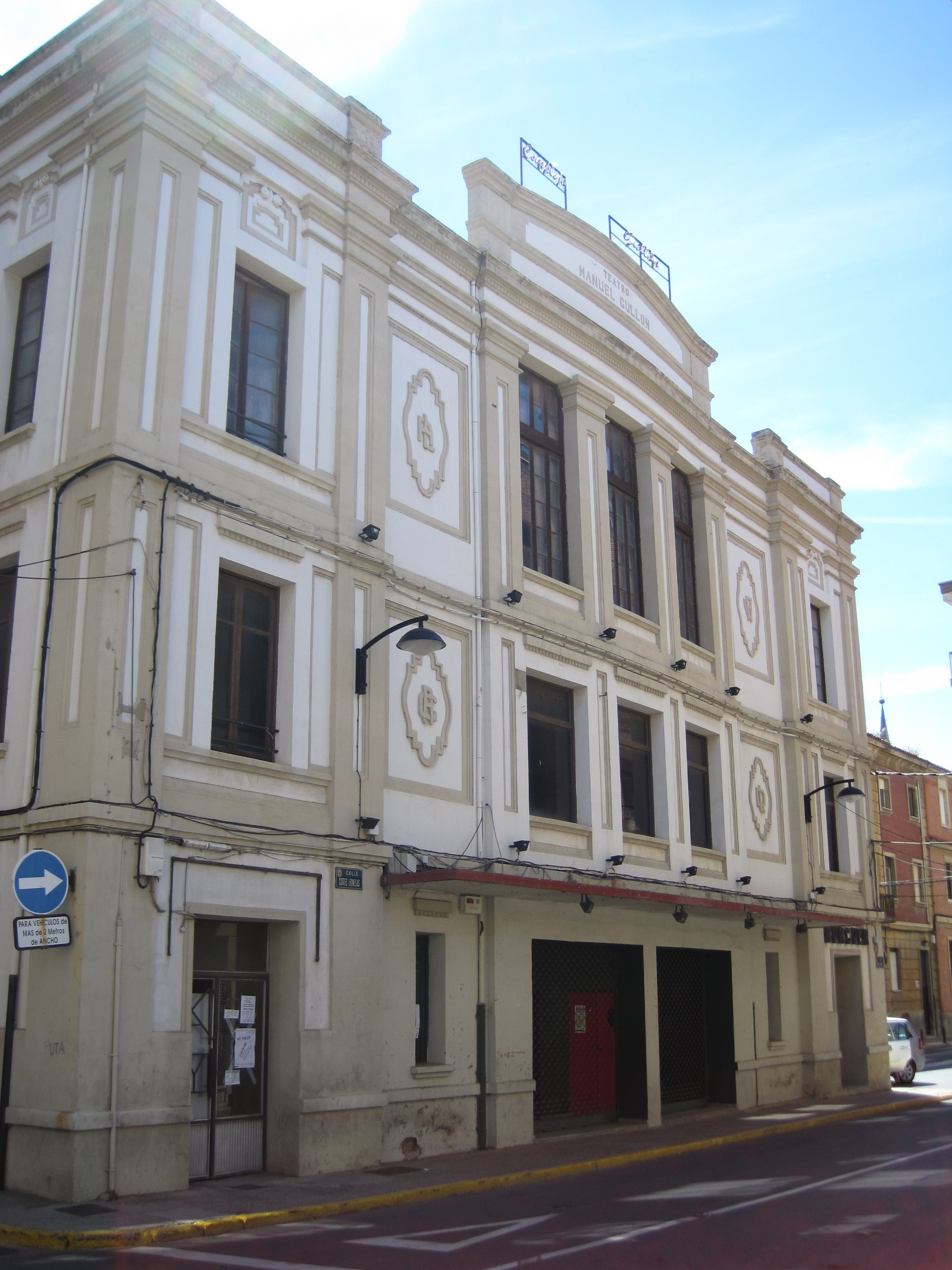
Facade of the Gullón Theatre

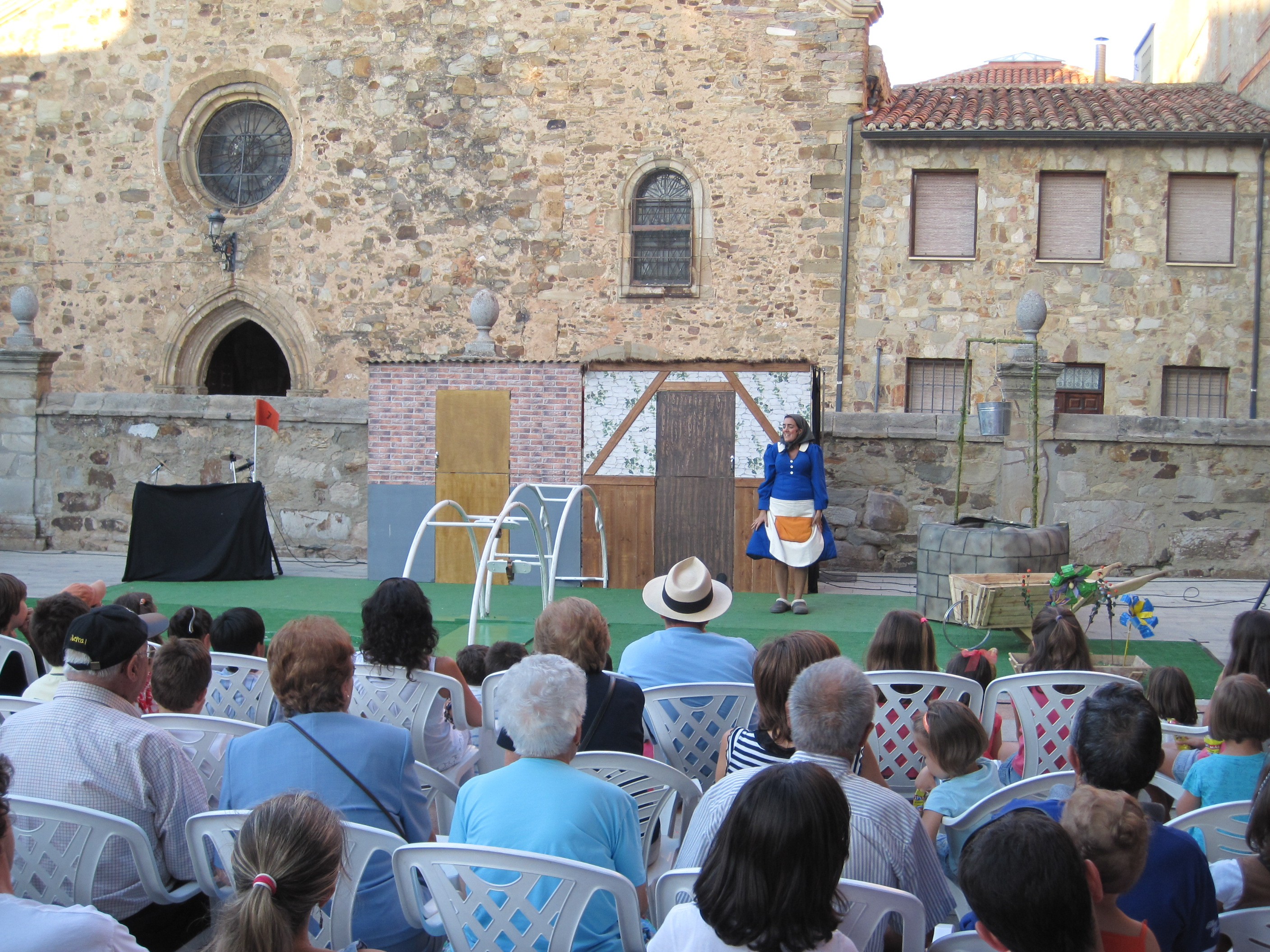
During the Saint Marta patronal festivities, the city hosts events such as street theater

Astorga is home to the Gullón Theatre, inaugurated in 1923. After its closure, it fell into disuse until the 1990s when it was converted into a nightclub. In 2006, the municipality purchased the building, and its restoration began in 2011; after several years of work, it reopened in 2017. The city also has a cinema, originating as a theatre in 1911 and operating as a movie theatre since the 1930s.

Several events related to performance and the arts take place in the city. During Carnival, a magic festival, held since 2004, brings together Spanish and international magicians. In August, during the Santa Marta patronal festivities, the Ars Via street theatre festival features performances by various companies across the city over several days. In September, since 1998, the Astorga Film Festival has been held, featuring a national short film competition alongside activities such as film cycles, exhibitions, and conferences. During Christmas, since 2002, a story adapted for street theatre is performed across the historic center's streets.

Bullfighting is not deeply rooted in Astorga, and the number of enthusiasts is relatively low, but it is common to schedule a bullfight during the Santa Marta festivities. The city has a bullring constructed in the early 20th century, partly using materials from the demolition of the Marquises' castle; prior to its construction, bullfighting events were held in the Plaza Mayor. The most prominent figure in this field from the city is the bullfighter Julio Norte, who made his debut in the Íscar bullring in 1989.

=== Music ===
Music is a prominent element in the cultural life of the city, which has been home to musicians such as Juan de Oliver, composer of Sonatas de Palacio, Evaristo Fernández Blanco, a pioneer of serialism and composer of Obertura Dramática, Venancio Blanco, who compiled Las mil y una canciones populares de la región leonesa, Antonio Celada, and composers of sacred music such as José María Álvarez, Manuel Ansola, and González Barrón. Since the late 20th century, the organist Roberto Fresco has stood out.

The city is home to various musical groups, among which the municipal band, founded in 1894, stands out, though its origins date back at least to 1841. Other ensembles represent a wide variety of musical styles, including choral, instrumental, Celtic, and rock, as well as the various bands that perform during Holy Week.

In July, the International Music Course, held annually since 1993, takes place and is considered a benchmark for music education in Castile and León, as it is the only one offering all orchestral and band specialties. Also in the summer, the Music in the Cathedral series is held, featuring various sacred music concerts. Another musical event is the band competition, which offers a varied repertoire of processional marches each year in the days leading up to Holy Week.

=== Festivals and events ===
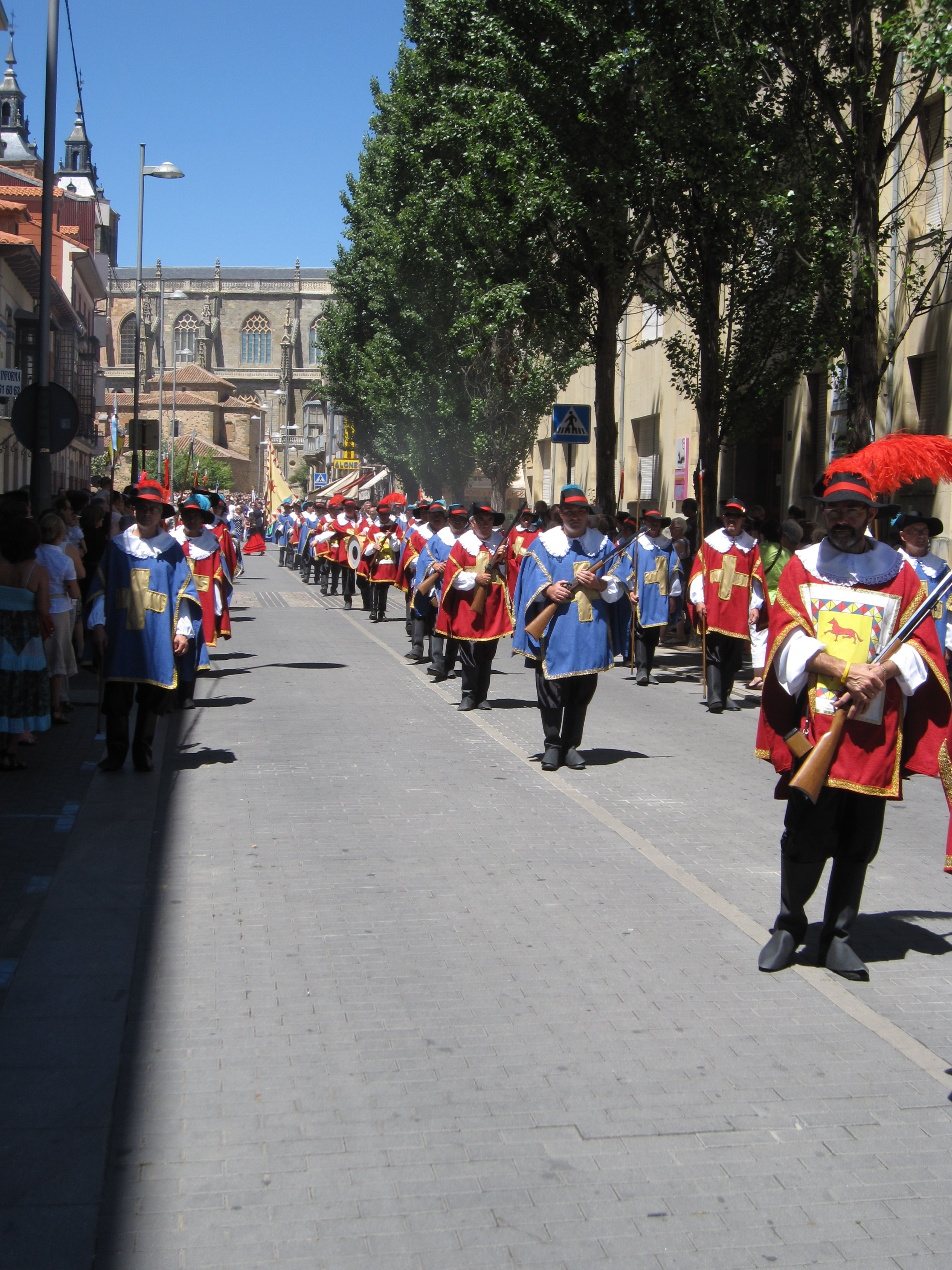
Zuiza Parade

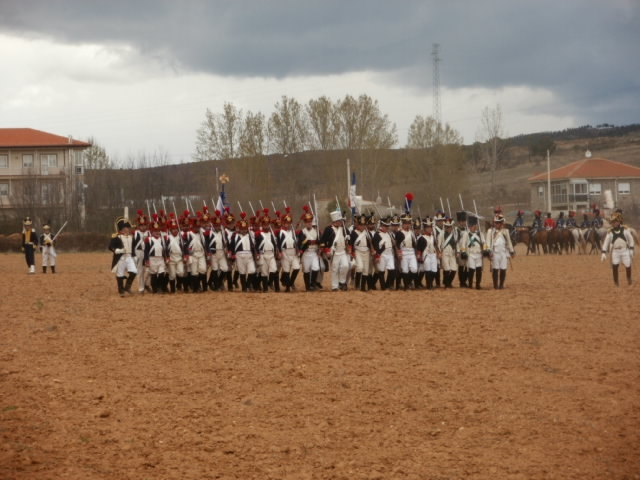
In April 2012, the bicentennial of the reconquest of Astorga by Spanish troops during the Spanish War of Independence was commemorated

Throughout the year, several cultural and festive events take place in the city. Chronologically, in mid-January, the Puerta de Rey parish celebrates the feast of Saint Anthony with the traditional procession and blessing of pets. In February, the San Pedro de Rectivía parish honors Our Lady of Candelaria with a procession through the neighborhood. In the same month, on a movable date, Carnival festivities begin on Piñata Saturday, the first Saturday after Ash Wednesday, with a parade featuring over a hundred groups, bands, and floats; the weekend concludes with the burning of the Piñata on Sunday night. In mid-April, the feast of the patron saint Turibius is celebrated, complemented since the early 21st century with a trade fair and a tapas competition among the city's restaurants. On a movable date, in years of drought, it is traditional to hold nine days of prayers in the cathedral to the Virgin of Castrotierra, brought from her sanctuary seventeen kilometers away in a procession involving residents of nearby regions along with the pennons of each locality, with the transfer decided by the vote of the Procurators of the Land.

On a movable date, the Corpus Christi procession is held. In June, every three years, the Zuiza festival is celebrated, an ancient commemoration of the Christian victory at the Battle of Clavijo, revived in 1994, during which the Clavijo Pennon—kept in the Town Hall—is processed, receiving honors as a captain general and escorted by fifty zuizones. At the end of the same month, the San Andrés and San Pedro de Rectivía neighborhoods celebrate their festivals with traditional games and evening parties, among other events.

At the end of July, the Astures and Romans Festival is celebrated, originating in 1986 and declared a Festival of Regional Tourist Interest in 2011; it commemorates the city's ancient past with events such as the Roman circus, Roman market, and the establishment of a Roman camp and Astur settlement in Melgar Park. At the end of August, the city's patronal festivals in honor of Santa Marta take place, featuring evening parties, concerts, street theater, parades of giants and big heads, sports competitions, an artisan fair, and the traditional "Long Night", the highlight of the festivities with uninterrupted music until dawn.

Finally, on movable dates—the first edition was in 2004—the Napoleonic Days are held, commemorating the events of the War of Independence, when the city endured two sieges by French troops. The 2012 edition marked the bicentennial of the city's reconquest by General Santocildes.

=== Holy Week ===
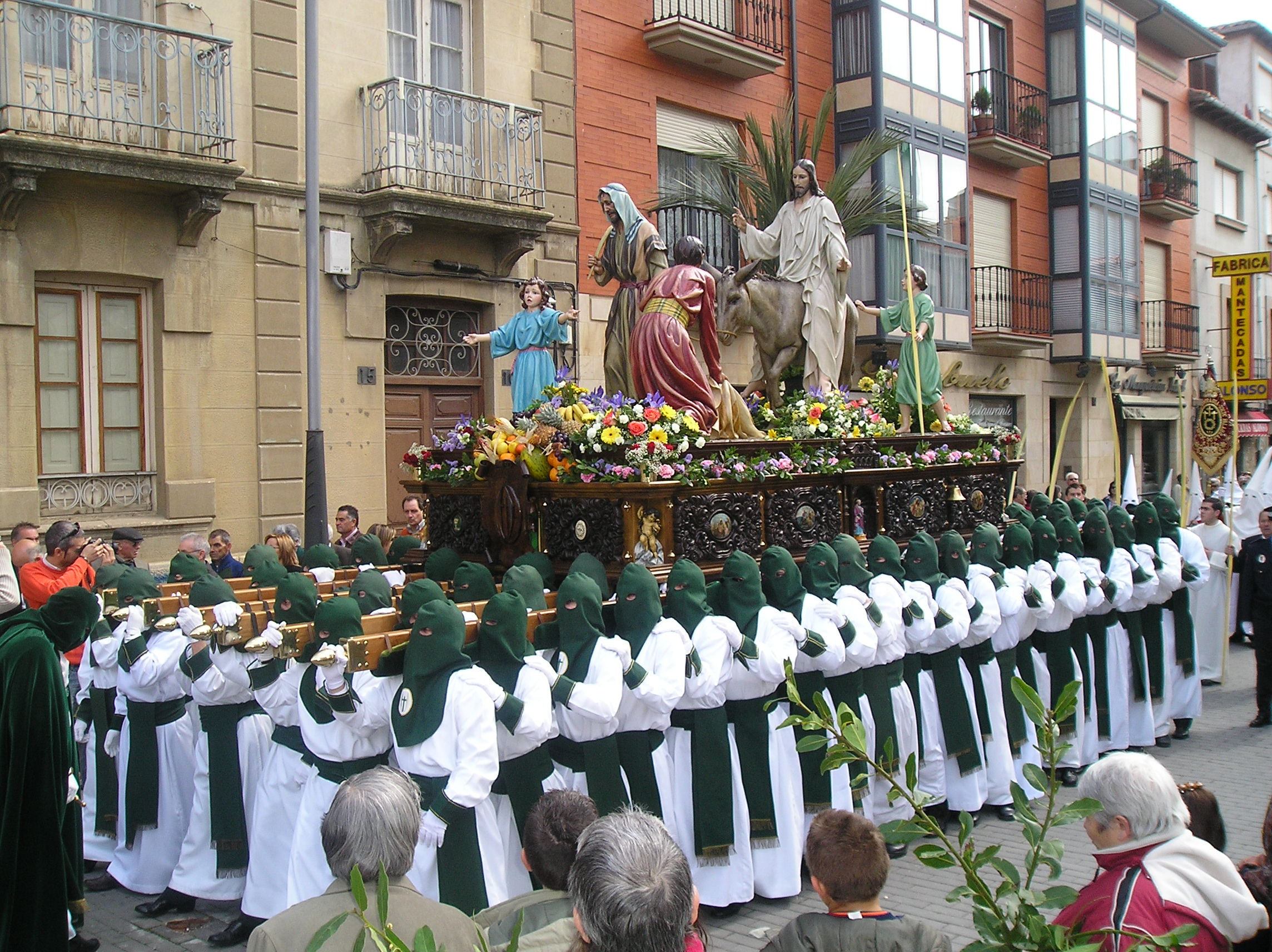
Float of La Borriquilla, processed on the morning of Palm Sunday

Holy Week in Astorga is declared a Festival of National Tourist Interest and a Festival of Regional Tourist Interest, during which eight brotherhoods and confraternities, along with the Holy Week Promotion Board, process a total of forty floats. These eight include the Brotherhood of the Holy True Cross and Confalón, one of the oldest in the country, with its earliest document dating to 1475, the Royal Brotherhood of Our Father Jesus Nazarene and Most Holy Mary of Solitude, from 1674, the Archconfraternity of Our Lady of Sorrows, from 1911, the Brotherhood of the Knights of Silence of Our Father Jesus Nazarene, from 1926, the Brotherhood of the Blessed Christ of the Afflicted, from 1943, the Brotherhood of the Entry of Jesus into Jerusalem, from 1953, the Brotherhood of the Last Supper, from 1969, and the Brotherhood of the Ladies of the Virgin of Piety, from 1992.

Among the most notable events are the Way of the Cross, organized by the Holy Week Promotion Board and involving all brotherhoods; some of the events on Good Friday, such as the Encounter procession—with the traditional San Juanín race—, the Descent from the Cross in the Plaza Mayor, or the Solitude procession; and the Resurrection procession on Easter Sunday. Among the religious imagery, standout pieces include the Crucified Christ, from 1560, the Blessed Christ of the Afflicted, from the late 17th century, the Virgin of Solitude, also from the late 17th century, the Virgin of Sorrows, a 1706 work by José de Rozas, the Jesus Nazarene, from 1783, and the Golden Cross, from 1789. Alongside the religious aspects, various customs accompany the celebration during Holy Week, such as "killing Jews" or eating bolla—a pastry made of flour, honey, and milk—paired with muscat wine.

=== Cultural life ===
Since the 19th century, Astorga has been a significant cultural center. Among its earliest notable authors are Bishop Sampiro, who between the 10th and 11th centuries wrote the Chronicle bearing his name, and Juan Lorenzo de Astorga, author, between the 13th and 14th centuries, of manuscript O of the Libro de Alexandre.

The Church and its members played a prominent role in literary production; thus, figures emerged such as Alfonso de la Madre de Dios, with his 1618 work Chronica de la reforma de su religión, Pedro Aingo de Ezpeleta, who published in 1634 Fundación de la Santa, Cathedral Iglesia de la ciudad de Astorga, and Pedro Junco, who in 1639 published Fundación, armas y nombres de Astorga. To these should be added the extensive documentary production generated by the diocese. In the 19th century, a range of authors gained prominence, including, among others, Marcelo Macías and Francisco Blanco García, author of Spanish Literature in the 19th Century, both from the ecclesiastical sphere, jurists such as Alfonso de Villadiego, Mateo Martínez Moreda, Manuel García Prieto, and Manuel Prieto de Castro, and the bibliographer Andrés Martínez Salazar.

At the beginning of the 20th century, the wealth generated by the chocolate industry fostered the emergence of a prosperous bourgeoisie, among whose descendants a true "cultural Parnassus" was born, with poets such as Juan Panero and Leopoldo Panero, literary critics such as Ricardo Gullón, and writers such as Luis Alonso Luengo, all part of the so-called "Astorga School". In the following years, this cultural splendor was enriched by other poets such as Eugenio de Nora and Esteban Carro Celada, novelists such as José María Goy, intellectuals such as Julio Carro, and scholars such as Augusto Quintana Prieto, Eduardo Aragón, and José María Luengo, as well as literary gatherings and debates held in various city venues such as the Café Moderno, Café Iris, and Gran Café Universal. Additionally, several theatrical societies were established, affiliated with the Casino, the Catholic Circle, the Segura cultural center, La Unión, and the Friendship Society.

Since the last decades of the 20th century, the city's cultural life has been driven not only by the various events held but, especially, by the more than fifty associations that exist, which organize numerous cultural activities and events throughout the year. These include social, cultural, sports, parents', and neighborhood associations.

=== Language ===
"Pastorcicus semus, d'Uriente venimus, bulsillus trayemus, diñeiro pidimus. Que Dios vus lo dea para nus lu dar. L'astrella nus guia a este santu hogar."
Shepherds' song for Epiphany.

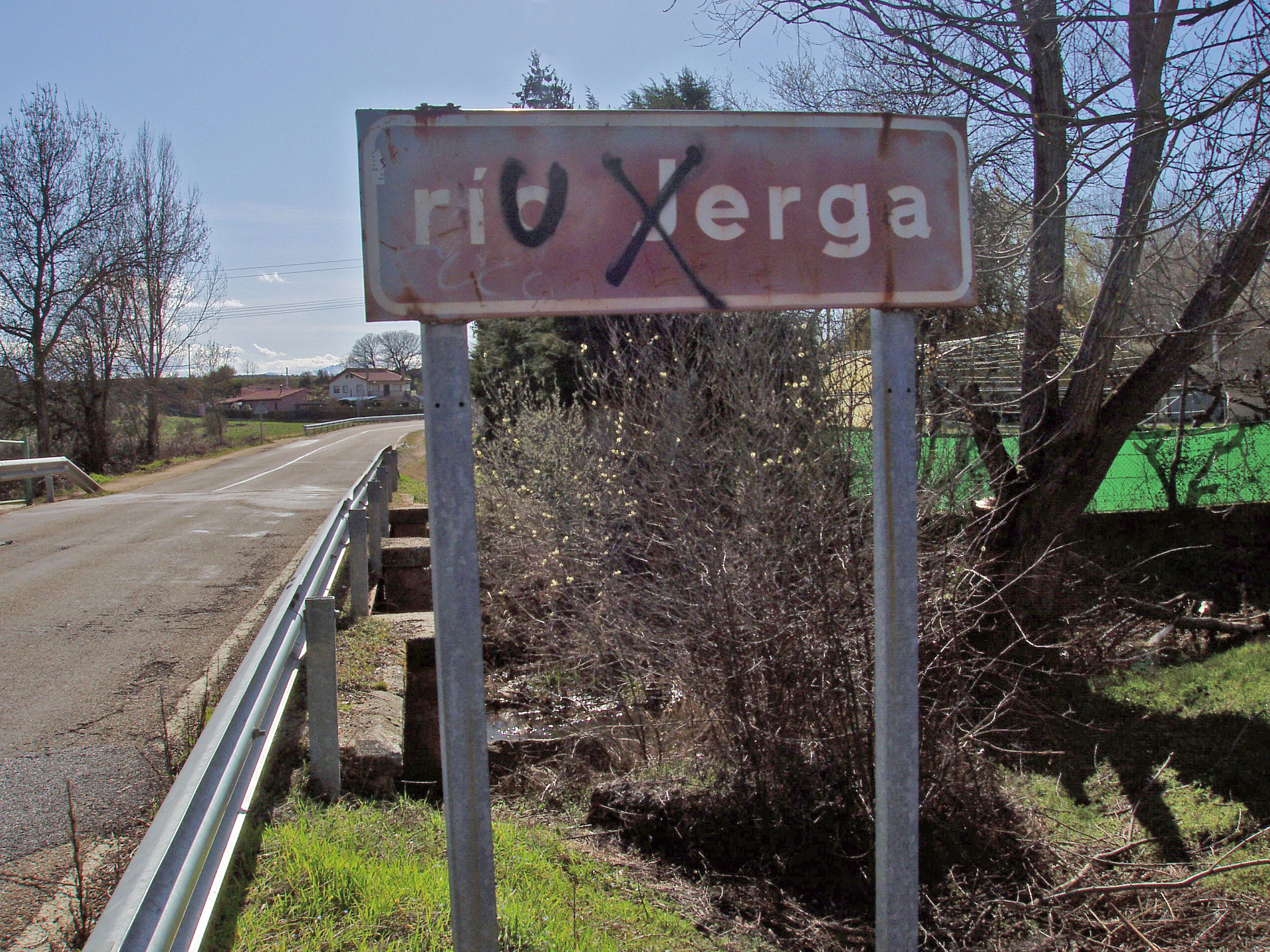
Protest graffiti advocating for the use of traditional toponymy on road signs

The language spoken in the municipality is Spanish or Castilian, but until the 20th century, numerous forms derived from Leonese, belonging to the western variant of Asturleonese, persisted in everyday speech in Astorga and its surroundings, as well as in Maragatería. Phonetically, some of the main features included the diphthongization of /o/ and /e/, the preservation of falling diphthongs, the inflection of the tonic vowel, the substitution of final /o/ with /u/, and the retention of the initial Latin /f-/. In terms of morphology, notable features included a scarcity of prefixes and, conversely, an abundance of suffixes, especially diminutives, and regarding its verbal system, the absence of compound tenses and the placement of personal pronouns after the verb.

In recent years, various groups such as La Caleya and Faceira have undertaken efforts to defend and promote the Leonese linguistic heritage through activities such as organizing Leonese language courses, informative talks, and literary competitions. In collaboration with the Culture Department of the Junta of Castile and León, the Provincial Council of León—through the Leonese Institute of Culture—and the Astorga City Council, several traditional Leonese story competitions were held, involving schoolchildren up to 14 years old from the province of León; the stories, written in the linguistic variants of León—Leonese, Galician, and Castilian—were compiled in the book Cuentos populares leoneses (escritos por niños). Likewise, as a result of the collaboration between the cultural associations Facendera pola Llengua and La Caleya, in 2009, El Prencipicu was published, a version in the Cabreirés dialect of the work by French writer Antoine de Saint-Exupéry, The Little Prince. The book emerged from pedagogical work with seven Cabreira students at the Astorga IES student residence within the so-called Cabreira Culture Classroom.

=== Traditional clothing ===
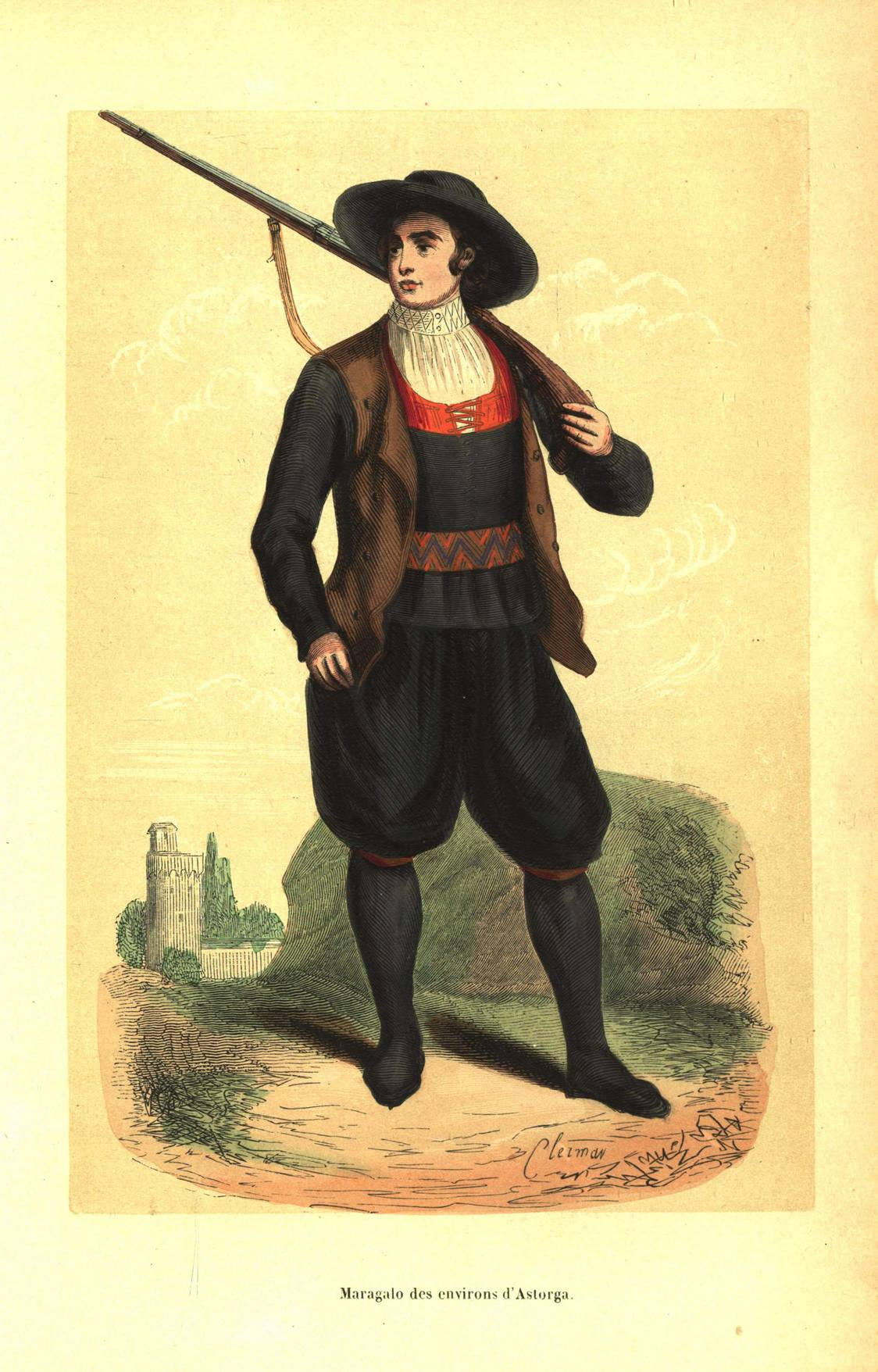
Illustration of a maragato from the mid-19th century

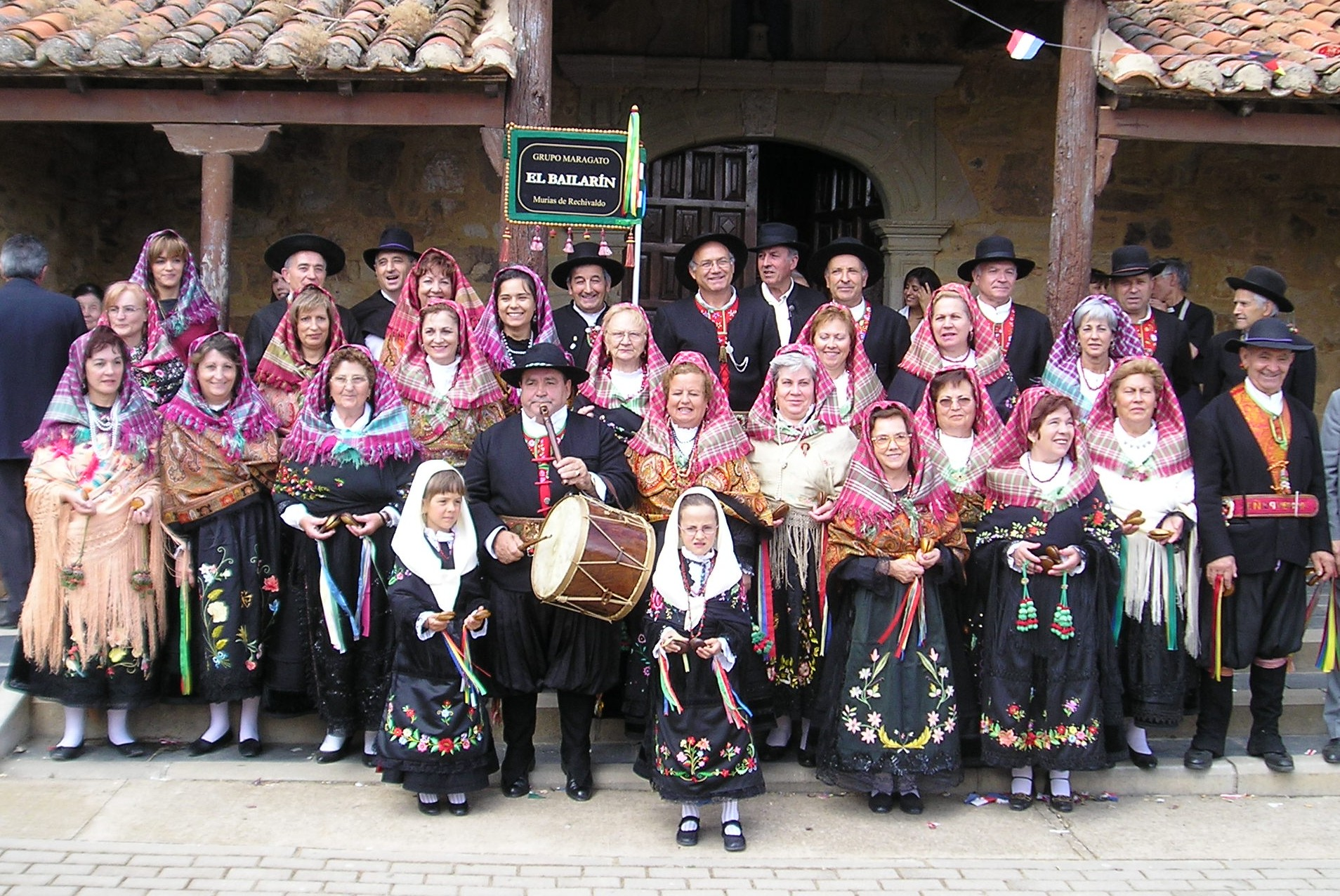
Group of maragatos from Murias de Rechivaldo

An important part of Maragato folklore is its traditional clothing. The typical muleteer outfit, used during the 18th, 19th, and early 20th centuries, is notable among traditional attire for its continued daily use until a relatively late date; it is categorized as an occupational outfit, worn during travel, and is characterized by its functionality, with materials and shapes that protected against the elements and facilitated muleteer activities, evolving little over time, making it distinctly different from the clothing of other Leonese comarcas, unlike women's clothing, which progressively lost variety and distinctiveness.

The men's outfit consisted of a shirt, vest, waistcoat, breeches or trousers, a belt—embroidered for festive days and dancing, according to social status—gaiters, shoes, a hat, and a cape. Some of these garments, such as the waistcoat or breeches, appear to date back to the 16th or 17th centuries, according to various authors; the latter are somewhat unique compared to those used in other Spanish comarcas, being wide or baggy breeches, finding similarity only in the traditional attire of Mallorca.

The women's outfit is an evolution of the ancient attire, influenced by the clothing of neighboring areas and lacking the originality of the men's attire, but it retains great richness in terms of garments and accessories. It consists of a white skirt, a zagalejo (in cloth of various colors, depending on the wearer's social status), a faltriquera—an inner pocket—a manteo, an apron—embroidered in silk or felt, depending on social status—a doublet, a neck scarf, a headscarf—different for single and married women—a mantle for religious ceremonies, ribbons and white lace, shoes, and jewelry—earrings or chokers, pendants, and rings. An exception to this typology is the outfit of the May Queens, young dancers, which is more vibrant and colorful than the traditional Maragato attire, featuring red, green, and white prominently.

=== Crossroads of paths ===
Due to its location and historical development, Astorga has been a meeting and departure point for paths, peoples, and cultures since ancient times. During the Roman period, it was connected to the main cities of the time through several communication routes. In the so-called Astorga Tablets from the 3rd century, various routes mentioning Asturica are cited. Also in the 3rd century, the Antonine Itinerary indicates the network of communications linking the city with Bracara Augusta (Braga) via route XVIII, or through Lucus Augusti (Lugo) on route XIX, to Augusta Emerita (Mérida), to Tarragona via Caesaraugusta (Zaragoza) on route XXXII or Ab Asturica Terracone, or with Bordeaux, via route XXXIV or Ab Asturica Burdigalam: practically to the four cardinal points of Hispania Tarraconensis, through which troops, travelers, and products, mainly gold from Las Médulas, were transported. (Note: Asturica became a communications hub in western Hispania, as recorded in the Antonine Itinerary, compiled during the reign of Emperor Caracalla (211 to 217 CE).)

From the south, the so-called Silver Route connected Mérida with Astorga (Iter ab Emeritam Asturica) and centuries later coincided in parts with the Cañada Real de la Vizana, along which transhumant herds traveled from Extremadura to the Leonese mountains. (Note: This route was used by the Arabs to penetrate the northern peninsula. They named it B'lata, meaning "well-paved road.") In modern times, it forms part of one of the main communication routes structuring western Spain, from Gijón to Seville, via the N-630 and the Silver Route motorway/highway; various institutions promote this axis as a tourist route called the Silver Route, which has generated controversy, as historical evidence defines its route exclusively between Mérida and Astorga, and the Association of Silver Route Towns, chaired by the Astorga mayor's office, has carried out protest actions since 2006 against the artificial extension of the Route.

To the east, the road connecting Asturica with Legio, which then continued to Caesaraugusta, was used as the Camino de Santiago and became the basis for the current N-120. To the west, the road to Lucus Augusti and Gallaecia also became, centuries later, a section of the Camino de Santiago, which, leaving Astorga, passes through Foncebadón, Ponferrada, and Villafranca del Bierzo, among other places. Around these main routes, other paths were woven, such as those used by muleteers or for razzias, utilized by Tariq, Musa, or Almanzor, as well as by French troops during the Spanish War of Independence. All these routes were always active, contributing to the exchange of people and cultures and the introduction of various artistic styles. Currently, Astorga preserves the history of some of these communication routes in the Museum of the Paths, established in 1962.

Camino de Santiago

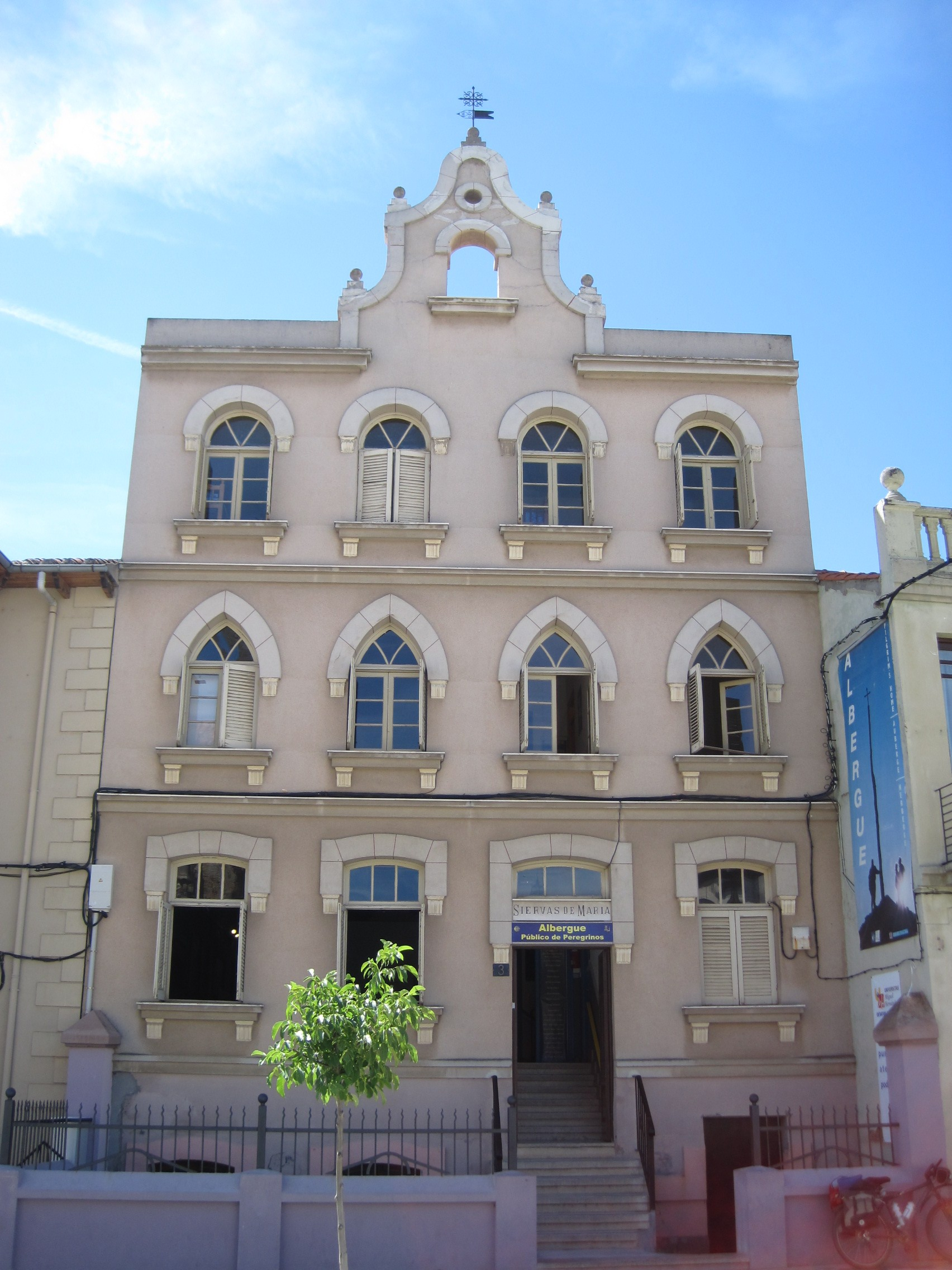
Exterior view of the Siervas de María pilgrim hostel

Of the various pilgrimage routes to Santiago de Compostela, the most widely used and well-known since the Middle Ages is the French Way, which originated from the Roman road Ab Asturica Burdigalam. Its route reaches Astorga from the town of San Justo de la Vega, entering the city through the former Sun Gate, which no longer exists. The pilgrim continues through San Francisco (formerly Calle de las Tiendas), Plaza Mayor, Pío Gullón (previously Rúa Nueva), Santiago Crespo, Santiago (formerly Caleya Yerma), and arrives in front of the Episcopal Palace, the Church of Santa Marta, and the cathedral. From there, the pilgrim proceeds through Leopoldo Panero, San Pedro, reaching the modern San Pedro Church in the Rectivía suburb. Crossing the N-6, the path continues toward the Foncebadón Pass.

During the Middle Ages, the city had numerous hostels or hospitals for pilgrims. Some, such as the Hospital of San Juan Bautista, where according to tradition Saint Francis spent a few days recovering, gave rise to modern charitable institutions, but most disappeared over the centuries, leaving only their memory and some descriptions in preserved documentation. Until the late 1980s, pilgrims found shelter and lodging through the congregation of the Brothers of Our Lady of Lourdes, but since then, these services have been provided, on one hand, by the Association of Friends of the Camino de Santiago in Astorga, which, after operating in various locations, has managed the Siervas de María hostel since 2006, with a total of 164 beds, and on the other hand, by the San Javier hostel, opened in 2003 and managed by the Vía de la Plata Cultural Association, offering 110 beds, and the Só Por Hoje hostel, opened in 2019, offering 10 beds. The Association of Friends received the Elías Valiña Award in 2007 from the Government of Galicia, recognizing its efforts in promoting the Jacobean routes.

=== Gastronomy ===
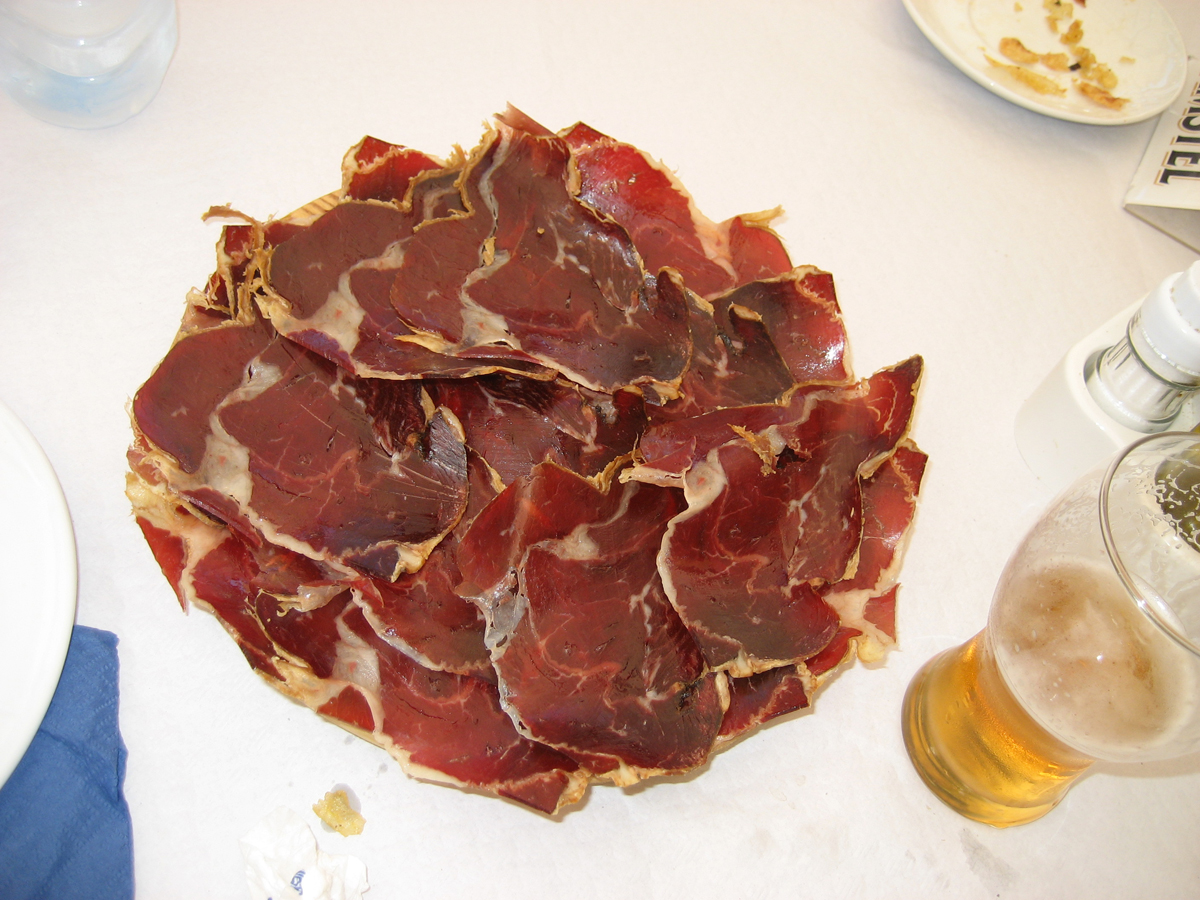
Plate of cecina de León

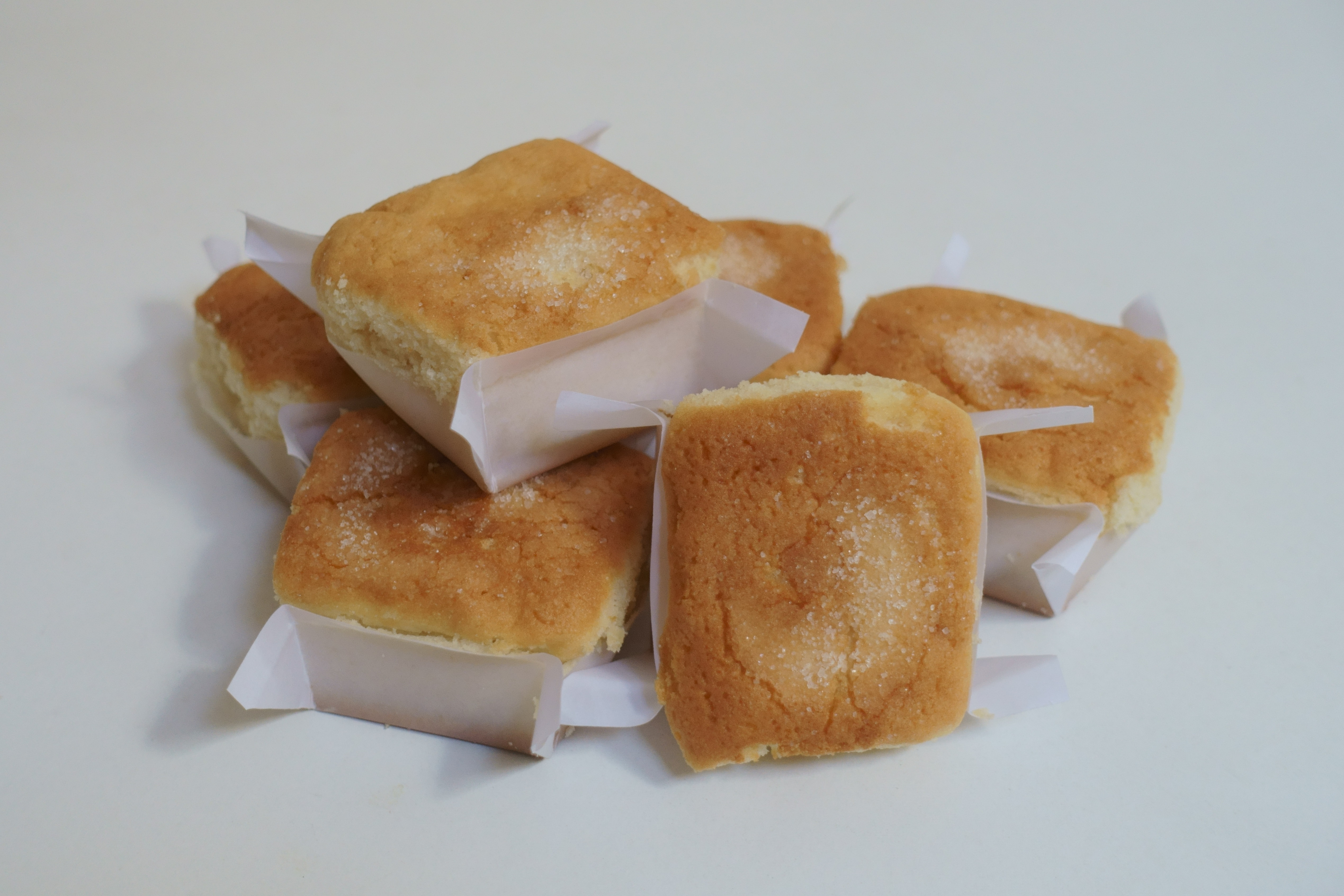
Mantecadas de Astorga

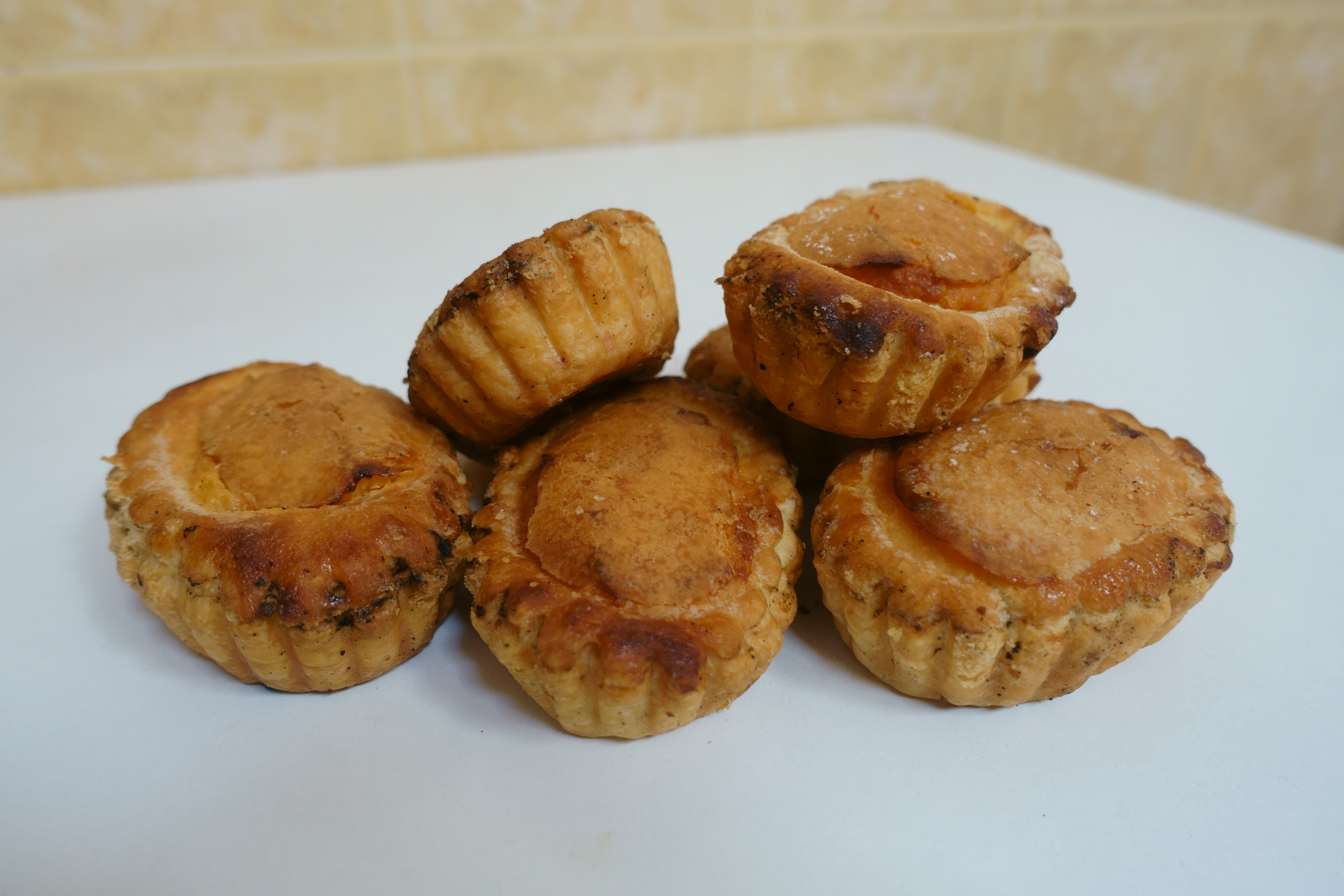
Merles de Astorga

Astorga's gastronomy is tied to the region's agriculture and livestock. The most famous dish is the Maragato stew, characterized by being served in reverse order, starting with the meats—which can include up to twelve types—followed by chickpeas, potatoes, and vegetables, then the soup, and ending with dessert, typically custard. The reason for this reversed order is not definitively known, but the custom seems to originate with the muleteers, who preferred to eat cold meat first and then heat the soup upon arriving in a town.

Other notable dishes include garlic soup, muleteer-style conger eel, sweetbreads in sauce, cabbage with cod, and cecina de León, a cured beef product that has held a Protected Geographical Indication since 1994, with its Regulatory Council based in Astorga. These culinary options, fundamental to the region's people, are preserved and promoted by the Gastronomic and Cultural Association "El Borrallo", whose cooking days culminate in the pig slaughter, yielding various products.

In terms of confectionery, sweets hold a prominent place in Astorga's cuisine. The most famous are the Mantecadas de Astorga, which have a Protected Geographical Indication. The first written mention of them dates to 1805, and their commercialization began in 1850; their origin is uncertain, though it is believed the recipe came from a nun at the Sancti Spiritus convent who left the order to marry and popularized it. Another sweet, also widespread in the province, is the Hojaldres de Astorga, puff pastries soaked in syrup, originating in the mid-20th century. Also notable are the merles, a puff pastry filled with cream and topped with caramelized sugar, and chocolate, present in Astorga since the mid-19th century, when the city had 41 chocolate factories in 1916, of which only four remain.

== Media ==
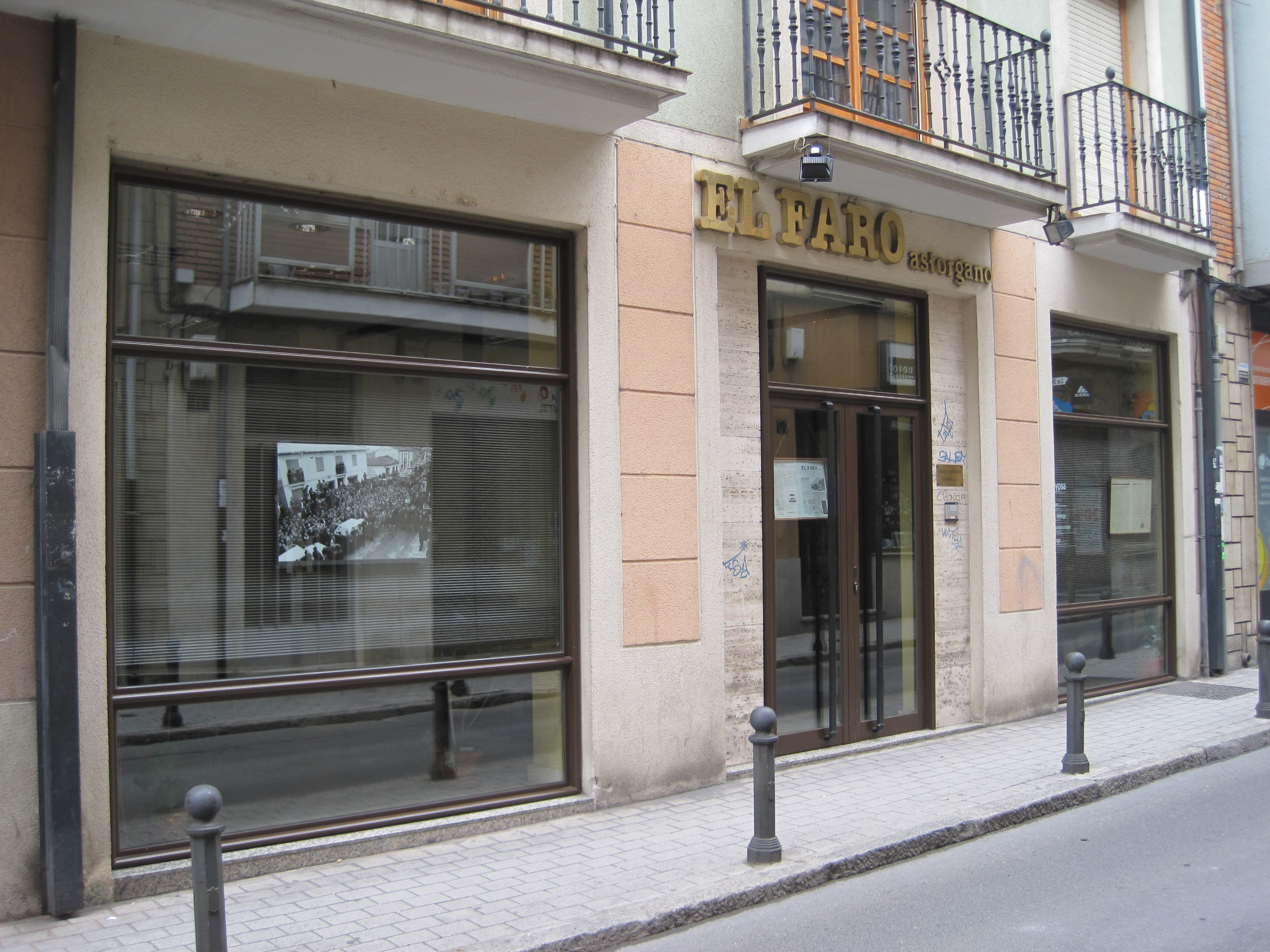
Headquarters of the newspaper El Faro Astorgano

Print media

Astorga's journalistic tradition dates back to 1852, when the first periodical, the Boletín Eclesiástico del Obispado, was published. By the end of the century, in 1885, the weekly Pedro Mato appeared, in 1892, the Catholic weekly La Luz de Astorga, and in 1899, El Heraldo Astorgano. In 1903, La Lid was published three times a week under the motto "freedom, progress, morality, and work", and El Faro Astorgano, a Catholic newspaper, was founded. The following year, El Pensamiento Astorgano began publication, in 1906, El Evangelio en Astorga, and in 1907, El Adalid. Later, in 1917, the weekly El Fresco was born, and in 1928, the weekly Humo began under the guidance of Ricardo Gullón, Leopoldo Panero, and Luis Alonso Luengo.

Of these, El Faro Astorgano is the most prominent, with regional, provincial, and autonomous reach, available in both print and digital editions. It is joined by the Cuadernos Municipales, dedicated to historical and artistic heritage, the magazine Catedral, by the Friends of the Cathedral association, the magazine Argutorio, by the Monte Irago cultural association, and publications by several Holy Week brotherhoods. Major national newspapers, as well as the provincial Diario de León and La Nueva Crónica, are also available.

Electronic media

In Astorga, listeners can tune in to national and regional radio stations, as well as local stations that broadcast programs dedicated to local news at different times of the day. Examples include COPE Astorga and Castilla y León Radio.

Regarding digital media, at the local and regional level, notable are the two websites of the City Council, offering significant institutional and tourist information, the digital version of El Faro Astorgano, the digital newspaper Astorga Redacción, founded in 2013, the digital newspaper Diario de Astorga, founded in 2014, and the portal Astorga.com.

== Sports ==
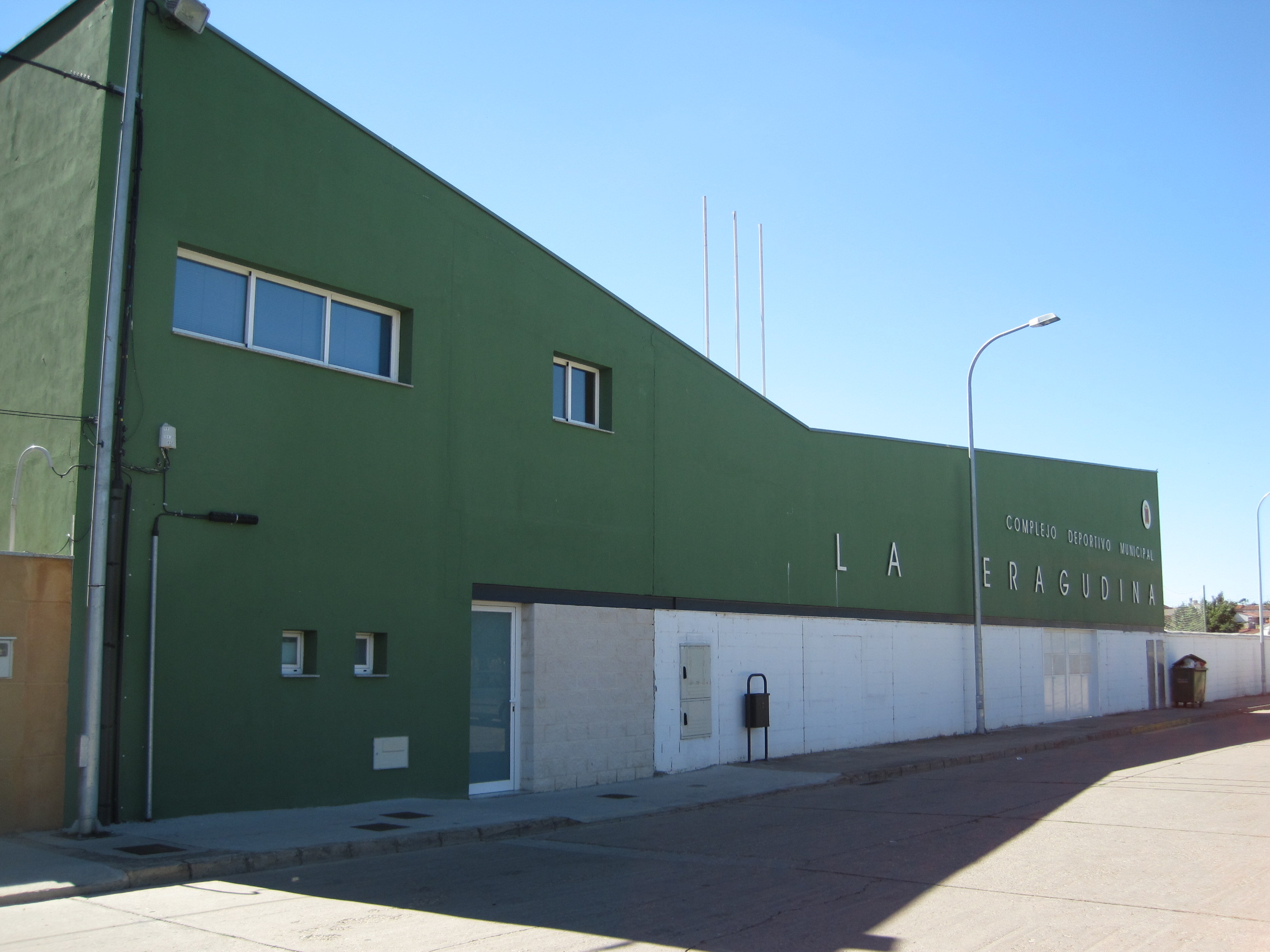
Facade of the La Eragudina sports complex, where Atlético Astorga plays its matches

Sports entities

The most important sports entity in the city is the Atlético Astorga Club de Fútbol, which competes in the Spanish Third Division. Futsal has a strong tradition in the city, which until 2001 was home to the Astorga Fútbol Sala team, which played in the First Division of the Spanish Futsal League from its founding in 1989 until 2001, when the club dissolved due to financial difficulties.

Other sports or activities practiced in Astorga include cycling, with the Astorga Cycling Club, slot car racing, with the Slot Club Astorga, motor sports with the Moto-Quad Senderos Maragatos sports club or the Astorga Motorcycle Sports Club, hiking with the La Salle sports club, and kung fu, at the school run by the Jiménez family, known for their displays of strength and endurance. Additionally, the City Council operates various municipal sports schools for athletics, basketball, futsal, Leonese wrestling, and swimming.

Sports events

Among the main sports events organized in the city are, on one hand, the Cycling Tour Against Drugs, which annually gathers several hundred participants for a route around Astorga, and on the other hand, local tournaments in various disciplines such as football, billiards, or tennis during the patronal festivals of Santa Marta at the end of August.

In 1947, 1967, and 2011, Astorga was a stage start or finish for the Vuelta a España, and it has also been a passage point several times for the Vuelta a Castilla y León and the Vuelta Ciclista a León.

Facilities

For sports practice, there are various facilities located mainly in the La Eragudina area: the football field "La Eragudina", where Atlético Astorga plays its matches, the Felipe Miñambres Municipal Sports Pavilion, municipal swimming pools, a gymnasium, several tennis courts, and two padel courts. Additionally, Astorga has a motocross circuit located in the El Sierro area.

== Twin towns ==
The city of Astorga participates in the city twinning initiative promoted, among other institutions, by the European Union. Through this initiative, ties have been established with the following cities:

Twin towns
Country	City	Twinning date
Spain	Reus	1988
(Western Sahara) Tindouf Refugee Camps	Aargub	1993
France	Moissac	1996
Spain	Clavijo	March 25, 2007
Spain	Mérida	2012

== See also ==
- Diocese of Astorga
- Marquess of Astorga
- Maragatería

== Bibliography ==
- Alonso Garrote, Santiago (2011) [1909]. El dialecto vulgar leonés hablado en Maragatería y Tierra de Astorga. Astorga. ISBN 978-84-9761-987-5.
- Alonso Gavela, María Jesús (1983). Gaudí en Astorga. Salamanca. ISBN 8430091718.
- Alonso González, Joaquín (2000). Astorga. Ciudad Bimilenaria. Ámbito. ISBN 84-8183-073-9.
- Alonso Luengo, Luis (1992). Los maragatos: su origen, su estirpe, sus modos. León: Lancia. ISBN 84-86205-75-1.
- Ares Alonso, Inocencio (1994). Gastronomía popular del país de maragatos. León: Ediciones Leonesas. ISBN 84-8012-071-1.
- Arias Martínez, Manuel; Llamazares, Fernando (1990). Astorga y Maragatería. León: Everest. ISBN 84-241-4965-3.
- Cabero Diéguez, Valentín (1973). Evolución y estructura urbana de Astorga. León: Instituto "Fray Bernardino de Sahagún" y Universidad de Salamanca, Departamento de Geografía. ISBN 84-00-03953-X.
- Cabero Domínguez, María Consolación (1995). Astorga y su territorio en la edad media (siglos IX-XIV). León: Universidad de Oviedo, Servicio de Publicaciones. ISBN 84-7719-523-4.
- Cavero Domínguez, Gregoria (1992). Las cofradías en Astorga durante la Edad Media. León: Universidad de León, Servicio de Publicaciones. ISBN 84-7719-299-5.
- García Marcos, Victorino; Vidal Encinas, Julio (1999). "Asturica Augusta: de asentamiento militar a urbs magnifica". Los orígenes de la ciudad en el Noroeste hispánico. Actas del Congreso Internacional 15-18 de mayo de 1996. Lugo: Diputación Provincial. ISBN 84-8192-136-X.
- Gómez Bajo, María del Carmen (1986). La guerra de la Independencia en Astorga, 1808-1814. León: Celarayn. ISBN 84-85378-63-6.
- Huidobro y Serna, Luciano (1950). Las peregrinaciones Jacobeas. Instituto de España.
- López García, José Luis (1991). Ayer y hoy del comercio y la industria en Astorga. Astorga: Cámara Oficial de Comercio e Industria. ISBN 84-606-0184-6.
- Mañanes Pérez, Tomás (1983). Astorga romana y su entorno. Valladolid: Universidad, Secretariado de Publicaciones. ISBN 84-86192-11-0.
- Martín Fuertes, José Antonio (1988). De la nobleza leonesa. El Marquesado de Astorga. La Robla: Hullera Vasco-Leonesa. ISBN 84-404-3592-4.
- Quintana Prieto, Augusto (1978). Los maragatos y su tierra. Astorga: Hullera Vasco-Leonesa. ISBN 84-300-0385-1.
- Quintana Prieto, Augusto (1993). Hospitales Astorganos. Beneficencia de la ciudad en la antigüedad. Astorga: Monte Casino.
- Rodríguez Díez, Matías (1981) [1909]. Historia de Astorga. León: Celarayn. ISBN 84-85378-25-3.
- Roldán Hervas, José Manuel; Caballero Casado, Carlos (2002). Itienera Hispana. Estudio de las vías romanas en Hispania a partir del Itinerario de Antonino, el Anónimo de Ravena y los Vasos de Vicarello. Madrid: El Nuevo Milenio. ISSN 1885-9534.
- Rubio Pérez, Laureano Manuel (1990). Astorga. Un enclave señorial en los siglos XVII y XVIII. León: Enrique M. Fidalgo.
- Serrano, Secundino (1991). Enciclopedia de León. Vol. I. León: La Crónica de León. ISBN 84-920557-4-X.
- Serrano, Secundino (1991). Enciclopedia de León. Vol. II. León: La Crónica de León. ISBN 84-920557-5-8.
- Serrano, Secundino; Álvarez Oblanca, Wenceslao (1991). Crónica Contemporánea de León. León: La Crónica de León. ISBN 9788487469084.
- Sevillano Fuertes, María Ángeles; Vidal Encinas, Julio (2002). Urbs Magnifica. Una aproximación a la Arqueología de Asturica Augusta (Astorga, León). Astorga: Ayuntamiento de Astorga. ISBN 84-89716-77-3.
- MPR I, Ministerio de la Presidencia, Relaciones con las Cortes y Memoria Democrática (2021). Estudio sobre la inmatriculación de bienes inmuebles de la iglesia católica en el registro de la propiedad desde el año 1998 en virtud de certificación del diocesano respectivo (I) (PDF). p. 1613.
