= Asturica Augusta =

Roman City

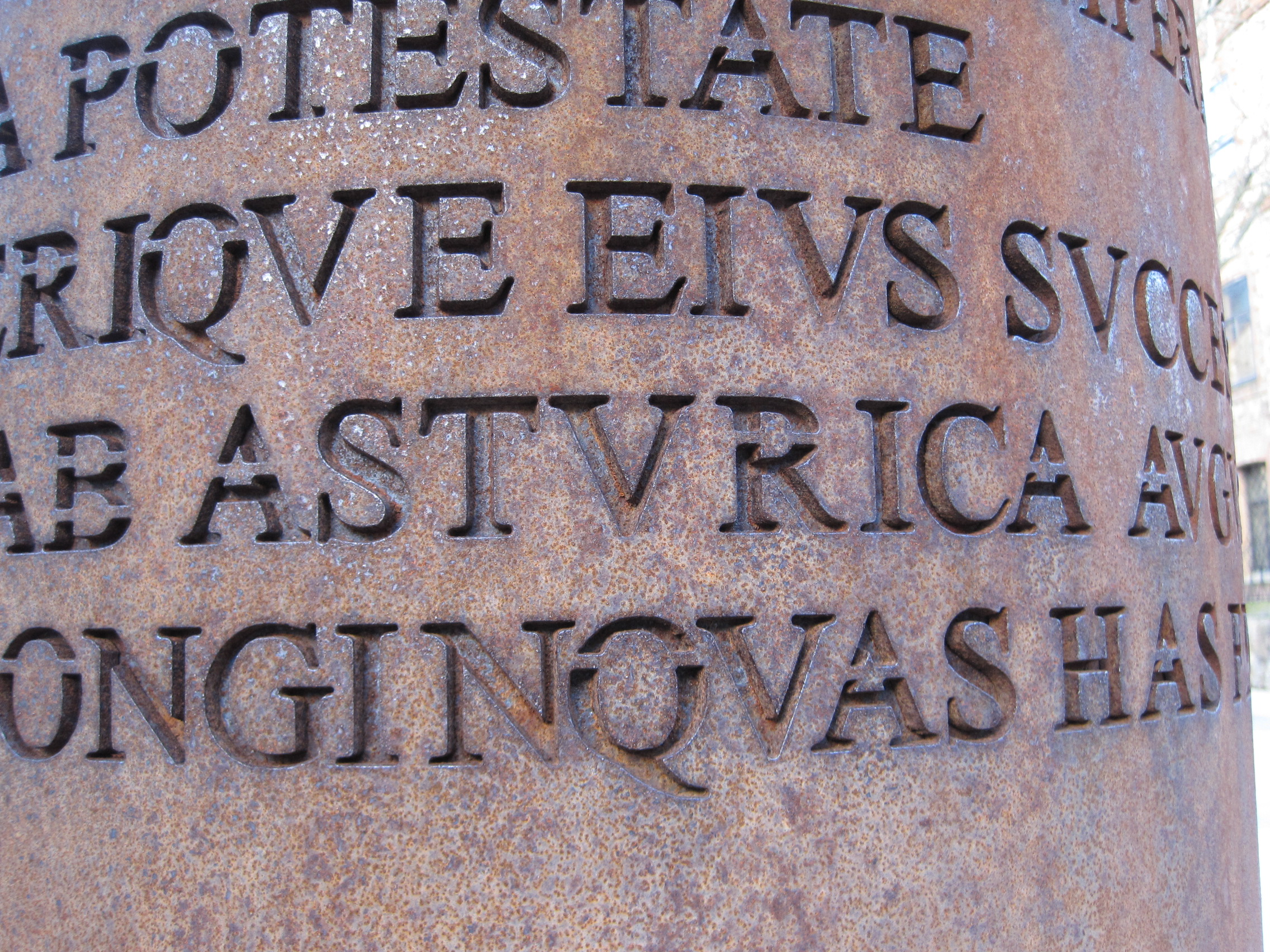

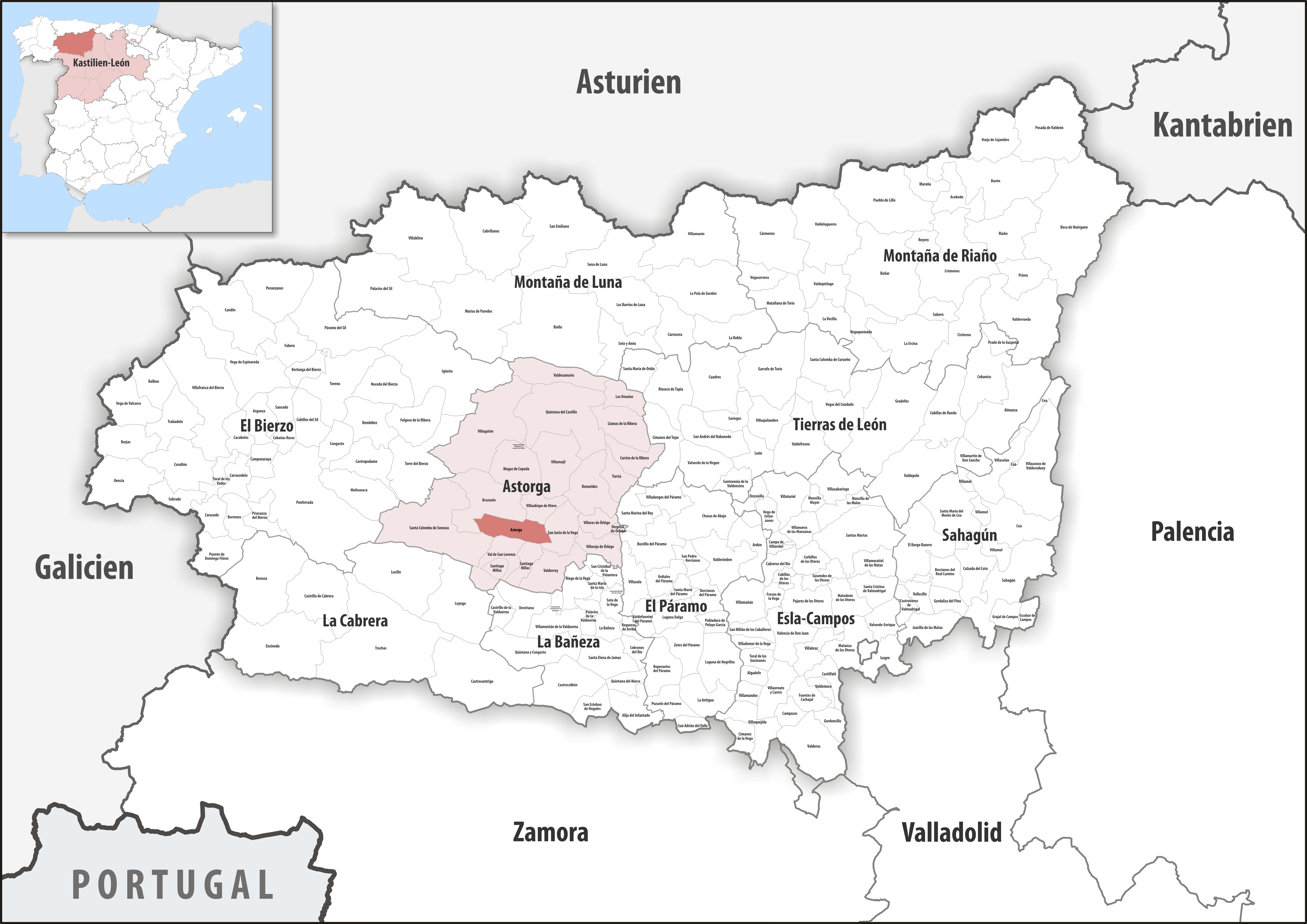
- 42°27′33″N 6°03′48″W
- Location: Spain
- Region: Country: Roman Empire Province: Tarraconensis (since 298, Gallaecia)

History
- Built: Around 14 B.C.

Designations
- Designation: Current equivalent: Astorga, Spain
- Military unit: Legio X Gemina, until the beginning of the 1st century.

Asturica Augusta was a Roman city corresponding to the Spanish city of Astorga, in the province of León. Founded around 14 BC as a camp of the Legio X Gemina, at the beginning of the first century it developed as a civil center and was the capital of the Asturicense conventus iurudicus, within the province of Tarraconense.

Located on a hill overlooking a large territory, from the mountains of León to the plains of the Páramo, during the first and second centuries it acquired great importance due to the control of gold mining in the northwest of the peninsula. It was an important communications hub, which, via numerous roads, linked the city with some of the most important centers of Roman Hispania.

Its ruins are hidden under the present city and among these are the Roman Ergastula, the two thermal complexes and the sewage system, as well as the domus of the Mosaic of the Bear and the Birds.

== Geography ==
The present-day municipality of Astorga is located in the northwestern part of the Duero river basin and its surroundings present, in general, a gentle relief but with two distinct areas: on the one hand a series of ESE-WEST oriented mountain ranges, with materials from the Lower Paleozoic, and on the other the plain of the Tuerto river, of Tertiary materials later covered during the Quaternary. Between both areas and at the confluence of the Jerga and Tuerto rivers, the city proper was located on a promontory, at 870 m (2,850 ft) above sea level, whose profile resembles a spur, becoming smoother at its western end.

It was located on the northwestern border of the Meseta; to the north is the Cantabrian mountain range, which divided the Asturians themselves into Transmontane and Augustan, to the east the alluvial countryside characteristic of the Duero basin, and to the west the mountains of León, with the summit of Teleno, which was the object of religious worship by both the Asturians and the Romans.

The fertile plains of the rivers allowed for agricultural use, especially that of the Tuerto, and the abundance of stone in the surrounding area—mainly quartzite—provided materials for construction. Likewise, the proximity to the gold deposits found in the surrounding mountainous area is another of the arguments put forward to justify its foundation; among them those of the Omaña river valley, the valleys of the Duerna and Eria rivers and the Bierzo, with the exploitation of Las Médulas.

== Literary and epigraphic sources ==
The city is mentioned on several occasions in classical historiography. Pliny the Elder, who visited the city in about 73, during the rule of Vespasian, notes the following:

Following them are the twenty-two peoples of the Asturians, divided into Augustans and Transmontans, with Asturica, a magnificent city: among them are the Gigurians, the Pesicans, the Lancians, and the Zoelas. The number of freemen in the whole population reaches two hundred and forty thousand.

— Pliny the Elder, Natural History, 3, 28

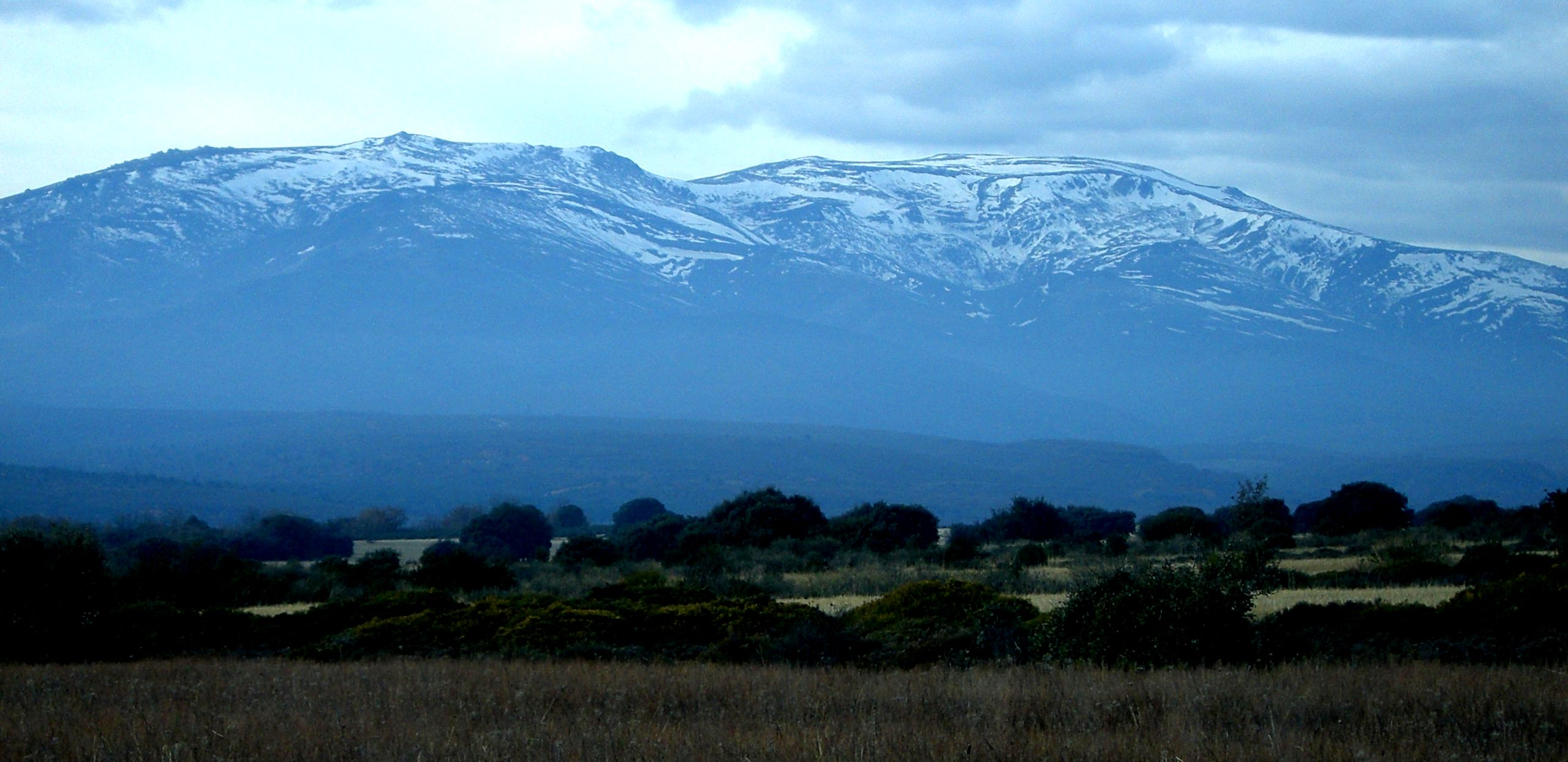
View of Mount Teleno

This qualification as magnificent may have been related to the growth it experienced as a result of gold mining during the first and second centuries. In the latter century, Claudius Ptolemy, in his work Geographia, includes Asturia as the capital of the Amachians. In the 3rd century, there are several mentions. Dion Cassius, who developed his work during the reign of Alexander Severus, points out the program of urban foundations carried out by Augustus. The Itinerary of Antoninus mentions it on several occasions as a mansio of the various Roman roads that converged in the city, while the Anonymous of Ravenna mentions it in one of his itineraries. The city is also mentioned by Bishop Cyprian of Carthage.

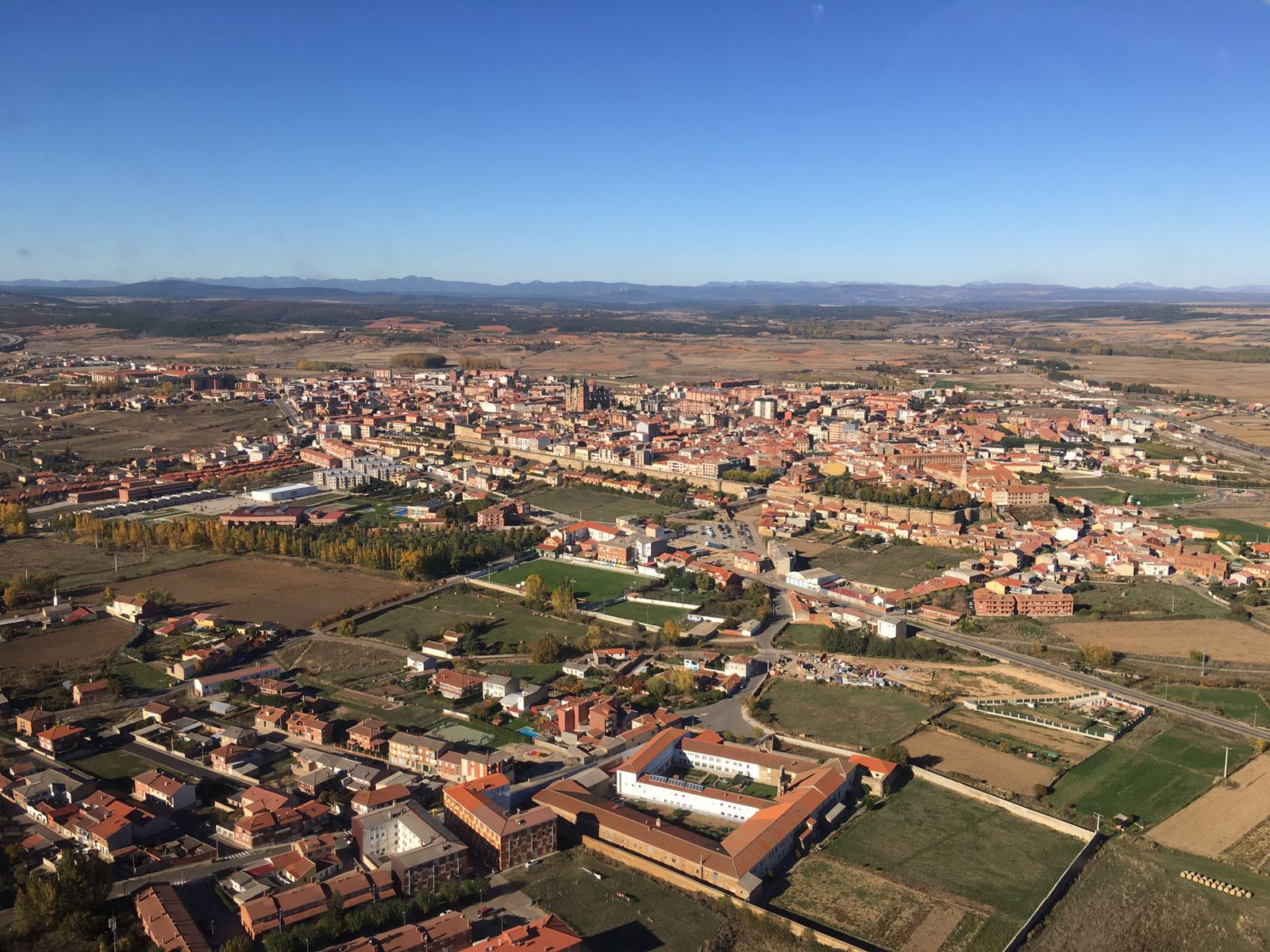
Aerial view of Astorga

Later we have mentions of Bishop Hydatius in the 5th century, Jordanes in the 6th century, and St. Isidore, who lived between the 6th and 7th centuries. Likewise, in the acts of several councils, such as those of Serdica, I of Saragossa, the Bracarenses III and IV, and Toletanus III, IV, VII, VIII, and X, different bishops of Asturica sign. As for epigraphy, 83 inscriptions from Astorga are known, to which should be added 21 found in the surrounding area and 7 from other parts of the Peninsula but related to the city or the Asturicense Convent. Most of them are of a funerary nature (64), followed in number by votive inscriptions (17). The oldest date back to the first century and allude to military themes, especially those related to the Legio X Gemina. The others belong to the 2nd and 3rd centuries; in them, among which two in Greek stand out, administrative and government positions are mentioned, such as Legati, Procuratores Augusti, procurator Asturiae et Gallaeciae, Augusti Dispensator and Praeses Provinciae.

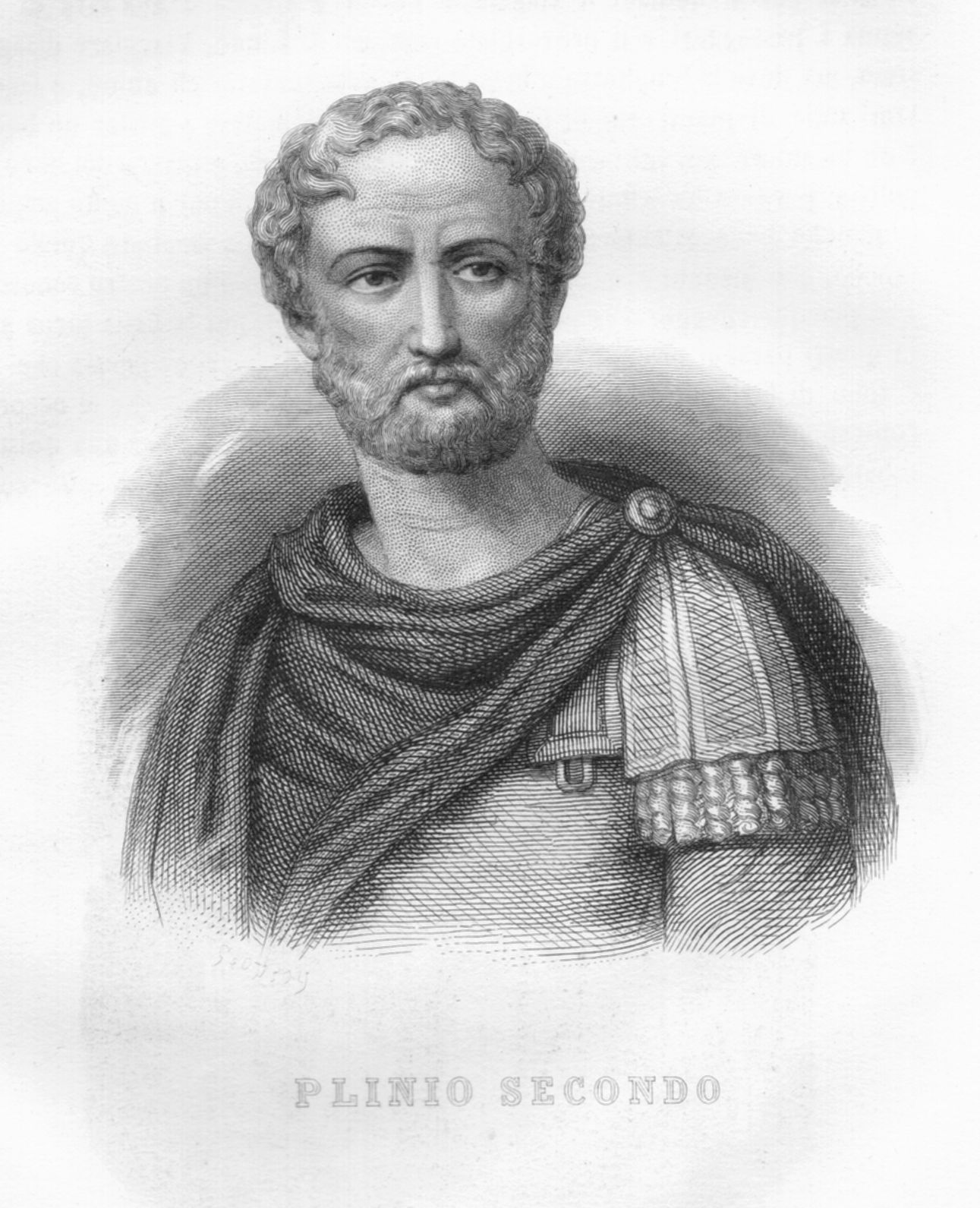
Pliny the Elder in an illustration from 1859

In relation to the possible municipal status of the city, reference is made to the positions of magistratus, curator, sacerdos, and flamines. The Tablet of Hospitality of Astorga or Pact of the Zoelas, ratified in Asturica in the year 152, also stands out, although the place where it was found is unknown. Some of the citizens mentioned are a grammaticus—a literate man—and an avium inspex—a fortune teller from the flight of birds. Likewise, the presence of an immigrant population, specifically of oriental origin, can be seen thanks to the inscription in Greek and their names, such as Lyda and Taumasto. Among those inscriptions that refer to cults and divinities, the cult of the emperor—as a form of recognition of Roman political power—the cult of the Capitoline triad and the cult of the goddess Fortuna stand out.

== History ==
=== Pre-Roman Asturica ===
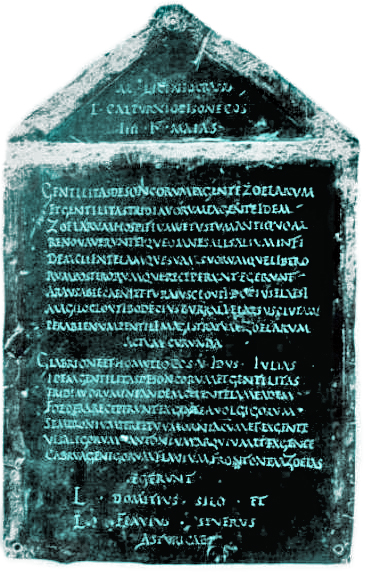
Astorga Tablet or Pact of the Zoelas, preserved in the Staatliche Museen in Berlin.

Due to the fact that the urban layout of present-day Astorga did not show orderly urban planning that would suggest a Roman origin, an indigenous origin for the city has traditionally been considered. The first to point this out was Manuel Gómez-Moreno in 1905, who endorsed its pre-Roman origin through the elevated position of the city. Later it was José María Luengo who tried to support this pre-Roman origin with archaeological finds; specifically, he pointed out, among others, a gold torque of unknown origin deposited in the National Archaeological Museum, two bronze ring fibulae, typically Roman, Iberian coins from private collections and a boulder with a hemispherical hole carved in it.

Another argument for its pre-Roman condition is its mention in one of the classical sources that refer to the city, the Geography of Claudius Ptolemy; in Book II he mentions Asturica as a city of the Asturians, specifically the capital of the Amachus, the only time they are mentioned in the classical sources. However, although there are reports of several Iron Age settlements around Astorga, the archaeological excavations carried out in the city have not provided evidence of pre-Roman occupation of the hill. Such hypotheses would have their origin in those ideological foundations, fashionable in the 19th century and part of the 20th century, that sought a Celtic origin for the city.

=== The arrival of Rome ===
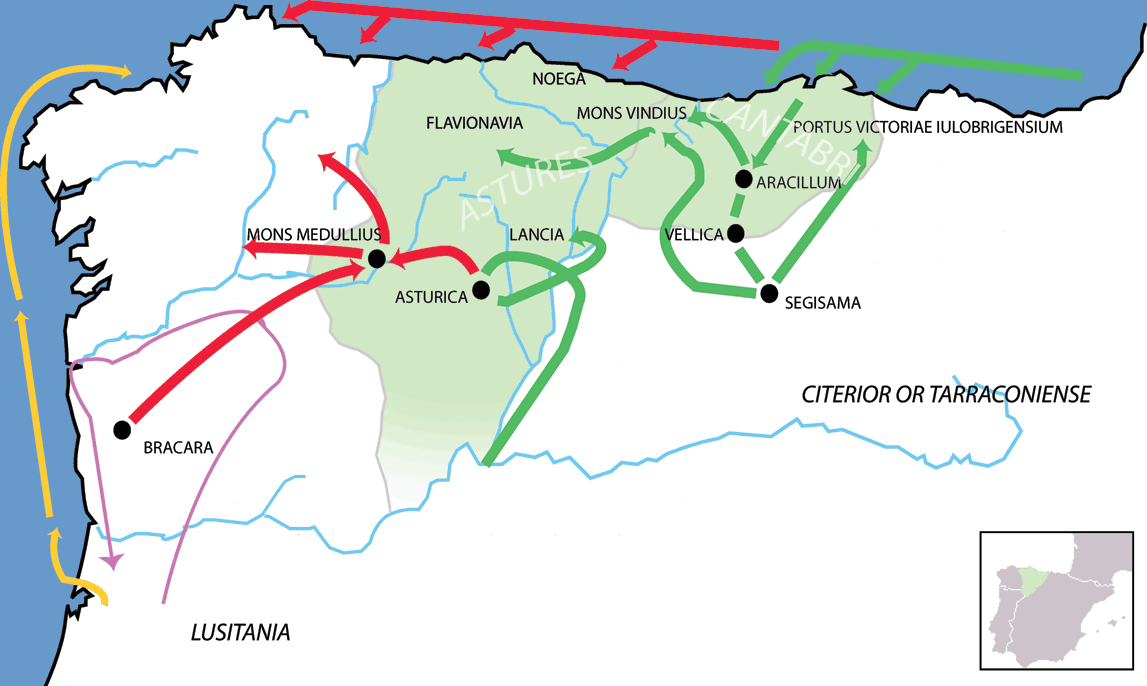
Roman military operations carried out during the Cantabrian wars. * Campaign of 25 BC (red) * Campaign of 26 BC (green) * Julius Caesar's campaign of 61 BC. (yellow) * Decimus Junius Brutus campaign of 137 BC. (pink)

The first contact of Rome with the northwest peninsular took place in the 2nd century BC with the expedition of Decimus Junius Brutus Gallicus in 138. C., and in the first century BC with those of Publius Licinius Crassus and Julius Caesar. C. After the integration of the Vacceans and Celtiberians into the Republic, only the coastal strip at the foot of the Cantabrian, where the Cantabrians and Asturians were located, remained unconquered. At the end of the 1st century BC, the war episode took place, after which the whole northwest was subdued. This was part of Augustus' political program; after coming to power, he carried out a reform of the army, entrusting it with the protection of the borders, which were delimited through various campaigns, and in this context the action of Rome in the northwest peninsular took place. The conflict was described by various classical sources, such as Florus, Orosius, and Dion Cassius, and among its causes were strategic, the personal prestige of the emperor, and economic ones.

The first Roman intervention took place in 29 BC, led by Titus Statilius Taurus, which was followed by others in the following two years, until 26 when Augustus arrived in person. The military troops that participated belonged to the Legio I Augusta, II Augusta, IV Macedonica, V Alaudae, VI Victrix, IX Hispana, and X Gemina. In total, adding legionaries and auxiliary corps, there were about 77,000–80,000 men.

In 26 BC the Bellum Cantabricum began, with Segisamo as a base camp. In the eastern zone, the Romans followed the course of the Pisuerga and subdued Vellica (Monte Cildá); they continued towards the north, up to Aracillum and Mons Vindius, where the Cantabrians had taken refuge, and there they defeated them. In the western zone, under the orders of Publius Carisius, they took Lancia and later they went to the west, where the confrontation of Mons Medullius took place, which meant the defeat of the Asturians. Finally, in 19 BC Marcus Vipsanius Agrippa arrived, who together with Silio Nerva directed the last campaign of the war, after which the dominion of the whole northwest peninsular culminated.

=== Military origin ===
The city's foundation is linked to the territorial organization carried out by Augustus after the end of the Cantabrian Wars, who applied a set of administrative, political, and fiscal measures to consolidate Augustus after the end of the Cantabrian Wars, who applied a set of administrative, political, and fiscal measures with the aim of consolidating his power in the newly annexed territories. The first to point out its possible military origin was Manuel Gómez-Moreno at the beginning of the 20th century, who indicated Legio X Gemina as the detachment installed there. Later it was Adolf Schulten who placed Legio X in Asturica based on the reconstruction of the military actions against the Asturians, five epitaphs of soldiers of that legion, and a text by Floro that would refer to the demilitarization of the camp:

...he ordered them to dwell and reside in his camp, located in the plain, to hold their assemblies there and to adopt it as their capital.

Likewise, José María Luengo considered Legio X responsible for the city's foundation, in whose construction its soldiers would have participated. Francisco Javier Lomas also related the city to the legion based on Floro's text. For his part, R. F. J. Jones proposed a first camp of the legion in Asturica before being transferred to Caldas de Reyes, where two epigraphs linked to soldiers of the legion were found, and both Mauricio Pastor and Alain Tranoy pointed out the presence of the legion by the epigraphs alluding to its soldiers. Patrick Le Roux was of the opinion that the Astorga camp would belong to the period of wars, being moved to the Vidriales valley, Petavonium, after the end of the wars, and that the epigraphs of soldiers would refer to the detachment dedicated to the construction of the city. Finally, Tomás Mañanes also indicated the presence of Legio X in the epigraphs of the soldiers and a possible camp base in the urban planning of the present city.

This military origin has been confirmed by archaeology. In addition to the camp base in the current urbanism, in the northwestern area of the hill, two parallel moats were found, fossae fastigatae type, which would correspond to the defensive system of the legionary camp, and which present an analogy with similar findings excavated in the British and Germanic limes. Other findings that reveal this military origin are ceramic productions of Terra Sigillata Italica, coins, and metallic materials associated with military clothing. The size and depth of the ditches and the existence of wooden constructions seem to indicate that it was a camp not involved in the military actions of the wars, that is to say, it would be later than these. This would be corroborated by the chronology of the archaeological materials found, since they do not date from before 15–10 BC.

Therefore, on a strategic hill, on the border between the countryside of the Duero basin and the mountains of León, around 15–10 BC, a military garrison was installed whose mission was the surveillance and control of the newly conquered territory, still in the pacification phase. Its importance would be confirmed by its inclusion in the network of roads. The military unit that settled there was the Legio X Gemina, with a long history in Roman history. It participated in the Gallic War, being Julius Caesar's favorite legion, and in the invasion of Britannia but aligned against Augustus so it was disbanded. Once rebuilt, it fought in the Cantabrian Wars and remained in Hispania until 63 (with camps in Asturica and Petavonium). After five years in Carnuntum, in the Danubian Limes, in 68 it returned to Hispania, from where it left again in 70 for Arenacum and Noviomagus, in the Rhenish Limes, to, around 103, settle in Aquincum. Finally, in 107, it moved to Vindobona, where it remained until the end of the Empire.

=== Early empire: birth of the city ===
See also: Early Roman Empire

Its birth as a civil nucleus must be traced through the information provided by archaeology. Between 1990 and 1992 the Domus del Pavimento of Opus Signinum was excavated, in which the camp structures were replaced by civil ones at the end of the reign of Tiberius and the beginning of Claudius' reign. In addition, between 1993 and 1996 a site was excavated between Blanco de Cela and Río Eria streets, where evidence of the first urban fortification was found; the remains of the camp fortification, the first urban wall and a house were found superimposed. In them, the filling of the camp moat is also produced at the end of the reign of Tiberius, but especially under the rule of Claudius. Therefore it would not be in the time of Augustus but in the time of Tiberius that the civilian nucleus would have been founded. This pattern is repeated in the different excavations carried out, in which a military horizon is amortized for its later transformation into a civilian nucleus, something that possibly took place coinciding with the capital of the conventus and the exploitation of the mining resources of its territory.

In contrast to the theories that indicate that the northwest of the peninsula underwent a limited process of Romanization, there is evidence that shows the development of clearly Roman structures; the forum is an example of a public space typical of any Roman city, although designed in its own style. We would find ourselves before a center of state, administrative and fiscal machinery, which would exceed the local level. Likewise, a plaque with an inscription dedicated to Mars Tilenus proves another of the most characteristic elements of Romanization, that is, the assimilation of an indigenous god to another of the Roman pantheon.

=== Late empire: the end of Roman rule ===
With the territorial reorganization that took place in the 3rd century, the city became part of the province of Gallaecia, with its capital at Bracara Augusta. A new wall was also built, with a perimeter of two kilometers, remains of which are still visible in the so-called Roman Gate, but with the end of mining operations in the time of Diocletian the city began to decline.

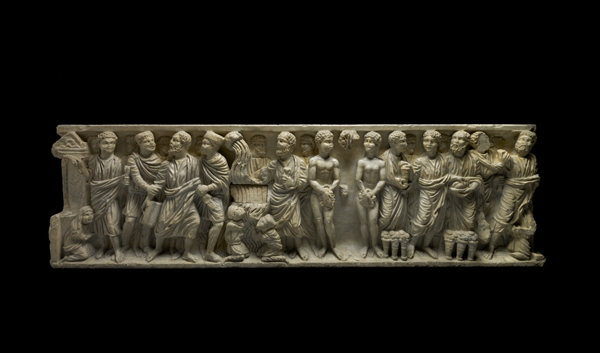
Sarcophagus of Astorga

Apart from the legend that attributes to St James the Apostle the preaching in these lands and the foundation of the bishopric, the discovery in the vicinity of Astorga of one of the oldest Roman-Christian sarcophagi in the peninsula indicates the presence of an early Christian movement. In the middle years of the 3rd century, it must have been established as an episcopal see, with Basilides being its first bishop, around 249. This fact is mentioned by Cyprian of Carthage, who points out that in 253–254 Christian communities had been established in Zaragoza, Mérida, Leon, and Astorga. All this, together with the presence of Bishop Decentius at the Council of Elvira in 300, confirms the incipient presence and organization of a Christian community at an early date. However, the establishment of Christianity was threatened by the barbarian invasions and, in the religious field, by the expansion of the Priscillianist and Manichaeist doctrines, against which Hydatius or Saint Toribius later fought after the condemnation made at the Council of Saragossa in 380. After the execution of Priscillian in Trier in 385, Bishop Symposium converted to Catholicism, as did his successors Dictinus and Comasius; a Priscillianist stronghold had been organized around them in Astorga in the second half of the 4th century.

After the barbarian invasions, the establishment of the Suevi in the territory of the ancient Gallaecia around 410 put an end to the Roman domination over the city, suffering the first destructions or looting by the Suevi Hermeric.

== History of archaeological research ==
The first signs of interest in researching the city's past came after the discovery of a series of Roman inscriptions. The epigraphic collection of Asturica began when the City Council, around the 1830s, agreed to the creation of a public garden in one of the corners of the walled enclosure, the Garden of the Synagogue. All the inscriptions deposited in the Town Hall were placed on both sides of the access gates. They remained there from 1840 until 1901, when they were moved back to the municipal offices. Therefore, the first publications were epigraphic in nature, with studies by Emil Hübner, Fidel Fita and Marcelo Macías.

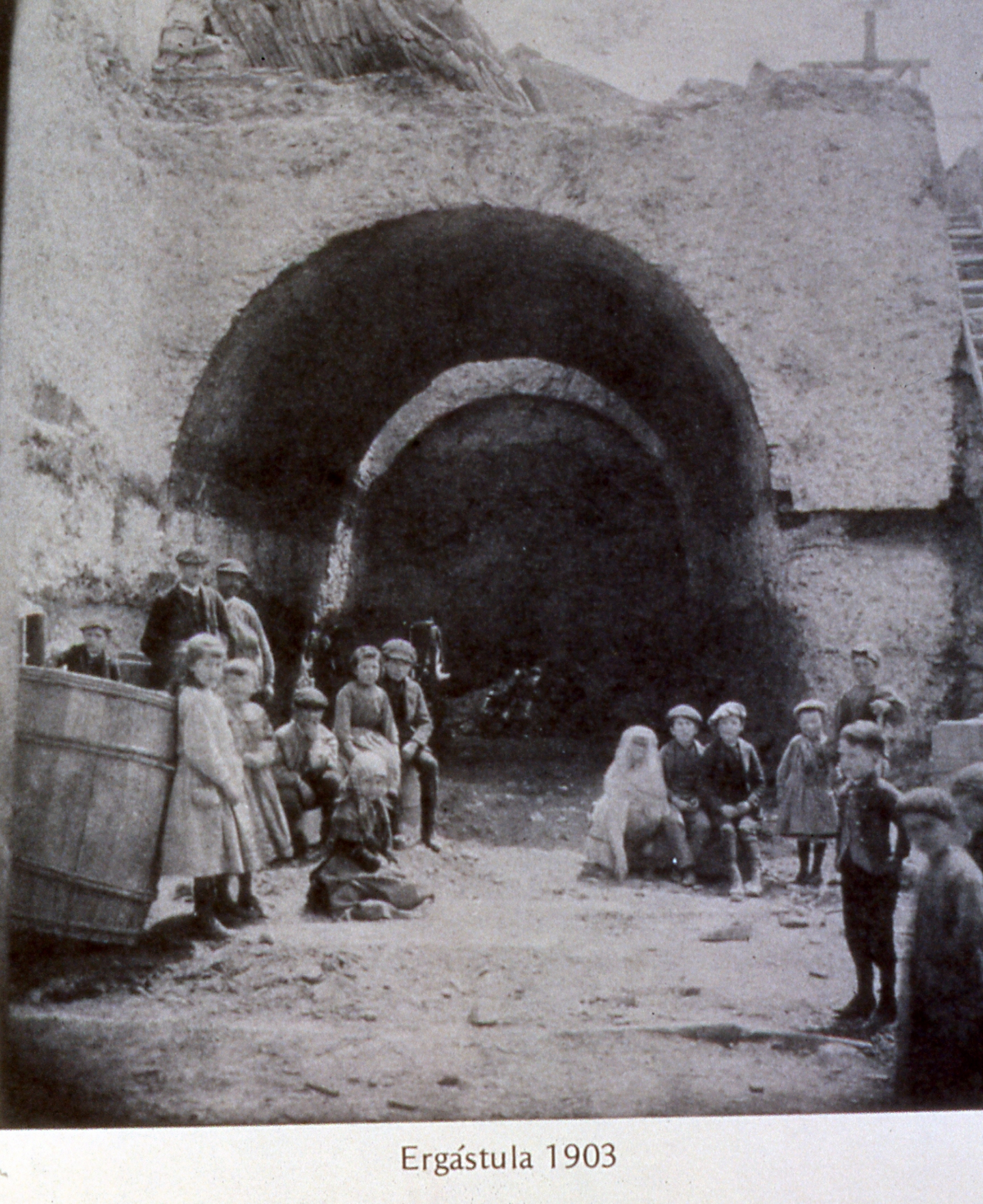
Ergastula in 1903

In 1863, several of the Roman sewer galleries were found and put back into use. The historian Matías Rodríguez also reported a discovery in 1896 in García Prieto Street (formerly La Redecilla), where the master builder of the City Hall had the opportunity to make a plan of an ancient street paved with slabs, identified as Roman because it was associated with structures of that time. It was not until 1946 that José María Luengo carried out a study of the sewer located in the Garden of the Synagogue. The same author continued to carry out archaeological interventions in Astorga, within the Annual Plan of the Ministry of Culture, being the first ones carried out officially. When the results were published in 1961, Luengo took the opportunity to report various findings in several places in the urban area.

Subsequently, Tomás Mañanes carried out some excavations, among which those carried out in the section of the wall next to the Episcopal Palace stand out, where, in 1971 and 1972, he identified the only known Roman door of the city, and in the so-called Termas Mayores in 1984, of which he was the discoverer.

Since 1984, with the transfer of competencies to the Junta de Castilla y León, the archaeological excavations in Astorga suffered a strong impulse: from that moment on, any site located within the walled enclosure is excavated before the construction of a new building. In 2002, more than 100 plots were studied, giving rise to important data concerning the chronology and characteristics of the Roman city and its evolution during the first centuries of our era.

These studies, in addition to their purely scientific interest, have given rise to conservation work in situ of some of the findings, forming part of one of the tourist attractions of the city, the so-called Roman Route. In May 2005, work began on its museumization, and it was reopened in the summer of 2009.

== Archaeological remains ==
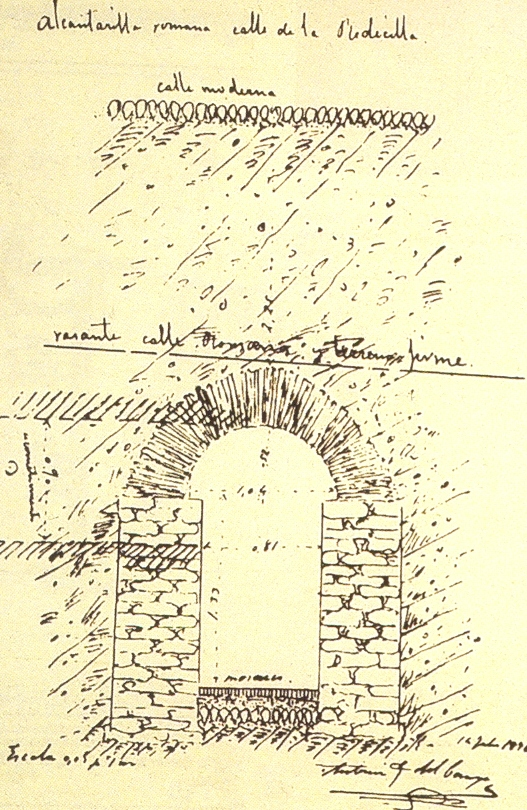
Section made by A. G. del Campo in 1896

The plan of the city shows a space of 26 hectares of extension, limited by a wall of 2200 in length. The shape of such an enclosure is not completely rectangular due to a narrowing of the hill in its southern corner, forming the wall in that part a triangular shape. This may be the cause of the different disposition of the urban road, differentiating two zones: on the one hand, a rectangle of 430 by 380 meters is observed, with grid planning, giving rise to square or rectangular blocks. The other end, the southern one, is organized in relation to its eastern boundary, with streets parallel to it, including the Forum itself, which occupies a large area of that zone.

=== Sewer ===
Such an interesting find was immediately put to use, and today the population has a service that would never have been provided if chance had not come across it.

— Historia de Astorga. León

In 1863 the Roman sewage system was found by chance; specifically it was a collector located between the Plaza de San Julián and Manuel Gullón Street, which on its opposite side poured its waters into the Jerga River. In 1867 another branch was discovered under García Prieto Street (formerly La Redecilla) which flowed into Puerta de Rey. At the end of the century, in 1896, the master builder A. G. del Campo recorded the existence of a paved street associated with a sewer in what would be the first documents relating archaeological discoveries of Roman Astorga.

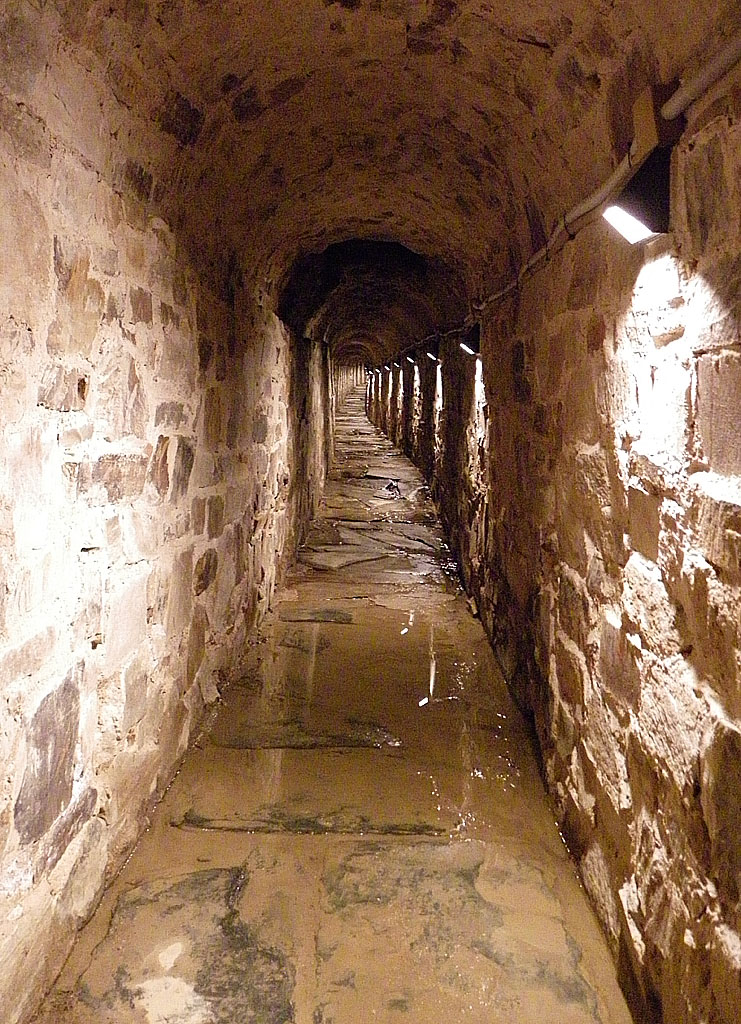
One of the sewers in its current state

It described a construction of masonry walls 1.10 meters high up to the fascia line and 0.60 meters thick. The width of the collector was 0.90 meters and the height of the gallery was 1.50 meters. On the walls, there was a semicircular vault and a concrete slab about 20 cm (8 in) thick. At the beginning of the 20th century, two more branches were discovered under Pío Gullón and Santiago streets. In 1946 José María Luego investigated the sewer section under the garden of the Synagogue and, based on the constructive differences between the different branches, established two different chronologies for its sewer network. Roman cities of ancient construction sometimes lacked a sewage network; however, in newly founded cities after the conquest, as in this case, the sanitary infrastructure was part of the urban planning. Therefore, Asturica Augusta had a network of sewers to evacuate dirty water from both domestic use and public buildings such as baths. Their layout coincides with that of the streets, making them important for reconstructing the urban plan. They are in a very good state of preservation so many of the sections are used for the sanitation of the modern city.

The constructive modality of the different branches is not uniform since in their enclosure it is possible to observe both a semicircular vault and a linteled roof. In some cases the linteled sections are replaced by collectors with vaulted roofs, which would indicate that the flat roof is chronologically earlier: it would represent two different urban phases, one Julio-Claudian and the other Flavian.

=== Thermal complexes ===
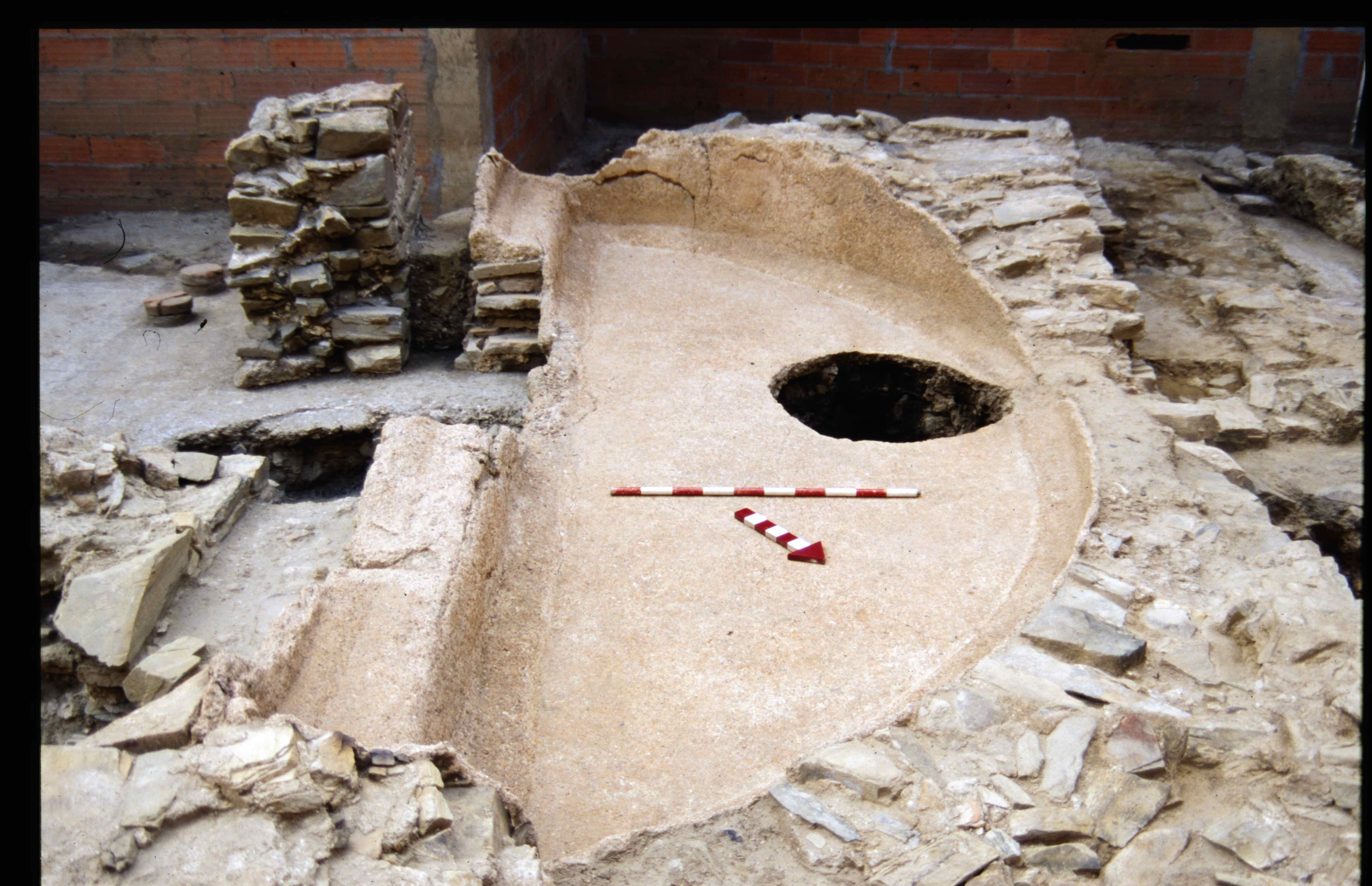
Bathtub of the Major Baths

The public baths, in addition to being places for personal hygiene and care, served as a center for social relations and occupied an important place in the organization and enjoyment of leisure. As in most Roman cities, Asturica Augusta had facilities of this type, of which two public complexes are currently known as Termas Mayores (Major baths) and Termas Menores (Minor baths).

In August 1984, the remains of what would be called the Termas Mayores were found. They were located in the central area of the city, next to the intersection of the two main roads. Two construction periods have been documented: a first phase, between the middle of the first century and the middle of the third century, and a second phase, from the fifth century, after undergoing a major remodeling.

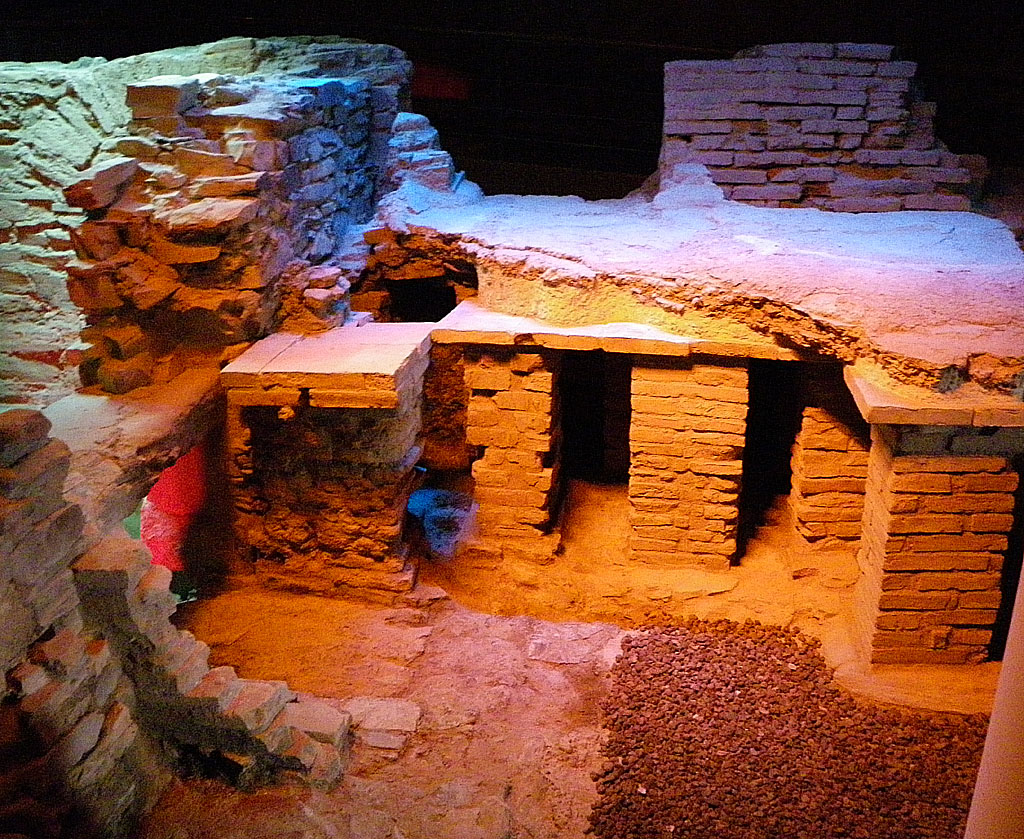
Remains of a hypocaust of the Minor Thermal Baths

The accesses were made through its southern and northern limits; the first through a square construction, possibly vestibulum, and the second was verified thanks to the location of the apodyterium. A large frigidarium has been documented, annexed to four other spaces: three of them with hypocaustum, cella tepidaria and two circular sudatoria, and a fourth, interpreted as apodyterium. The Termas Menores—discovered in the early 1980s on a site on Padre Blanco Street—is located in the southeastern part of the city. Chronologically, three phases can be distinguished: the first in the middle of the first century, the second at the end of the first or beginning of the second century, and the third in the middle of the second century, when it underwent a major restructuring of the spaces.

They are in a good state of preservation: frigidarium, tepidarium, sudatorium and two caldaria, as well as the service rooms such as those used for the furnaces or praefurnia.

=== Forum ===
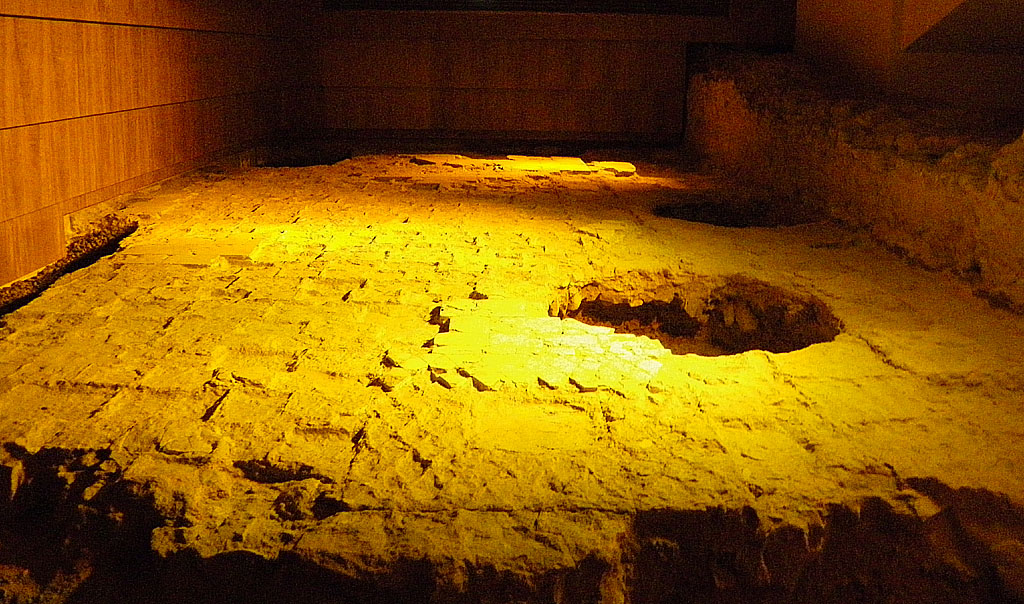
Remains of the Aedes Augusti

The forum is the most prominent public space in any Roman city and concentrated religious, political and economic activities. Therefore, it was the image that best projected the sense of Romanization, especially in cities located in newly conquered territory. Asturica Augusta is located in an elevated area, at the southern end of the hill where the city is located, and coincides in part with the current Plaza Mayor. The complex would extend over an area of more than 31,000 meters2 and the buildings, in this area of the city, would follow a north–south axis, unlike the northern area, where they follow a northwest–southeast axis.

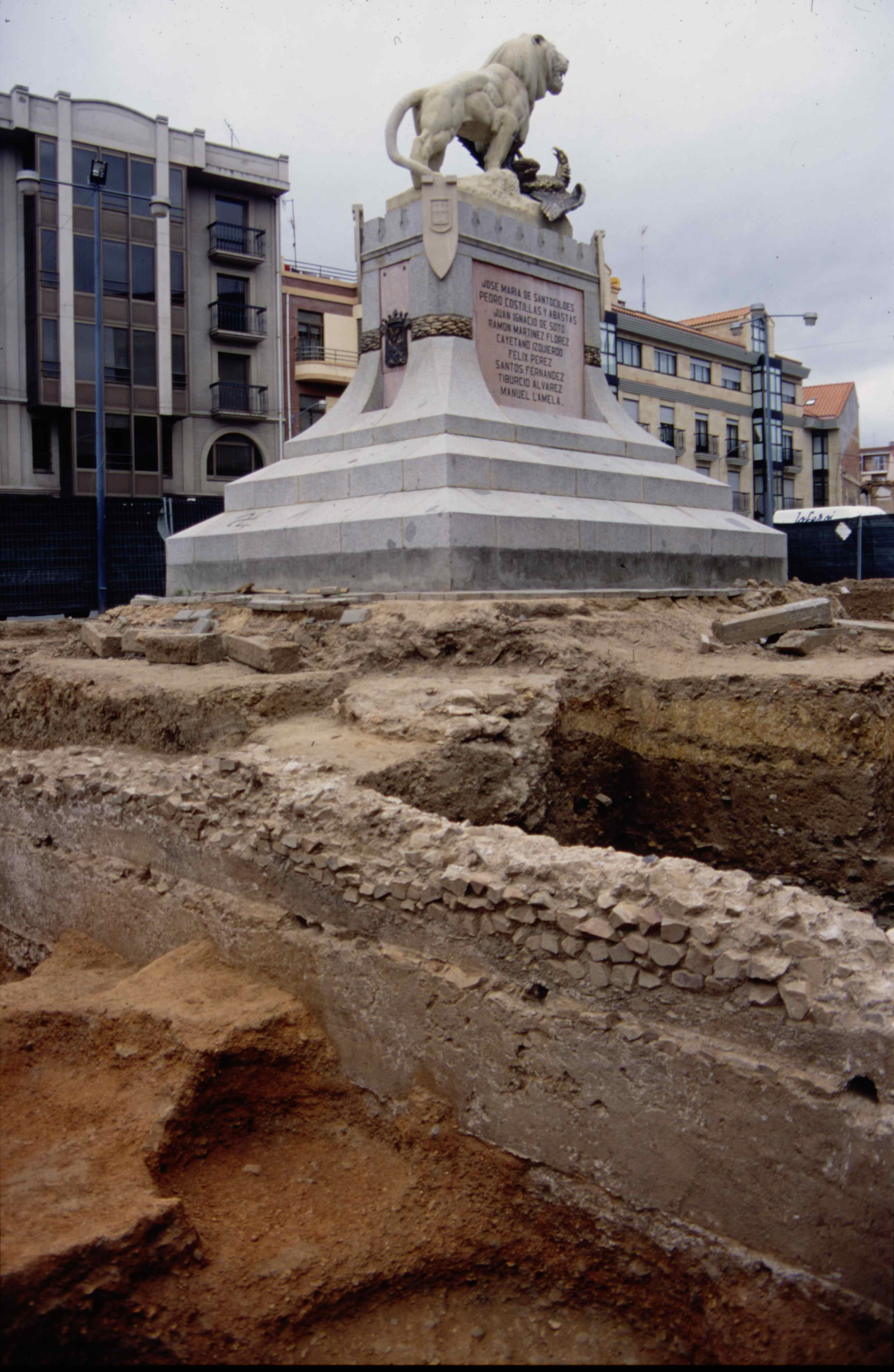
Forum enclosure wall on its northern flank

The closing of this space repeats the same scheme, as has been found in the different excavations carried out, for example, the site of the Old Hospice, Santocildes Square, Alonso Luengo Street; it has a double portico in which semicircular apses and rectangular exedras open, whose base uses the same construction technique, the opus caementicium. On the western limit, and in an axial position, there is a rectangular room with a semicircular head, which is accessed through an entrance presided by two columns in antis, and whose pavement is made of opus sectile, with a geometric design. Traditionally, this space has been considered an Aedes Augusti, for the official ceremonies of imperial worship, but later interpretations suggest that it may have been used as the seat of the curia. In the central area of the forum is the structure known as the Roman Ergastula. It is a gallery covered with a barrel vault and built-in opus caementicium. Its length is 50 meters, its width is 5.30 meters and its average height is also 5.30 meters. Its plan would be U-shaped, being the existing structure at its eastern closure, since from its ends depart foundations in the direction of the current Plaza Mayor. This gallery would be the substructure of a building, perhaps an Ara Augusta, an altar dedicated to the emperor. This whole complex may not have been conceived as a forum since, on the one hand, it occupies an area much larger than the average of the Hispano-Roman cities (11.6% compared to an average of no more than 2%), and on the other hand it seems that some structures were already there before the planning of the city, i.e. its construction may have been contemporary to the camp period, during the presence of the Legion X Gemina. Proof of this could be the sandstone ashlars with the inscription LXG that were used in the construction of a building next to the northeastern portico.

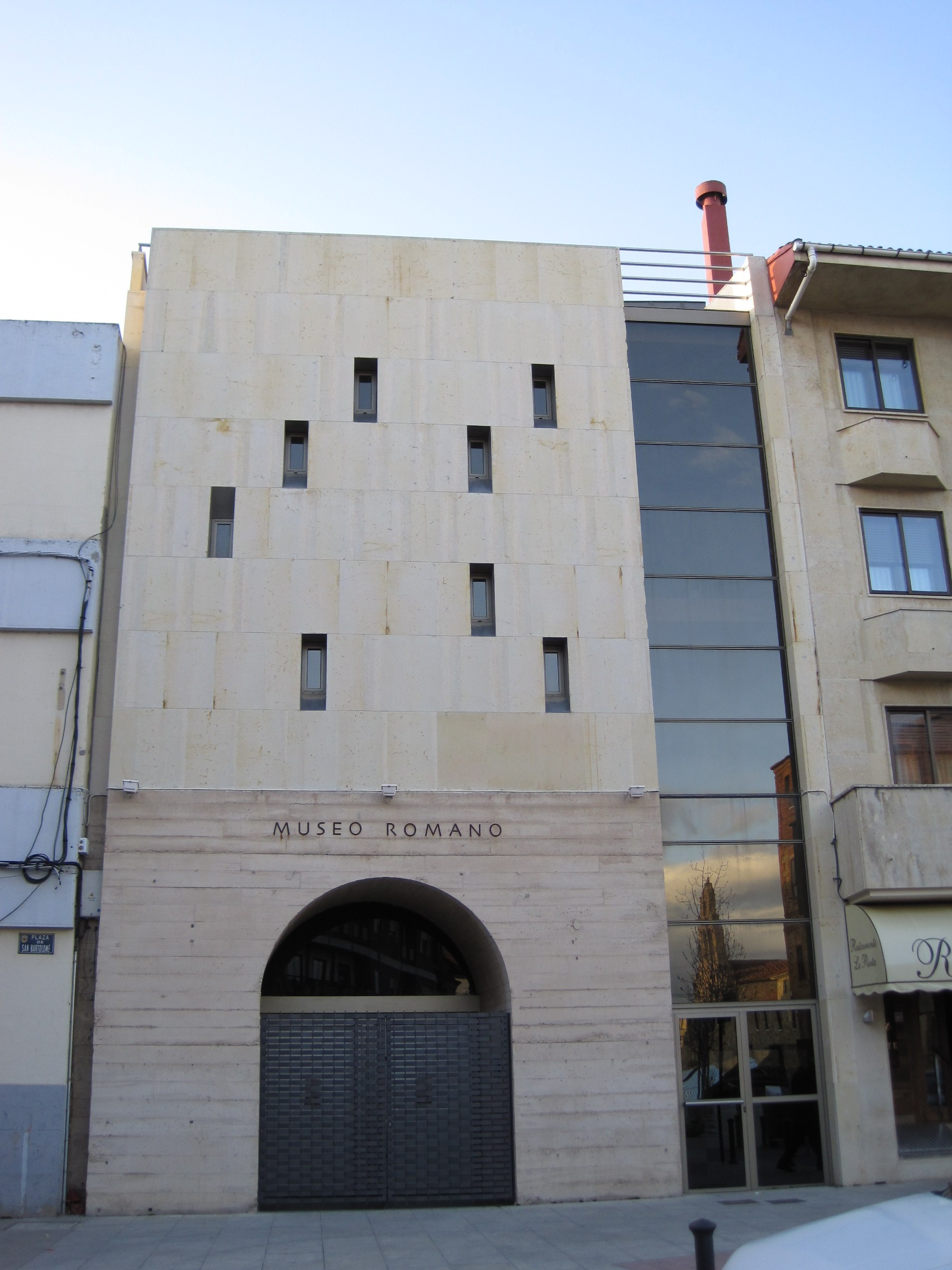
Facade of the Roman Museum, erected on the ergastula

On the other hand, the archaeological work carried out on the occasion of the rehabilitation of the Gullón Theater made it possible to document, at the eastern end of the forum, the remains of the basilica: a semicircular apse, with four buttresses on the outside, and at its opening two columns in antis, all in opus caementicium. In another nearby plot, in the Plaza Arquitecto Gaudí, two parallel walls and a foundation cube of an opilar column were found, which would belong to the eastern flank of the building.

=== Wall ===
The archaeological works that have been carried out have provided information about the different defensive enclosures that were built in Roman times. The first would correspond to the fence or vallum built by the legionaries of the Legion X Gemina, of which the moats that were built at its feet have been found, whose purpose was to increase its defensive potential.

The second fence was a stone wall built once the settlement ceased to have a military character, giving way to a civilian settlement. There is only evidence of this wall in a plot of the city; it was 2.5 meters wide and had circular cubes at intervals, one of them 5 meters in diameter. It was demolished, at least in part, in the third quarter of the first century, at which time a house occupied its space. Its construction would have taken place between the reigns of Tiberius and Claudius, which coincides with the first evidence of civil architecture in the city.

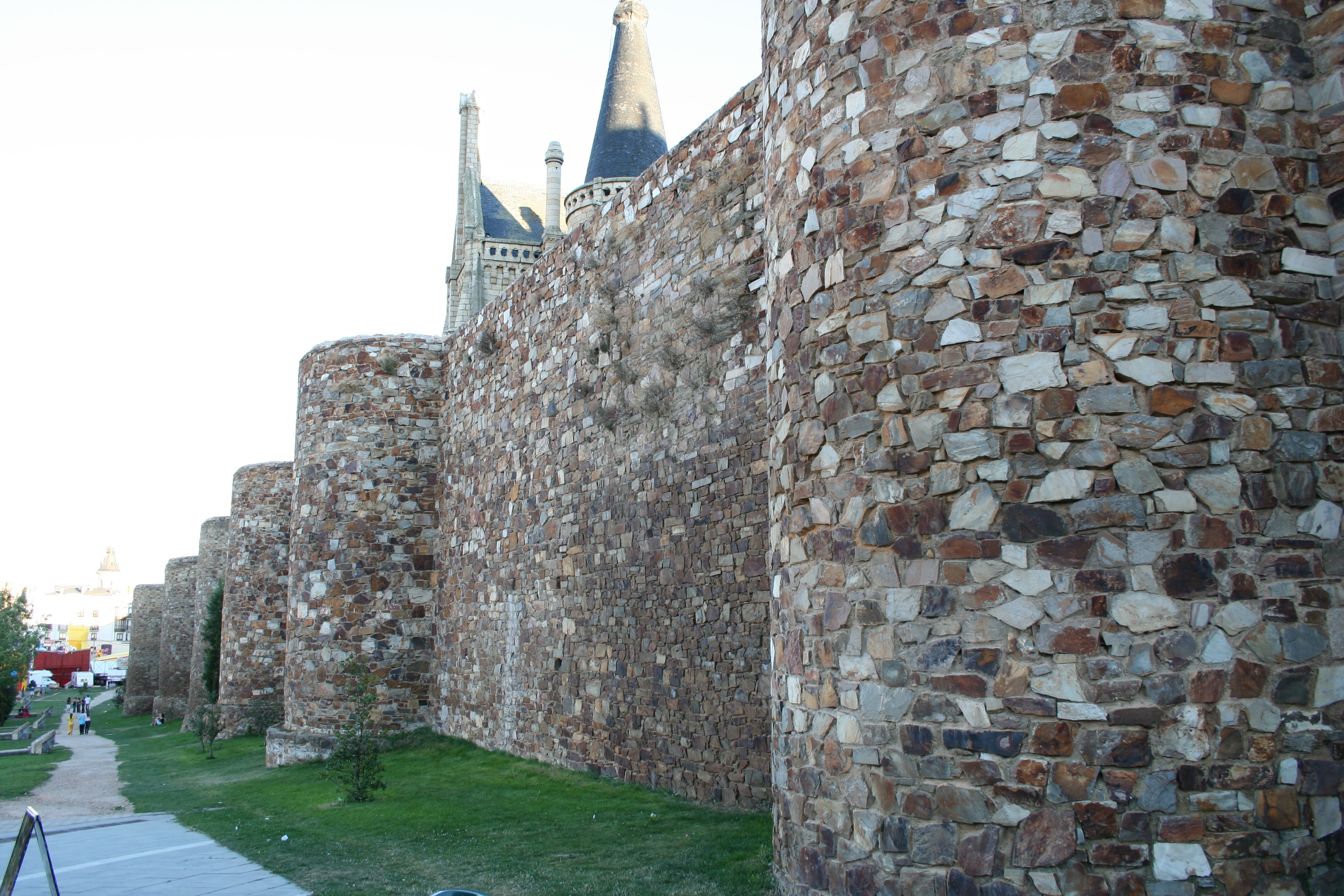
View of the wall

Political instability in the lower imperial period provoked a process of fortification of urban centers, especially intense in the northwest of the peninsula, although widespread in those located along the most important communication routes. Although there are different hypotheses, the current thesis defends a chronology for this third fence between the end of the third century and the beginning of the fourth, a time when the crisis of the third century was overcome and economic recovery took place. In the history of this wall, it is worth mentioning the repairs carried out in the 13th century by Bishop Nuño, which may have significantly transformed the appearance of the fortification, and the destruction caused by the Sieges of Astorga during the War of Independence.

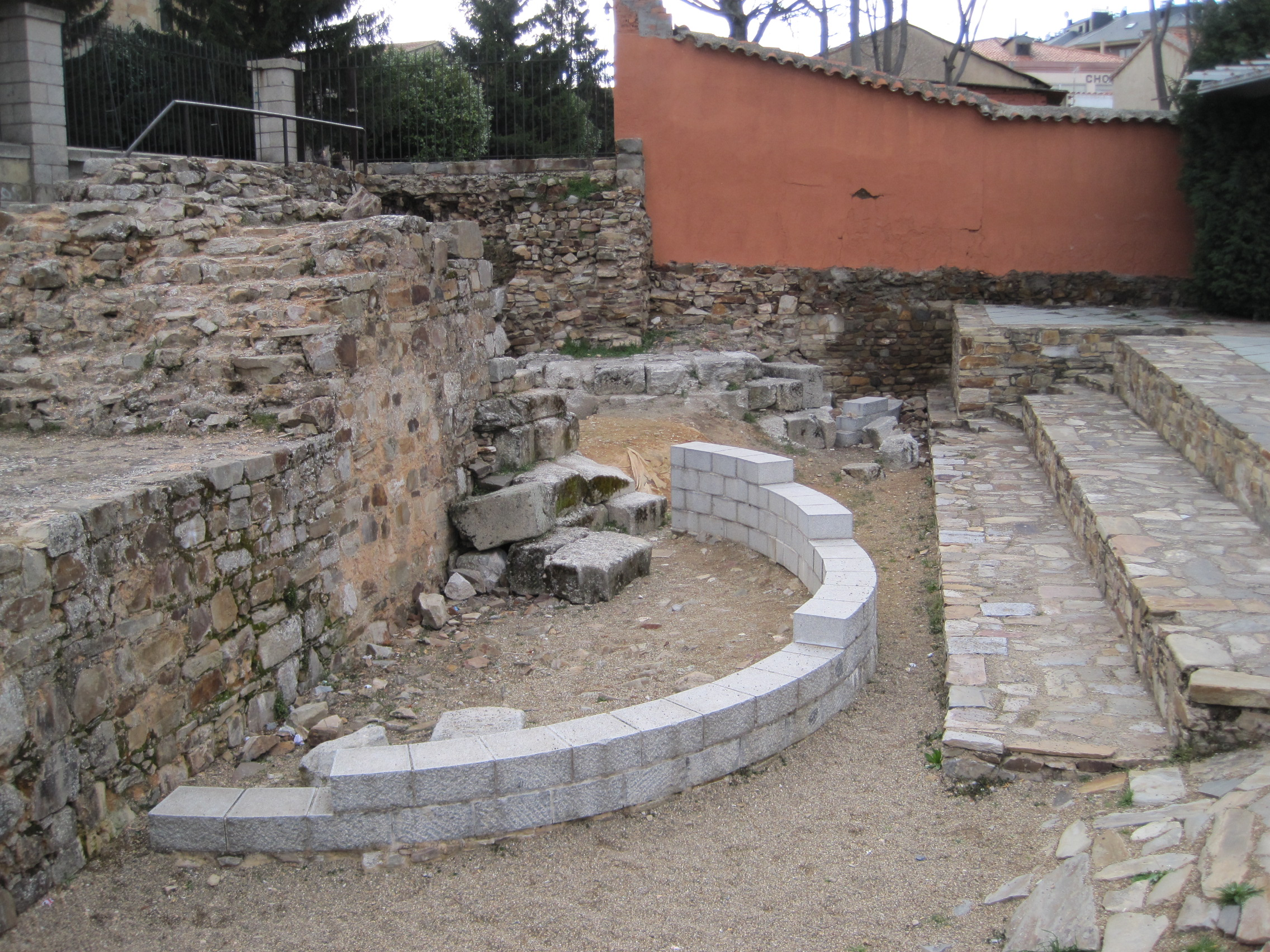
Partially reconstructed remains of the only known Roman gate

Its structure has two exterior walls that function as formwork for a core built with quartzite blocks mixed with mortar. In the exterior walls, irregular quartzite blocks were used, being substituted in some prestigious places by granite ashlars. Its layout is conditioned by the topography of the hill, with an irregular trapezoidal floor plan. Its current state of conservation is poor due to the repairs and restorations it has undergone, and what can be seen is the result of the 20th-century works that hid the original walls. The original layout of the towers has also been modified. Of all the accesses it had, the only one documented from the Roman period is the one located at what is traditionally known as the Iron Gate. It was excavated in the 1970s and re-excavated in the 1990s. It has two semicircular towers of 8.20 meters in diameter made of opus quadratum, at least in its lower part, which leave a four-meter span through which a paved road ran. Other doors were Puerta de Rey, Puerta del Sol, Puerta del Obispo and Postigo de San Julián.

=== Domestic architecture ===
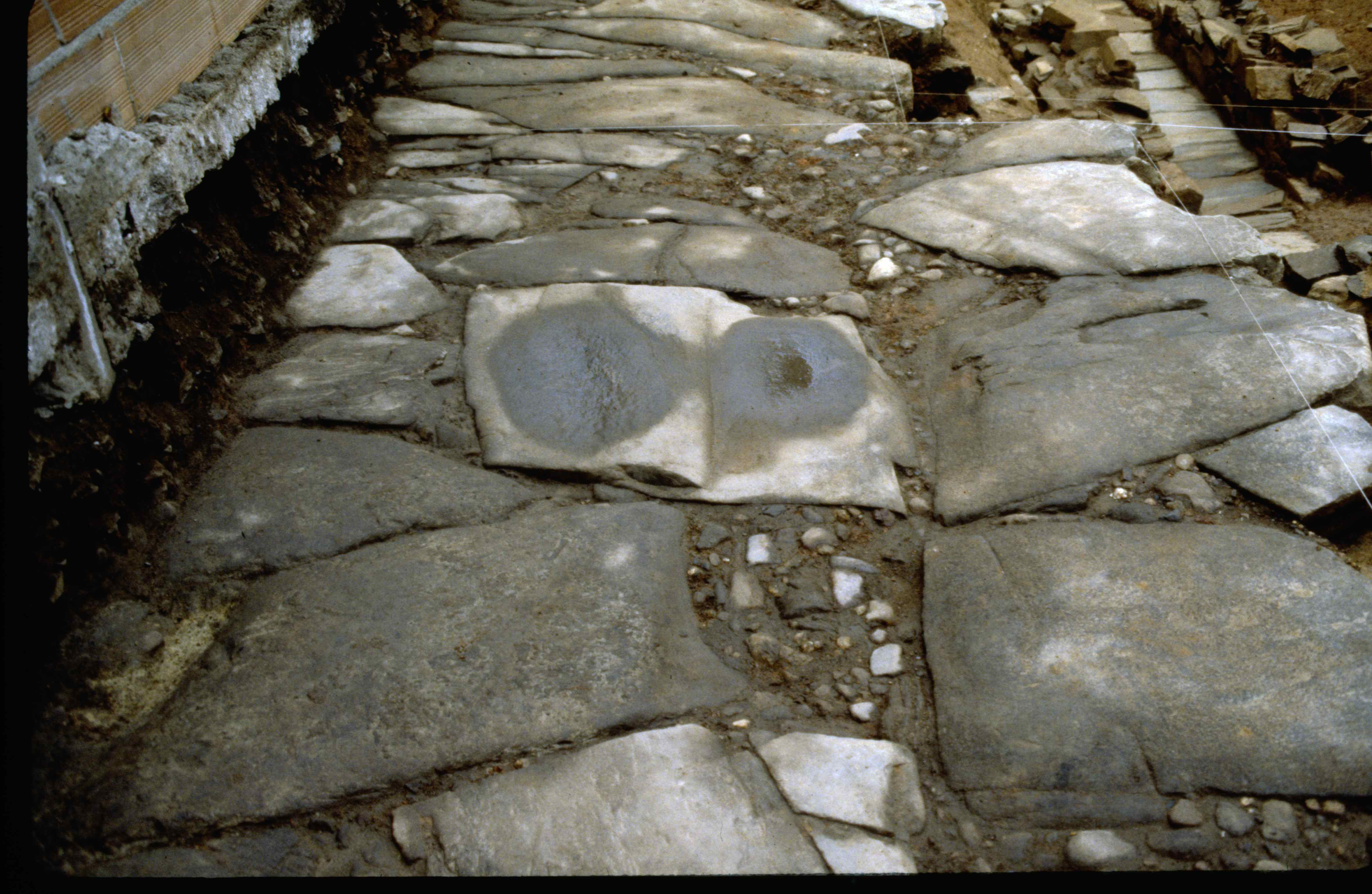
Cardo Maximo of the city

None of the dwellings found could be excavated in their entirety, nor could any structure related to artisanal activity be identified. This is due to the problem of obtaining, in a complete way, the plan of the ancient buildings: the plot of the modern city is not similar to that of the Roman period.

Among all the known asturian domus a series of them stand out for their construction and for the ornaments that were part of the building. All of them used stone to build their walls, although it must have been shared with other types of materials, such as adobe or rammed earth. The stone used was mainly quartzite from the Cape Series, and slate from Luarca. Both are easily found in the surroundings of the city, due to the fact that such geological formations predominate in the area.

Another series of materials were also used for construction; in the surroundings of Astorga clay abounds, whose use is proven both in adobe and rammed earth and for the union of the walls. Although the existence of ceramic potteries is not known, it must be thought that tiles and bricks were manufactured in the area around the city and then used in construction. This is evidenced by the numerous tiles (tegulae) and imbrices (imbrices) found in the archaeological works; the brick (later coctus) is abundant, as for example in the thermal complexes, at the time of raising the pillars of the hypocaust.

The first excavations of a domestic ensemble took place in 1954 in Santocildes Square by José María Luengo. The first news of such a finding are collected in 1921 but it was not until the middle of the century when the General Commissariat of Archaeological Excavations included the intervention in its National Plan. A house was found in which two complete rooms and part of three others were found. Most of its walls preserved paintings in situ, a group called Pinturas Pompeyanas, dating from the first half of the second century.

==== Domus of Great Peristyle ====
This domus must have occupied more than one insula and its oldest stage is located between the Julio-Claudian period and the third quarter of the first century. This phase presents a group of structures whose function, due to their degree of destruction, has not been clarified. Of all of them, a space designated as impluvium stands out, which would have served to organize the complex.

A second phase has a porticoed peristyle, with six columns on each side. This portico was surrounded by a small canal, which served to collect rainwater through the roof. In the center of the peristyle was a monumental fountain with four lobes, made of opus caementicium. Around the galleries would be located the rooms, for the construction of which an artificial terrace had to be built.

The dwelling also had a thermal sector. In its northern area, three spaces with hypocaust were found, which would correspond to the hot and warm rooms, although without remains of the praefurnia that would feed them, while in the southern area there was a space with opus sectile pavement, which could be the frigidarium. Adjacent to this, several rooms, with opus signinum floors, which would be service rooms.

==== Domus of the Mosaic of the Bear and the Birds ====
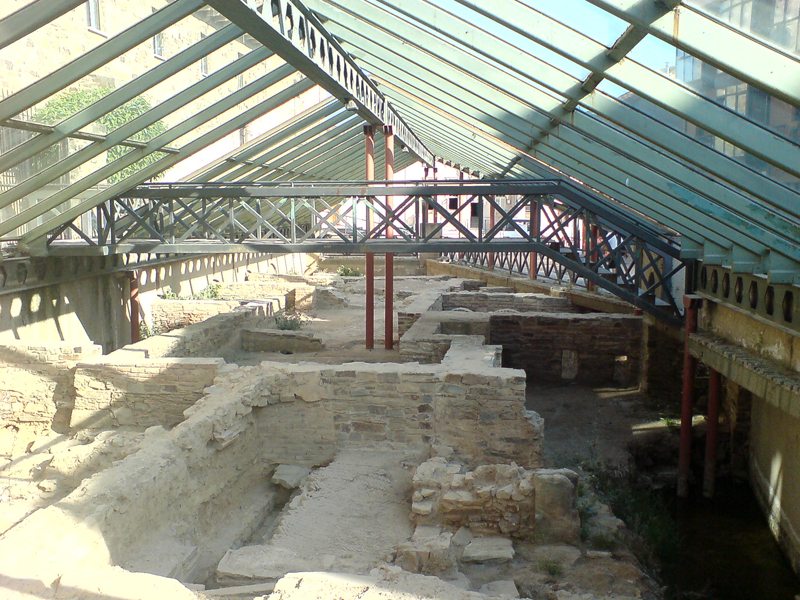
Partial view of the house

It is located in the southeastern end of the city and is one of the most important domestic complexes excavated in Astorga. The quality of the materials used, the variety of pavements (opus signinum, opus spicatum, opus tesselatum) and the mural painting on the walls are noteworthy. It also had a thermal complex consisting of a caldarium, tepidarium and frigidarium.

The most attractive is the mosaic paving one of the rooms, possibly a triclinium or oecus. Dated to the beginning of the Severan dynasty, it covers a square space; in the corners four vases or baskets, with floral motifs, and between them paintings with scenes of birds. These paintings surround a central motif, which must have been composed of ten medallions representing various animals, such as a bear and a leopard.

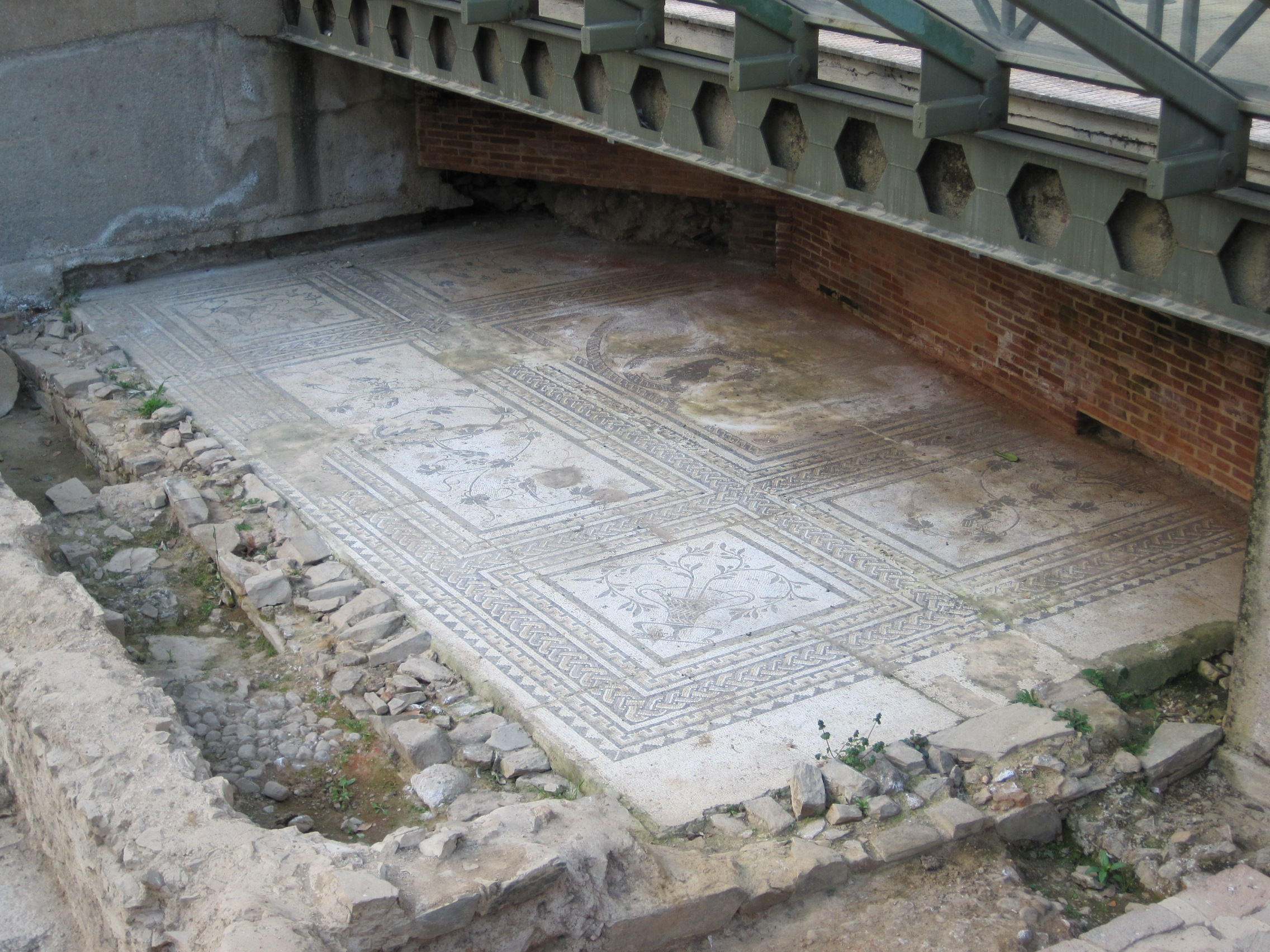
View of the mosaic of the Bear and the Birds

The house was organized around a central peristyle. Its plan underwent a series of reforms, among which stands out the one carried out at the end of the first century or beginning of the second; this involved a profound remodeling of the area and, for example, the space occupied by the thermal complex was enabled in the place occupied by a sewer already in disuse. This also led to the displacement of the public road axis to the west.

==== Domus of the pavement of Opus Signinum ====
Located next to the northwest corner of the forum, this house is a good example of the urban development that the city underwent during the first century. The oldest spaces offer a northeast–southwest orientation, which is the same as the rest of the buildings in the western part of the city. This organization was maintained until the middle of the first century, until the Flavian period when the floor plan of the building changed and its rooms were organized around a peristyle.

A room with a pavement of opus signinum belongs to the first period of the dwelling, dated to the end of Tiberius (14–37) and the beginning of Claudius (41–54).

==== Domus of the Denarii ====
The house is so called because of the discovery of a monetary set in the sediments on which it was built; the set is composed of 28 denarii, most of which correspond to the time of Augustus and Tiberius. It was probably organized around a rectangular pond, around which ran a corridor that gave access to the different rooms.

It is remarkable a small space that had a slate slab pavement and a drain that flowed into the sewage system of the house. Therefore, it could have been an atrium with its corresponding impluvium. It has also been confirmed that the house had a running water system, since a lead pipe was found with a bronze stopcock. The house has been dated to the third quarter of the first century, in the Flavian period, existing until the fifth century, in the late period.

=== Suburban area ===
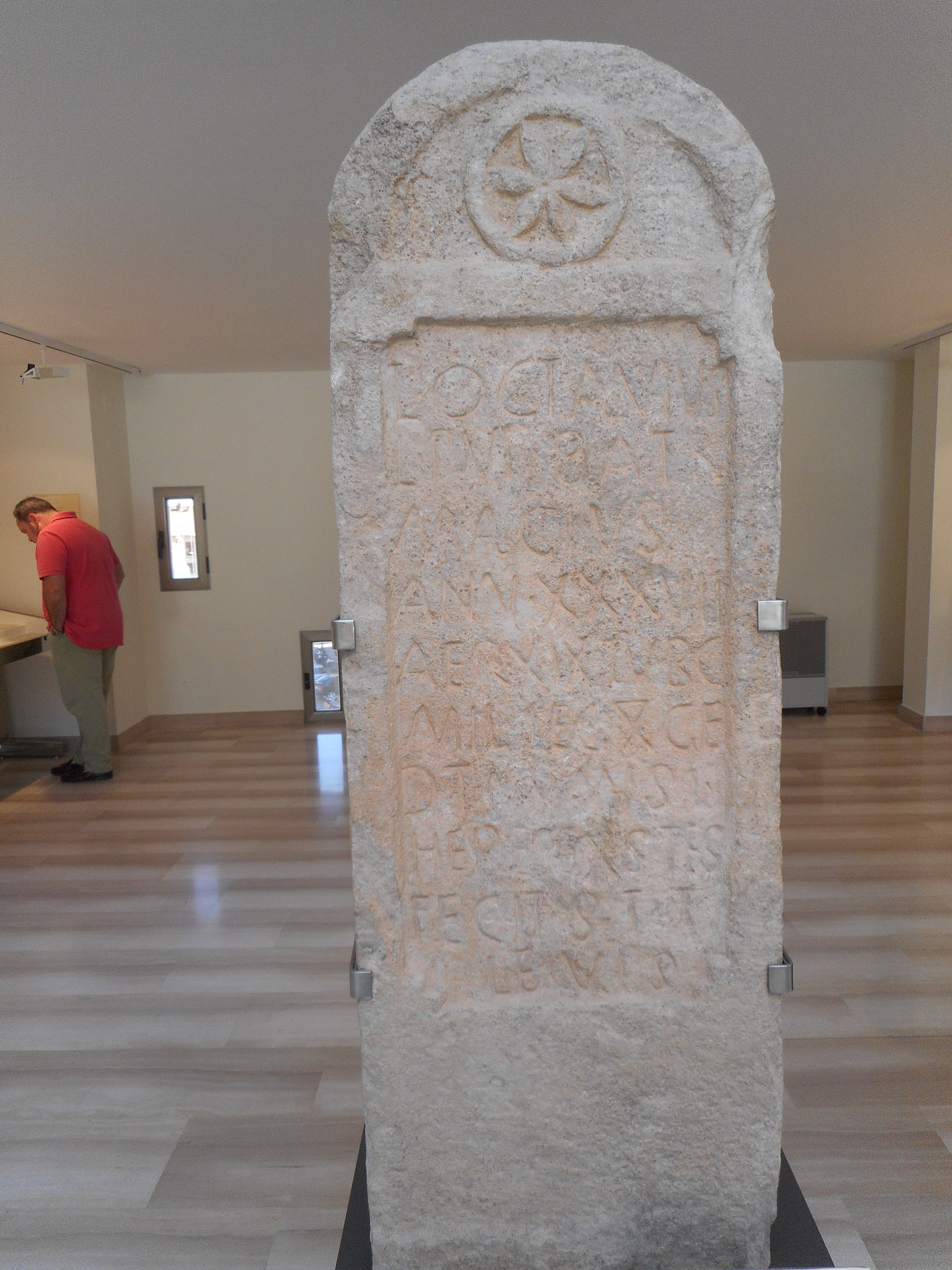
Funerary inscription found in the city

In the area outside the walls, several interventions have been carried out; at the foot of the western wall, a wall was found whose construction required a hollowing out of the geological substratum. This trench must have functioned as a dump, since a large quantity of materials and levels of ash were found. As for the wall, contemporary to the Alto-Imperial wall, it would have served as a containment for the materials dragged from the upper part of the city and the slope of the hill.

Several necropolises have also been documented outside the city walls, mainly as a result of chance finds. In 1888 was located southeast of the city, in Prado Otoño, a masonry tomb inside which was a glass cinerary urn. In 1923 several tombs were found, made with tegulae, in the northern corner, next to Puerta de Hierro. In 1935, in the Royal Moldería, several burial and cremation burials were found. Another report indicates the existence of a late Roman burial next to the disappeared convent of San Dictino. Another discovery was made in the eighties, in the Colegio Santa María Madre de la Iglesia, where a tombstone was found associated with a cremation necropolis.

In 2002, an archaeological intervention was carried out in Via Nova street, during the gas pipeline works, which allowed the documentation of a funerary enclosure. Three tombs were found, made of brick, which housed two men and a woman and contained the remains of grave goods. Another burial was composed of boulders, which sealed the burial of a fetus. Two cremations were also documented, one infant in a ceramic vessel and the other evidenced by an ash stain associated with materials.

=== Area of influence ===
Within the sphere of influence of the city, the archaeological interventions in the castro de la Magdalena—or de la Mesa—located in the district of Castrillo de los Polvazares, stand out. The first phase was carried out in 2006 as part of the Vías Augustas II project, financed by the European Social Fund for Regional Development. The site documentation, topographic survey and archaeological excavation were carried out. The land was acquired by Caja España and, through a collaboration agreement with the Astorga City Council, the use of the land was granted for 30 years, until 2035.

In 2008, the Instituto Leonés de Cultura agreed to continue the actions and to process an agreement between the City Council and the Diputación Provincial de León. The sectors excavated during the first campaign were expanded and a geomagnetic survey of the surroundings of the castro was carried out. The third campaign was carried out in 2010 and was financed by the Junta de Castilla y León and the City Council.

Thanks to the different campaigns, evidence was found of a prehistoric settlement whose occupation is chronologically located between the end of the Bronze Age and the beginning of the Iron Age. The settlement would have been composed of huts, of which only the imprint of the place where the posts would have been. Two storage structures excavated in the ground were also found. It was later occupied in Roman times, when it was organized around road axes. In the upper part, several phases of occupation were defined. The first, before the change of era, with combustion levels, castreño material and Italic terra sigillata; the second, in the middle of the first century, with the construction of a wall, streets and several buildings; finally, the third phase, in the second or third centuries, with the destruction of the wall.

== Administration ==
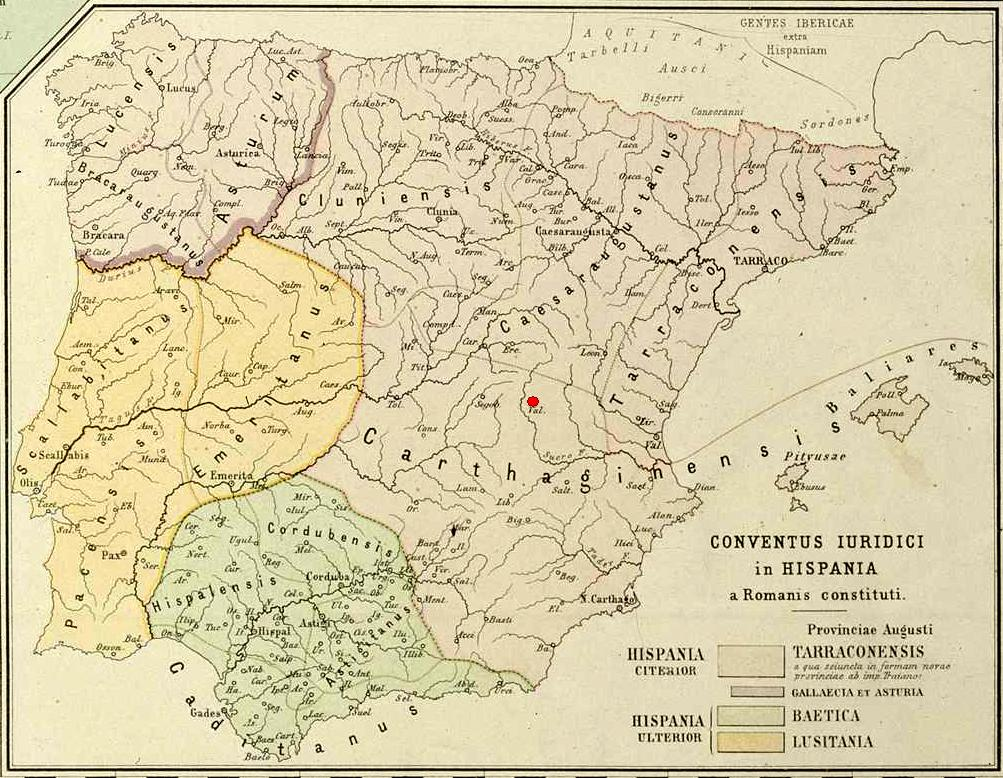
Administrative division of Roman Hispania, with Asturica being located in the Asturicense Convent

After the arrival of Rome and the establishment of a new social, territorial and fiscal order, Asturica Augusta became the administrative center under whose government a large territory was located—the Asturicense conventus—and through which the exploitation of economic resources was controlled, in addition to fiscal and political functions. It has traditionally been thought that Asturica was organized under the status of civitas peregrina; these were administered by a council that possessed the capacity to collect taxes and administer justice at the local level, and had to provide workers for mining operations.

At the same time, it has been rejected that its legal status was that of municipium; however, several authors are of the contrary opinion: Hartmut Galsterer admits that Asturica could have had such status due to the citation of a duumviro in the itinerary of mud. Likewise, Alain Tranoy is surprised that Asturica had been left out of the municipal policy that was developed during the territorial reorganization of the Northwest, which included examples such as Aquae Flaviae, Bracara Augusta and Lucus Augusti, and considers it improbable that it did not obtain municipal status, also taking into account that it was a population of the first order as it was the capital of a juridical convent. Such a municipal promotion could have taken place during Augustus' third trip to Hispania, between 15 and 13 BC, during which municipal status was granted to many Hispanic cities.

In favor of such status is also the epigraphy found in the city, in which different government positions related to the imperial power are mentioned. Such is the case of the legati, the procuratores Augusti (Procuratores Metallorum and Procurator Asturiae et Gallaeciae in the case of Asturica), an Augusti Dispensator and a Praeses Provinciae. Likewise, there are also references to the positions of Magistratus, Curator, Sacerdos and Flamines. All these epigraphic references indicate that the city played a central role in the northwest of the peninsula, with sufficient capacity to attract the indigenous population; the fact that the second part of the Pact of the Zoelas was signed in the city would confirm this theory.

This importance would also be confirmed by the tabula lougeiorum, which suggests the existence of an Ara Augusta (center dedicated to the Imperial Cult) in the place where the city would later be founded. This cult has not been archaeologically confirmed, unlike the one dedicated to the Capitoline Triad, mentioned in six inscriptions. In addition, Pliny's description of it as magnificent could be related to the growth it experienced due to gold mining, which would have attracted bureaucrats, officials, merchants and immigrants.

== Religion ==
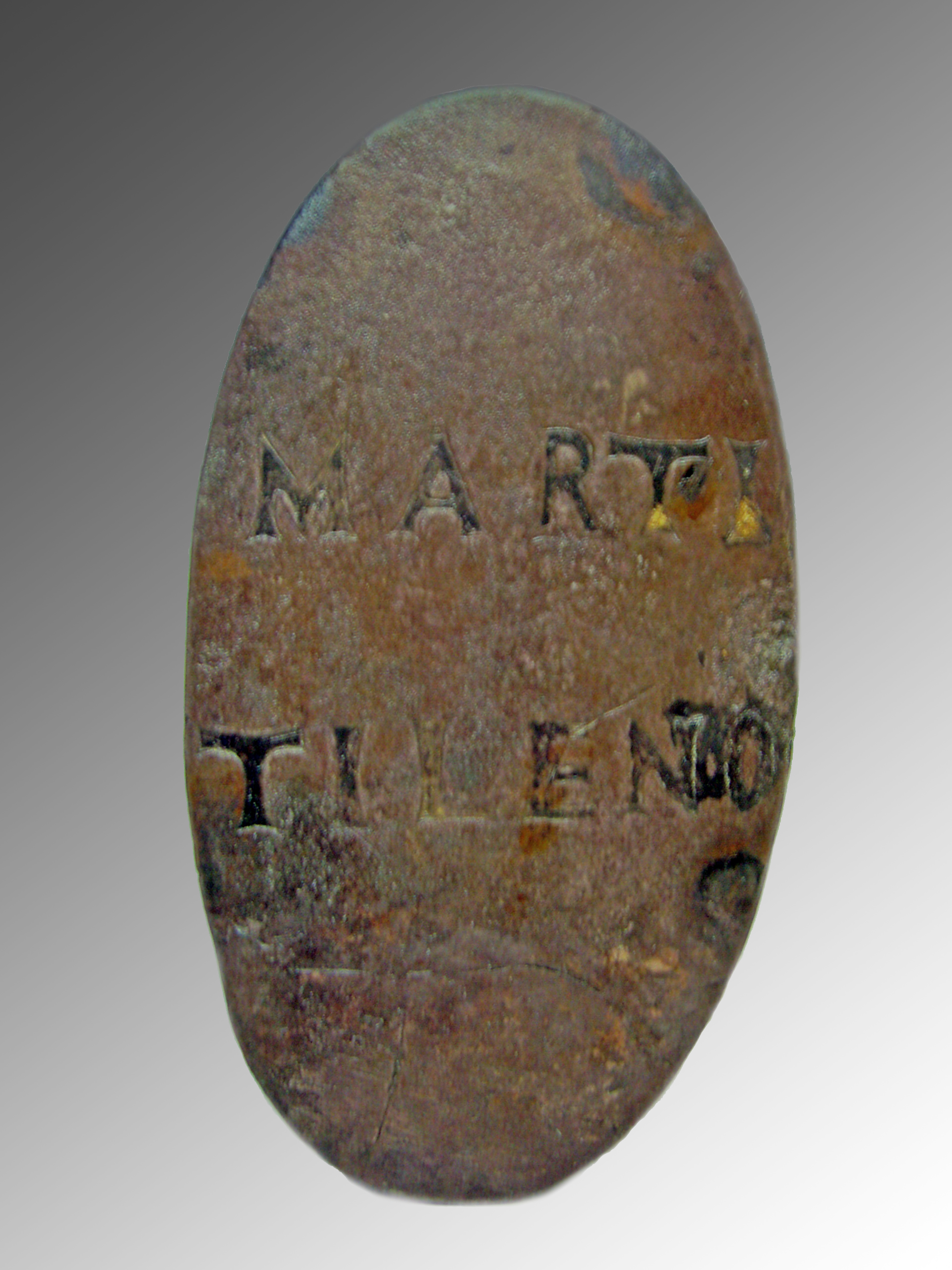
Plaque with the inscription Marti Tileno

Regarding the indigenous gods there is no mention of any mention in the territory of Astorga, however, the presence of the god Caraedudi can be found in the vicinity, in the village of Cuevas (next to the village of Celada de la Vega), and in Quintana del Marco, near the Teleno mountain, the plaque Marti Tileno was found, an indigenous god, lord of the mountain, that the Romans assimilated to Mars. However, these gods do not appear in the city of Astorga itself because its origin was Roman camp with an almost total absence of indigenous population.

=== Roman and Greek gods ===
The city of Astorga began its life with the Roman camp, so in the religious theme the Roman gods or the adopted Greek gods were welcomed. We have special news of those who had their cult in the city:

- Mars -from the beginning of the 3rd century-, since he was the god of war who helped the camp. In Astorga he was known as Gradivo -the god who also makes the harvest grow- and also as Sagato -in allusion to the sagum or campaign cloak worn by the soldiers-.
- Mercury, god of commerce and roads. He appears in Astorga only once on a secondary road that goes from this city to the gold mines of Las Médulas.
- Cult to the emperor and cult to the empress. It is natural that this cult existed since it was the capital of the Juridical Convent, where a large number of officials lived. Particularly noteworthy are the dedications to Julia Domna, who was considered and respected as mother of the emperor, mother of the senate, of the camp and of the homeland. This cult was consummated through the goddesses Minerva and Juno.
- Proserpina, daughter of Ceres, appears in Astorga with the novel title of Invicta.
- Apollo, god protector of the emperor, appears in Astorga assimilated as Granno, Celtic god that means garnet or shining like the garnet or shining like the sun. This Celtic god had a sanctuary in Trier.

The god Aesculapius and his son Telesphoros, related to medicine and healing, were also found in Astorga.

== Economy and food ==
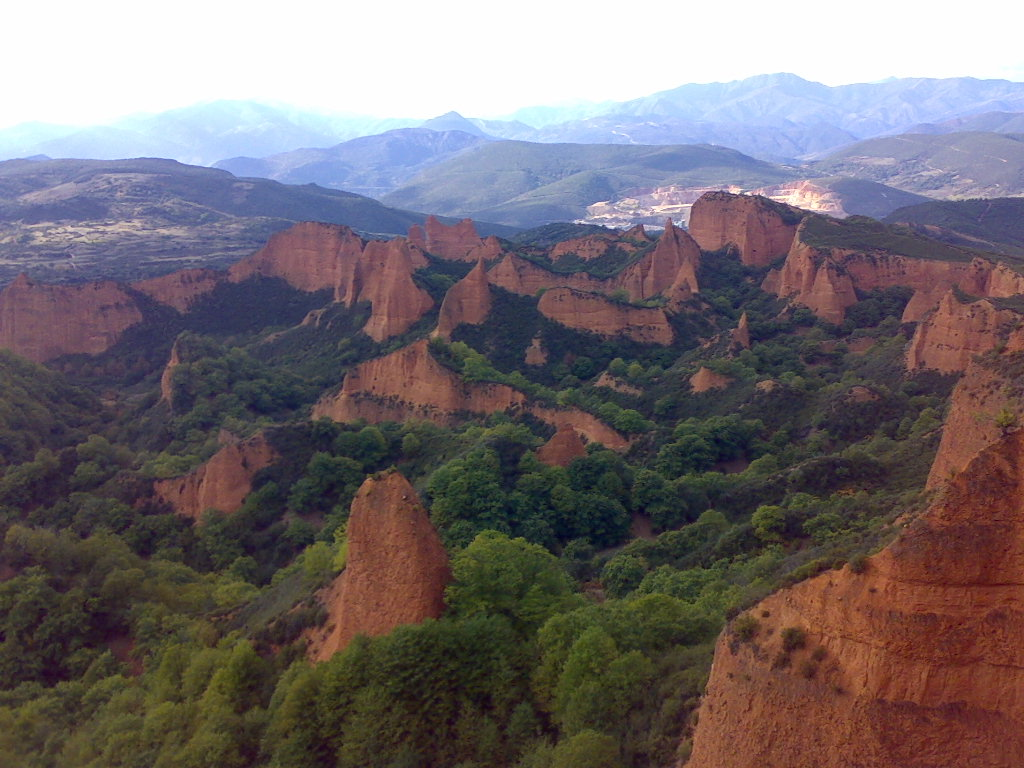
Panoramic view of Las Médulas

In addition to the exploitation of Las Médulas, in El Bierzo, Asturica had under its area of influence a set of mining operations, spread throughout the Maragatería, whose traces are still visible.

These exploitations have their origin in pre-Roman times, being abundant known asturian settlements. However, it was the Roman Empire that deeply developed mining at the foot of the Teleno; from the settlement of the Legio X Gemina until the foundation of the civil nucleus, about fifty years passed in which the territory was pacified and forts and crowns were established in relation to mining.

The work system was based on indigenous labor under the control of army units dependent on the Legio VII Gemina established in Leon. The engineering allowed productions of up to six tons per year, an outstanding figure considering that the richness of the layers is between three and six grams per ton.

As for the process, first the network of canals was built to carry the water from the rivers to the exploitation. Here it was stored in pools, such as those that can be seen in the Fucarona mine, and then released under pressure over cones and galleries; the cones dragged material to the places of sedimentation where the washing took place (arrugia), and the galleries collapsed the substrate to also direct it to the washing places (ruina montium).

... the mountains are mined along a great extension by means of galleries made by the light of lamps ... When the work of preparation is finished, the shoring of the vaults is demolished from the furthest away; the collapse is announced and the watchman placed at the top of the mountain is the only one who notices it. Consequently, he gives orders with shouts and gestures to warn the workmen and, at the same time, he himself flies down. The mountain, cracked, collapses by itself in the distance with a roar that cannot be imagined by the human mind, as well as with an incredible displacement of air...

— Pliny the Elder, Natural History

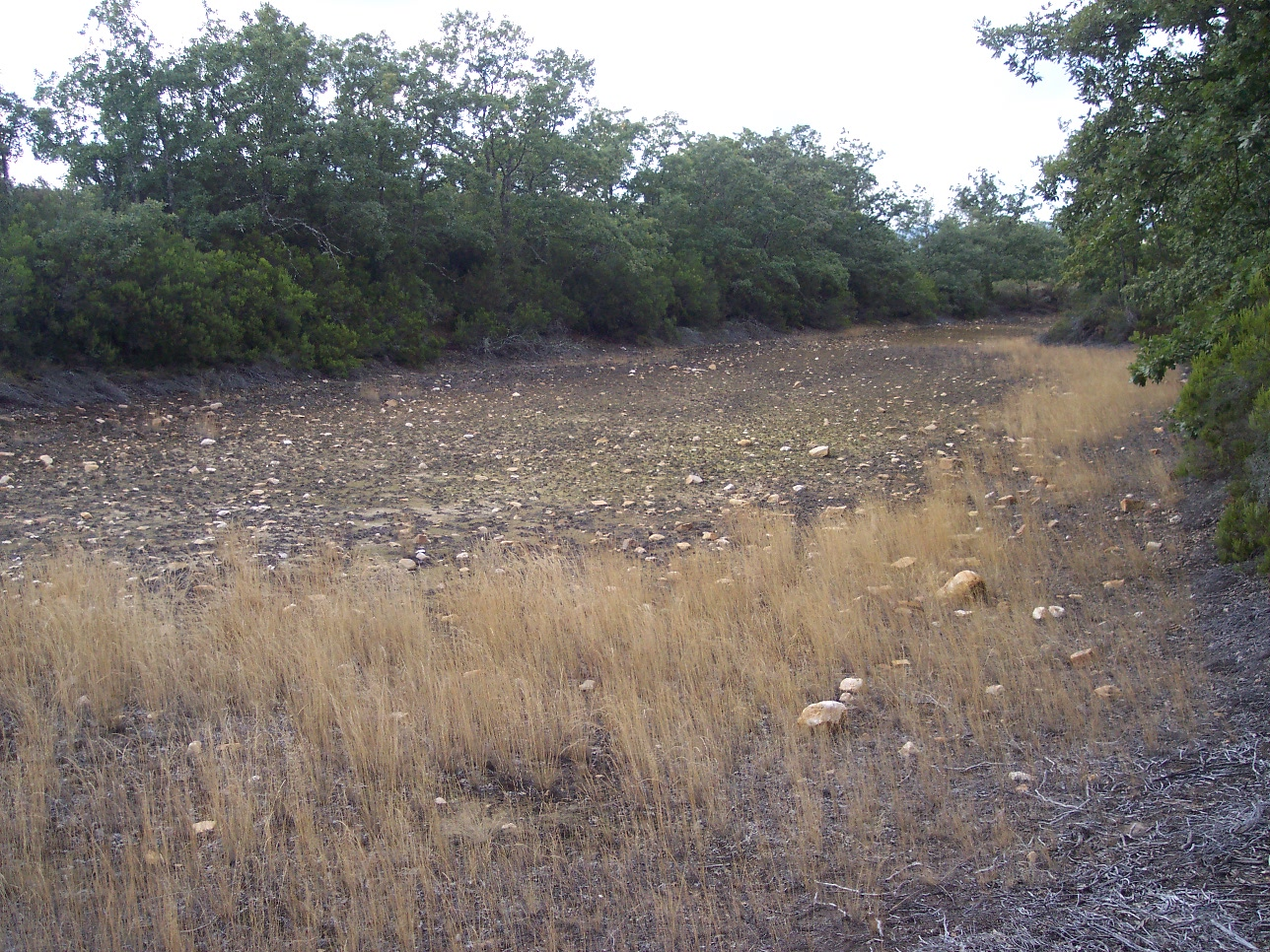
One of the pools at La Fucarona

In Maragatería, the predominant system is the arrugia system. For this reason, the exploitation sites are open, forming authentic valleys or artificial lagoons. The sterile materials, called murias, modified the landscape by forming outlet cones, built in many cases to facilitate the transport of the silt containing the gold. This mud was deposited in gently sloping channels that facilitated the sedimentation of heavy elements, and the finer ones were filtered until the metal was obtained. The period of splendor of the mines began with the Flavian dynasty, at the end of the first century, and lasted until the middle of the third century, when it went into decline. Among the mines that are preserved is the Fucarona, near Rabanal Viejo, where you can see the exploitation, some of the channels for transporting water and four pools for storage. Of these, the bottom is partially preserved, covered with stone to prevent the water from leaking into the ground.

Between Luyego and Priaranza de la Valduerna is located Fucochicos, another exploitation that arose with the arrugia system and also highlights the Corona de Pedredo, with the mining exploitation next to the settlement itself, and the Cernea Lagoon, remains of an exploitation next to Santa Colomba de Somoza.

Regarding food, in 2010 an archaeological research carried out by Carlos Fernández and Natividad Fuertes, from the area of Prehistory of the University of León, managed to rescue more than a thousand remains of mollusks, dated between the first and fourth centuries, from the successive archaeological excavations carried out in Astorga. Through their study they analyzed the importance of mollusks, mostly oysters, in the diet of the Roman population of Asturica, which had elite tastes in terms of food, and which implied the existence of a trading relationship with populations of the Atlantic coast.

== Communications ==
See also: Vía de la Plata

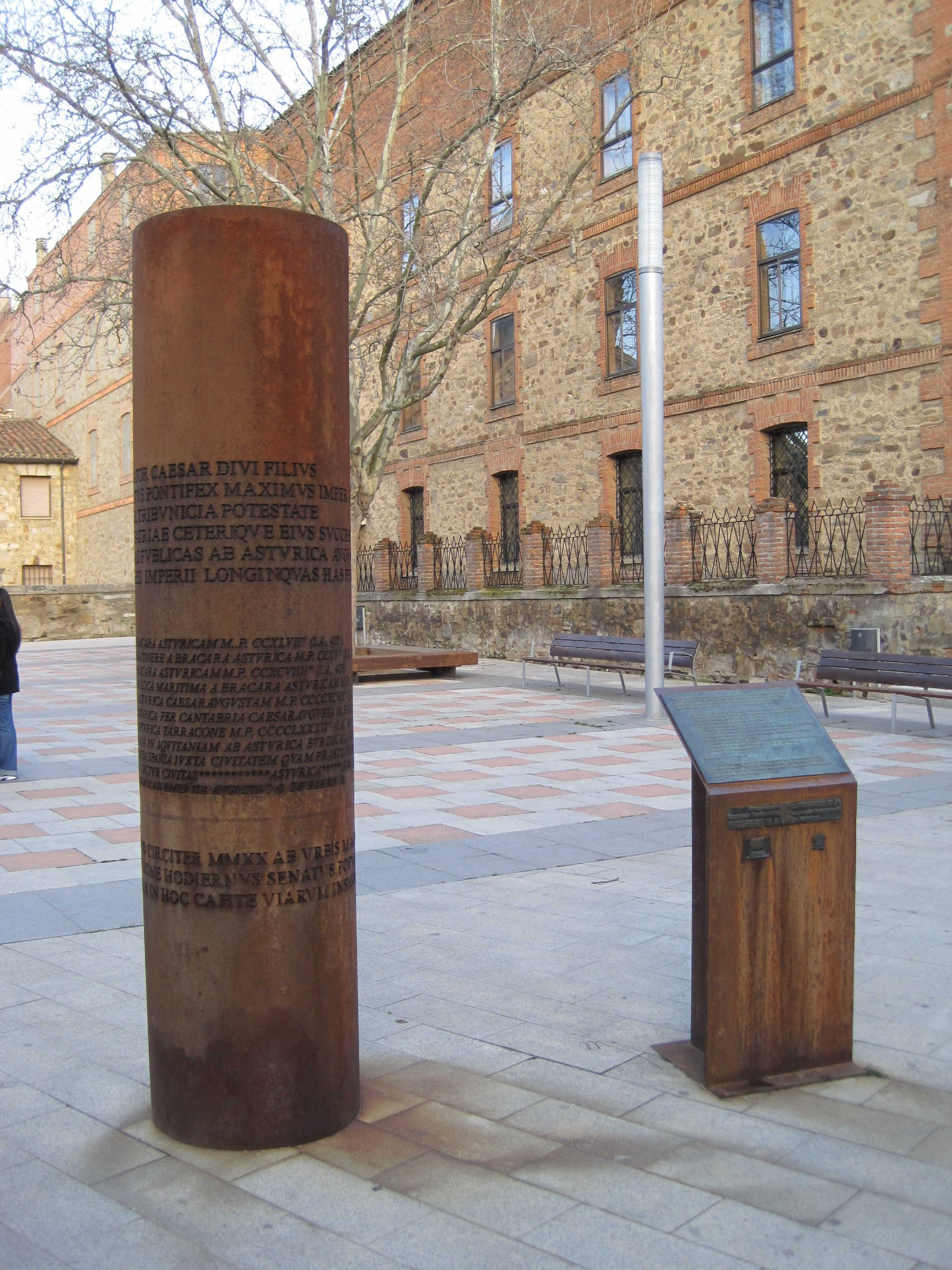
Commemorative furniture erected in 2006 in memory of the roads that passed through the city

Map of Via XXXIV

Since ancient times, Asturica Augusta played an important role in communications because it was an obligatory passage to reach the Bierzo and Galician lands, through the ports of Foncebadón and Manzanal. Likewise, its administrative and management role required a communications network—initially of a military nature—that would allow connection with other cities and act as an economic artery. The different roads that passed through the city are recorded in various documents; the most important is the Itinerary of Antoninus, written in the 3rd century, in the time of the emperor Caracalla, which indicates the following routes for Asturica Augusta:

Asturica Augusta in the Itinerary of Antoninus
Road	Route
Via XVII o Item a Bracara Asturicam	Asturica Augusta – Bracara Augusta
Via XVIII o Item alio itinere a Bracara Asturica	Asturica Augusta – Bracara Augusta
Via XIX o Item a Bracara Asturicam	Asturica Augusta – Lucus Augusti – Bracara Augusta
Via XX o Item per loca maritima a Bracara Asturicam	Asturica Augusta – Lucus Augusti – Bracara Augusta
Via XXVI o Item ab Asturica Caesaraugusta	Asturica Augusta – Caesaraugusta
Via XXVII o Ab Asturica per Cantabria Caesaraugusta	Asturica Augusta – Caesaraugusta
Via XXXII o Item ab Asturica Tarracone	Asturica Augusta – Tarraco
Via XXXIV o Ab Asturica Burdigalam	Asturica Augusta – Burdigala

Of all of them, the XXVI, which together with the XXIV formed the so-called Vía de la Plata, and the XXXIV, of great historical significance because centuries later it would be a pilgrimage route to Santiago de Compostela, stood out. Another document is the Tablas de Barro, found in the early 20th century in the vicinity of Astorga; Tablet III mentions a road between Asturica and Augusta Emerita and Tablet IV describes the road between Asturica and Bracara. The document enjoys certain controversies regarding its authenticity, although in 2012 it was possible to verify its authenticity through thermoluminescence, dating the tablets to the 3rd century. Other documents are the Anonymous of Ravenna, from the 7th century, which in one of the itineraries, coinciding with Antoninus' via XVIII, also mentions Asturica, and the Tabula peutingeriana, also from the 7th century, which copies a map from the 4th century.

== See also ==
- Antonine Itinerary
- Caesaraugusta

== Bibliography ==
- Alonso, Joaquín (2000). Astorga. Ciudad Bimilenaria. Valladolid: Ámbito
- Ares Alonso, Inocencio (1996). Asociación Leonesa de Municipios Mineros, ed. Astúrica y el oro astur. Gijón.
- Ares Alonso, Inocencio (1997). La ruta del oro: un recorrido por el país de maragatos. León: Edilesa
- Burón Álvarez, Milagros (2006). «El trazado urbano de Asturica Augusta». Nuevos elementos de ingeniería romana: III Congreso de las Obras Públicas Romanas: 289–312
- Cuervo Álvarez, Benedicto (2014). «La urbs Asturica Augusta». Historia Digital 14 (24): 72–110
- González, Mª Luz; Encina Prada, María; Vidal Encinas, Julio Manuel (2003). «Un recinto funerario romano en Asturica Augusta (Astorga, León)». Bolskan: Revista de arqueología del Instituto de Estudios Altoaragoneses (20): 297–308.
- Luengo Martínez, José María (1990). Ayuntamiento de Astorga, ed. Estudios Arqueológicos. Zamora
- Macías, Marcelo (1903). Epigrafía romana de la ciudad de Astorga. Orense: Imprenta A. Otero. Archivado desde el original el 24 de septiembre de 2015. Consultado el 28 de junio de 2015.
- Mañanes Pérez, Tomás (1982). Universidad de León, ed. Epigrafía y numismática de Astorga romana y su entorno. León. ISBN 978-84-7481-214-5
- Mañanes Pérez, Tomás (1983). Universidad de Valladolid, ed. Astorga romana y su entorno. Valladolid.
- Pérez Centeno, Mª del Rosario (1999). «Un enclave romano de primer orden en el norte peninsular». Gallaecia (18): 265–274
- Regueras Grande, Fernando (1991). «Mosaicos romanos de Asturica Augusta». Boletín del Seminario de Estudios de Arte y Arqueología: BSAA 57: 131–162
- Rodríguez, Matías (1909). Historia de Astorga. León
- Sevillano Fuertes, Mª Ángeles; Vidal Encinas, Julio Manuel (2002). Ayuntamiento de Astorga, ed. Urbs Magnífica. Una aproximación a la arqueología de Asturica Augusta. León.
- Sevillano Fuertes, Mª Ángeles (2014). «Apuntes arqueológicos para la historia antigua de Astorga». Cuadernos (Astorga: Centro de Estudios Astorganos Marcelo Macías) (31)
