= Truttedia gens =

Ancient Roman family

The gens Truttedia was a plebeian family at ancient Rome. No members of this gens appear in history, but a number are known from inscriptions, some of whom were minor officials at Rome and in the provinces.

== Origin ==
The nomen Truttedius belongs to a class of gentilicia formed using the suffix -idius or -edius, originally derived from cognomina ending in -idus. After this type of formation had become sufficiently familiar, these came to be regarded as regular gentile-forming suffixes, and were applied to other names by analogy. Truttedius belongs to this latter group.

== Praenomina ==
The main praenomina of the Truttedii were Publius, Sextus, and Gaius, all of which were common throughout all periods of Roman history. A few members of this gens bore other common names, including Lucius and Titus.

== Members ==
This list includes abbreviated praenomina. For an explanation of this practice, see filiation.

- Titus Truttedius, named along with Quintus Maculnius and Aulus Turius Ochac[...] as the curatores, minor officials, at Catina in Sicily, at some point in the Augustan period.
- Truttedia C. l. Restituta, a freedwoman buried at Aquileia in Venetia and Histria, in a tomb built by Lucius Turpilius Sabinus for himself, his patron, Turpilius Modestus, Truttedia, and possibly others.
- Gaius Truttedius Fructus, buried at Aquileia, along with Lucius Pontius Auctus, in a tomb dating from the latter half of the first century, or the early part of the second.
- Quintus Planius Sardus C. f. Truttedius Pius, an eques, and commander of an ala in Moesia Inferior during the reign of Nerva, was probably a member of the Plania gens, (Note: Due to the polyonymous nomenclature of the Roman aristocracy during this period, Sardus could have been a Truttedius who prefixed the name of a more illustrious Planius in his maternal line to his paternal name, or who was adopted by a Quintus Planius Sardus. At Minturnae we find both a Quintus Planius Felix and a Gaius Truttedius Pius.) perhaps by adoption from the Truttedii, from whom he was almost certainly a descendant. He might have been the father of the second-century senator Quintus Planius Sardus Lucius Varius Ambibulus, (Note: Varius was probably the son of Lucius Varius Ambibulus, and adopted by a Quintus Planius Sardus, or perhaps he was descended from the Planii through a female line.) consul in AD 132 or 133.
- Gaius Truttedius Pius, dedicated a tomb at Minturnae in Latium, dating from the first half of the second century, for his mother, Pompeia Catulla, a priestess of the imperial cult, built at public expense by a decree of the decurions.
- Sextus Truttedius Clemens, tribune of a cohort of the vigiles at Rome during the middle part of the second century, was later procurator of Dalmatia and Histria, then of Asturia and Gallaecia in Spain. He and his wife, the freedwoman Marrinia Procula, dedicated a tomb at Rome to their infant son, Sextus Truttedius Maximianus. Clemens later dedicated a tomb for Marrinia Procula at Asturica Augusta in Hispania Citerior.
- Sextus Truttedius Sex. f. Maximianus, an infant buried at Rome, aged seven months, in a tomb built by his parents, Sextus Truttedius Clemens and Marrinia Procula.
- Truttedius Zmaracdus Reginus, buried at Puteoli in Campania, in a tomb dedicated by one or more of his children, dating from the second century, or the first half of the third.
- Truttedius, named in a Severan-era inscription from Rome, probably as a cornicularius, adjutant to a centurion in an uncertain military unit.

=== Undated Truttedii ===
- Lucius Truttedius P. f., dedicated a tomb at Verona in Venetia and Histria for himself and Secunda Baebia, perhaps his wife.
- Publius Truttedius, named in a sepulchral inscription from Bononia in Cisalpine Gaul.
- Publius Truttedius Amphio, built a tomb at the site of modern Budrio, formerly part of Cisalpine Gaul, for his client and former slave, Truttedia Appia. He might be the same Publius Truttedius Amphio who was the former master of Publius Truttedius Fronto.
- Truttedia Appia, a freedwoman, buried at the site of modern Budrio, with a monument from her patron and former master, Publius Truttedius Amphio.
- Sextus Truttedius Clemens, built a cinerarium at Ancona in Picenum for his son, Sextus Truttedius Sabinus.
- Publius Truttedius P. l. Fronto, the freedman of Publius Truttedius Amphio, (Note: Perhaps the same one who built a tomb for his freedwoman and client, Truttedia Appia. Although both Fronto and Philomusus were the freedmen of a Publius Truttedius, they may not have been freed by the same man—Philomusus' filiation calls him the libertus of Publius, while Fronto's calls him the freedman of Amphio, in the same inscription.) built a tomb at Ateste in Venetia and Histria for Publius Truttedius Philomusus.
- Publius Truttedius P. l. Philomusus, a freedman buried at Ateste, in a tomb built by Publius Truttedius Fronto.
- Publius Truttedius P. l. Philomusus, a freedman buried at Verona, along with his wife, Magia Maxima, in a tomb dedicated by one or more of their children.
- Truttedius Pius, named in an inscription from Suessa Aurunca in Campania.
- Sextus Truttedius Sex. f. Sabinus, buried at Ancona in a cinerarium built by his father, Sextus Truttedius Clemens.
- Publius Truttedius P. f. Tertius, buried at Verona, in a tomb dedicated by one or more of his siblings.

== See also ==
- List of Roman gentes

== Bibliography ==
- Theodor Mommsen et alii, Corpus Inscriptionum Latinarum (The Body of Latin Inscriptions, abbreviated CIL), Berlin-Brandenburgische Akademie der Wissenschaften (1853–present).
- Ettore Pais, Corporis Inscriptionum Latinarum Supplementa Italica (Italian Supplement to the Corpus Inscriptionum Latinarum), Rome (1884).
- René Cagnat et alii, L'Année épigraphique (The Year in Epigraphy, abbreviated AE), Presses Universitaires de France (1888–present).
- George Davis Chase, "The Origin of Roman Praenomina", in Harvard Studies in Classical Philology, vol. VIII, pp. 103–184 (1897).
- Paul von Rohden, Elimar Klebs, & Hermann Dessau, Prosopographia Imperii Romani (The Prosopography of the Roman Empire, abbreviated PIR), Berlin (1898).
- Giovanni Battista Brusin, Inscriptiones Aquileiae (Inscriptions of Aquileia), Udine (1991–1993).
- Olli Salomies, Adoptive and Polyonymous Nomenclature in the Roman Empire, Societas Scientiarum Fennica, Helsinki (1992).
- Werner Eck and Margaret M. Roxan, "Two New Military Diplomas", in Römische Inschriften – Neufunde, Neulesungen und Neuinterpretationen, Festschrift für Hans Lieb, Regula Frei-Stolba, ed., M. A. Speidel, Basel (1995).
