= Castrillo de los Polvazares =

Village in Leon, Spain

Coordinates: 42.4650°N 6.1286°W

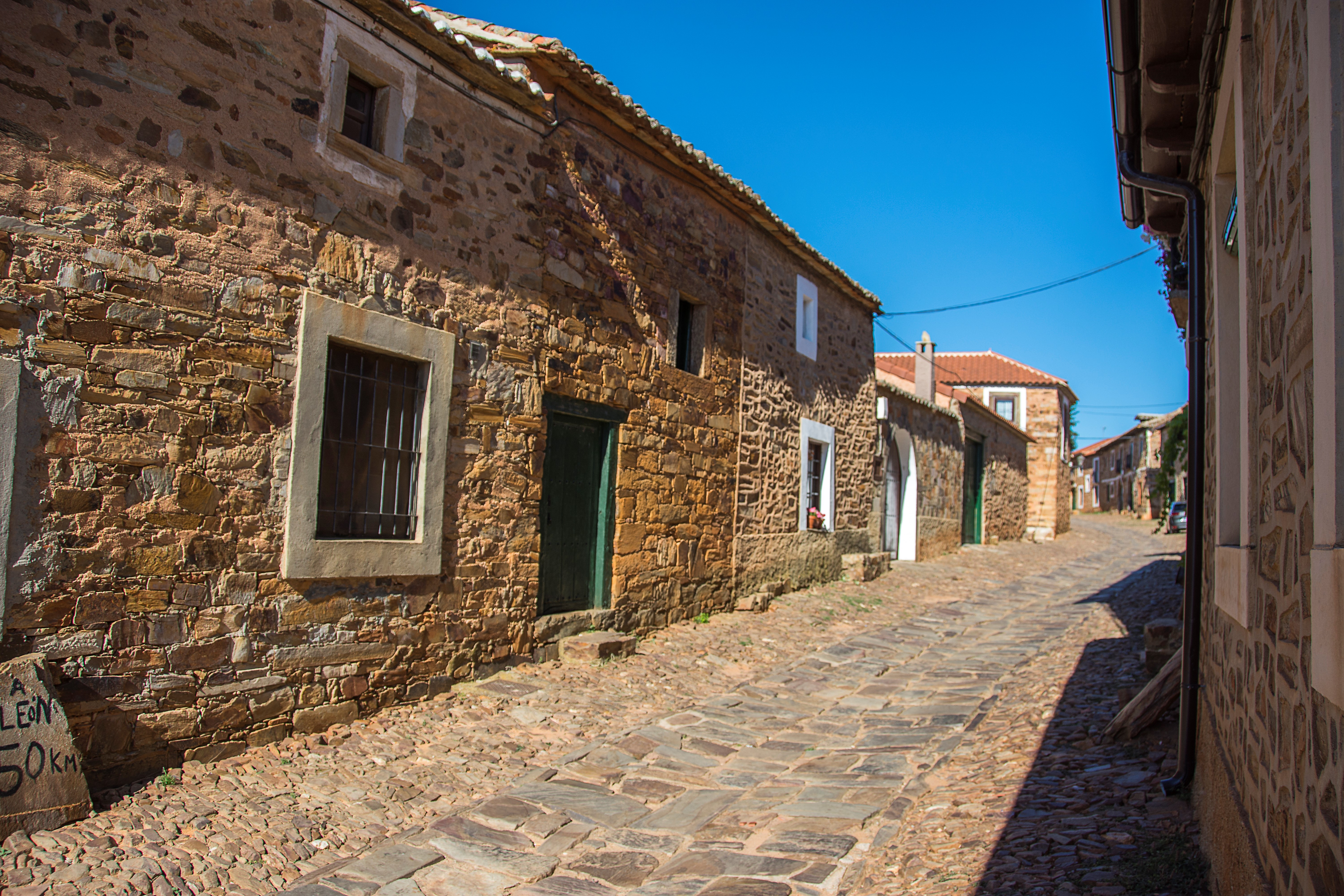
Castrillo de los polvazares

Castrillo de los Polvazares is a village situated in Leon, in North-west of Spain. It is part of the municipality of Astorga. It's important due to its history, as one of the few places of the “Maragatería” which still keeps its traditions and was one of the main resistances against the French conquests.

== History ==
It isn't known the date when Castrillo was founded, but it would probably be by the time the "Maragatería" did, with the Roman Empire, when Austurica Augusta (Astorga) was founded. It was destroyed by a flood in the 16th century and rebuilt again in the location where it is to date.

Castrillo was one of the most important places for the reconquest of Astorga in the Independence Spanish War, as it was the first village of the "Maragatería" where the Spanish troops rebelled against the French army.

You can find much more information about the village on the following link: CastrilloDeLosPolvazares.com

== Economy ==
The main economic activity of people today is based on tourism and handicrafts. Its main tourist attractions are its typical architecture and also the gastronomy, with the popular "Cocido Maragato". The most popular restaurants in town are located in houses that need maragatas rehabilitated. You can find some of them in the #References of this page.

== Architecture ==
Castrillo has kept its original architecture since the 16th century. It means every building is made of stone, and the road isn't asphalted to keep its original appearance, but it's paved with stones. On the 1980 it was declared a Historic-Artistic Set of Great Value.

According to some sources, the name "Castrillo" comes from the closeness of two forts: the "Castro de San Martino" and "Teso de la Mesa".

== Culture ==
Castrillo de los Polvazares is the location chosen by the writer Concha Espina to locate his novel "La Esfinge Maragata", which renamed the village as "Valdecruces". Another personality associated with this town is René Clair, French cinema director, whose wife lived there until his death in 2006.

In 2004 and 2006 were held in Castrillo the Napoleonicas Journeys, in memory of the Independence Spanish War. In those days, French and Spanish armies march through Astorga, generals harangued his troops, and recreates the attack and siege of the city in 1810. At first the Spanish capitulated. Later, the battle moves to Castrillo de los Polvazares. There, in the first battle, the mayor and the priest are captured by Napoleon's troops while on the town. At nightfall, in the second battle, the Spanish counter-attack, rescue and release to the village mayor. This battle leads to the subsequent recapture of Astorga.
