= Luyego =

- municipality
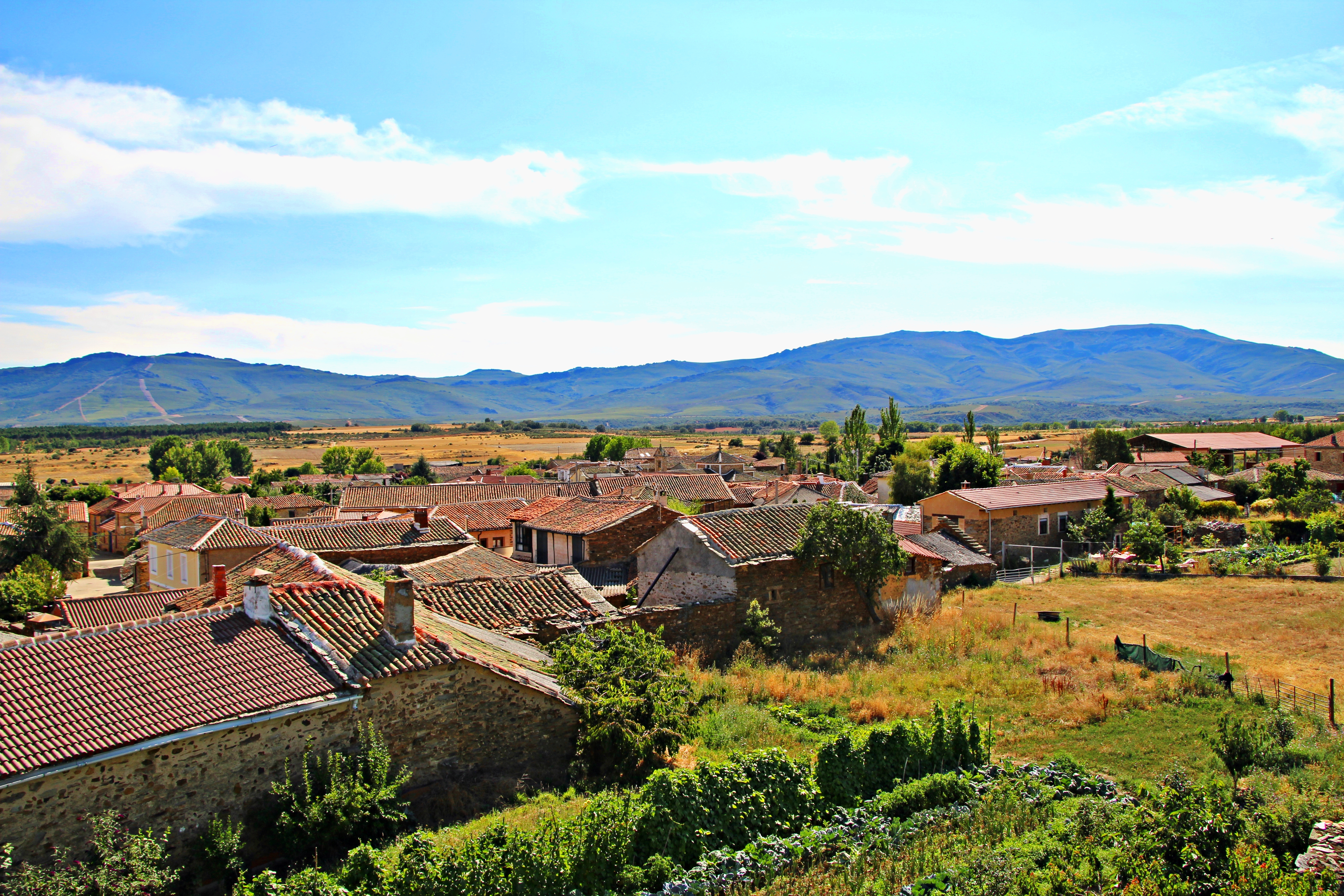

- Flag Coat of arms

- Location within Spain
- Coordinates: 42°22′N 6°14′W
- Country: Spain
- Autonomous community: Castile and León
- Province: León
- Municipality: Luyego

Government
  - Mayor: María Luisa Rodríguez Rodríguez (PSOE)

Area
  - Total: 132.31 km^{2} (51.09 sq mi)
- Elevation: 1,066 m (3,497 ft)

Population (2025-01-01)
  - Total: 537
  - Density: 4.06/km^{2} (10.5/sq mi)
- Time zone: UTC+1 (CET)
  - Summer (DST): UTC+2 (CEST)
- Postal Code: 24717, 24721
- Telephone prefix: 987
- Climate: Csb
- Website: Ayto. de Luyego

Luyego (Spanish pronunciation: [luˈʝeɣo]) is a municipality located in the province of León, Castile and León, Spain. According to the 2010 census (INE), the municipality has a population of 780 inhabitants.
