= Regula Frei-Stolba =

Swiss historian

Regula Frei-Stolba (born 29 March 1940 in Zürich) is a Swiss historian and epigraphist, best known for her books on Latin epigraphy and Roman numismatics, such as Untersuchungen zu den Wahlen in der römischen Kaiserzeit (1967), La politique édilitaire dans les provinces de l’empire romain IIème – IVème siècles après J.-C. (1993), and Les inscriptions. Textes, traduction et commentaire (1996).
