= Petavonium =

Coordinates: 42.0889°N 5.9980°W

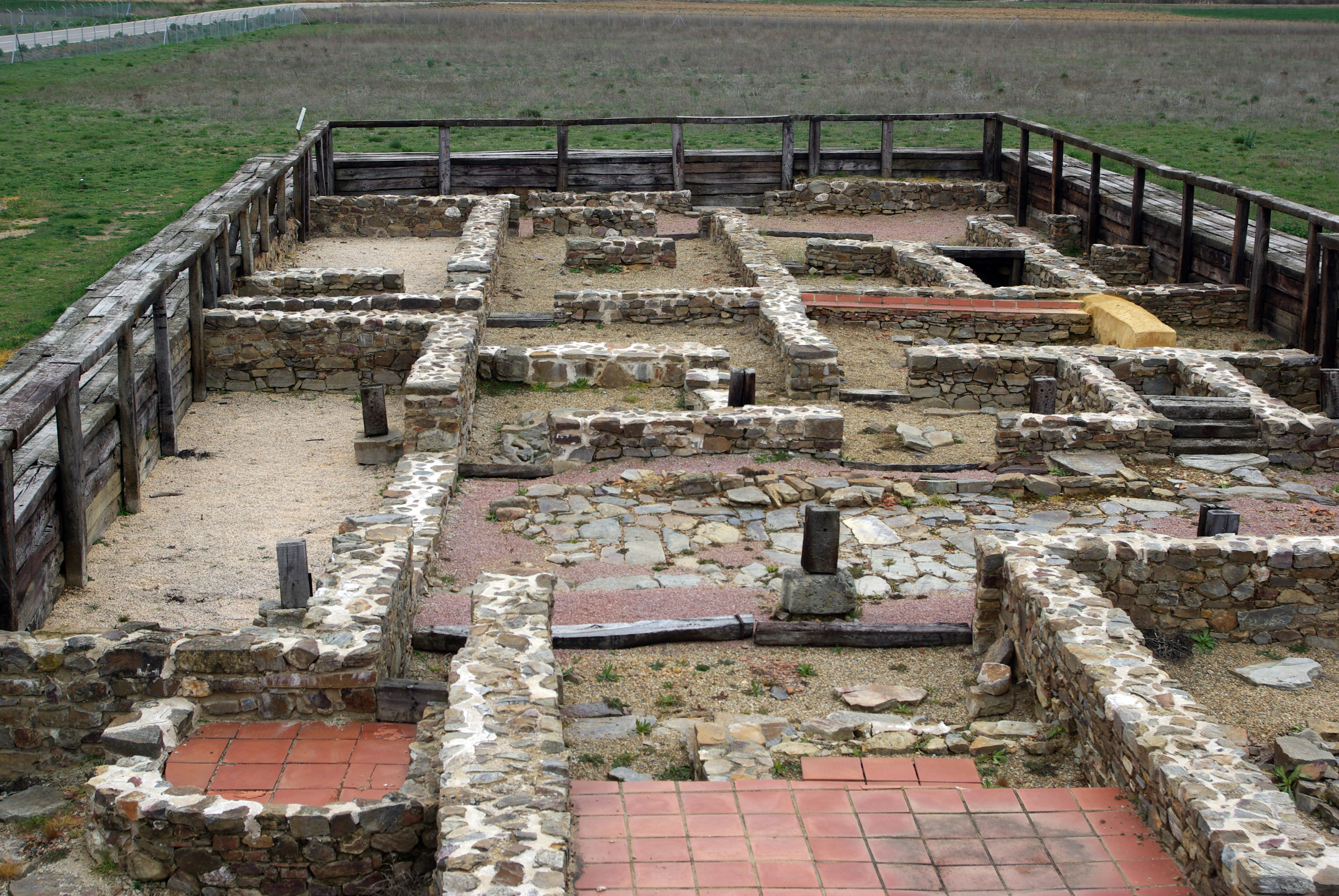
Roman ruins of Petavonium, near Benavente, Zamora, (Spain)

Petavonium was a Roman Legionary Fortress (castrum) of the Legio X Gemina, and later a Roman city formed from the canabae, or civilian camp. It was located in the valley of Vidriales in an area of the modern Santibanez de Vidriales and its hamlet Rosinos de Vidriales, in the province of Zamora (Castilla y Leon).

The legion was located here during the war against the Astures and Cantabrians to control the routes that connected this area with Gallaecia and with the rest of the valley of Douro and Lusitania, including those used for transportation of gold from the mines of Las Médulas o Cavenes.

The archaeological evidence shows a camp of about 20 ha, many ceramic remains, coins, remains of weapons and other metal objects, and building materials stamped with the legion's motif.

The departure of the legion in 63 AD must have been a setback for the town but it began to recover in the Flavian dynasty, probably under Domitian, when Ala II Flavia Hispanorum Civium Romanorum was stationed in the old barracks of X Gemina. The new fort, a castellum alae, was a rectangular walled enclosure of about 4 ha built inside the former camp.

Around this camp emerged a vicus, or town, of about 80 ha. The legion's presence attracted large numbers of people, Hispanics and Italians, who created a dense network of rural settlements in the Vidriales valley and which became the future city of Petavonium. In the 2nd and 3rd centuries AD it became one of the largest cities in Asturian territory.

Remains are preserved of the gates, especially the praetoria double gates, of the principia, or headquarters, and of the valetudinarium, or hospital. Also found were numerous coins of the 1st to 4th centuries, weapons, terra sigillata and ceramics, along with building materials such as bricks sealed with motifs of the Ala and Legio VII Gemina with which legion it had collaborated in Africa and in northern Portugal, near Aquae Flaviae (Chaves).

In the later Empire, possibly from Diocletian, the resident unit became the Cohors II Flavia Pacatiana, still active at the end of the fourth century according to Notitia Dignitatum.

The civil nucleus is mentioned in the Antonine Itinerary as a mansio on the road linking Asturica Augusta (Astorga) with Bracara Augusta (Braga).

Numerous inscriptions are embedded in the houses and churches in nearby villages.

The city was abandoned in the 5th century as a result of the barbarian invasions.
