= José María Luengo Martínez =

Spanish writer and archaeologist

- Born: 17 May 1896; Astorga, Spain
- Died: 1991 (aged 95); A Coruña, Spain
- Scientific career
- Fields: Archaeology

José María Luengo Martínez (1896–1991) was a Spanish writer and archaeologist. He was born in Astorga on May 17, 1896 and died in A Coruña in 1991. He was the son of Crescencio Luengo and Maria Dolores Martinez and was baptized in the parish of San Bartolomé de Astorga (León).
