= Ghost town =

Abandoned settlement with intact features

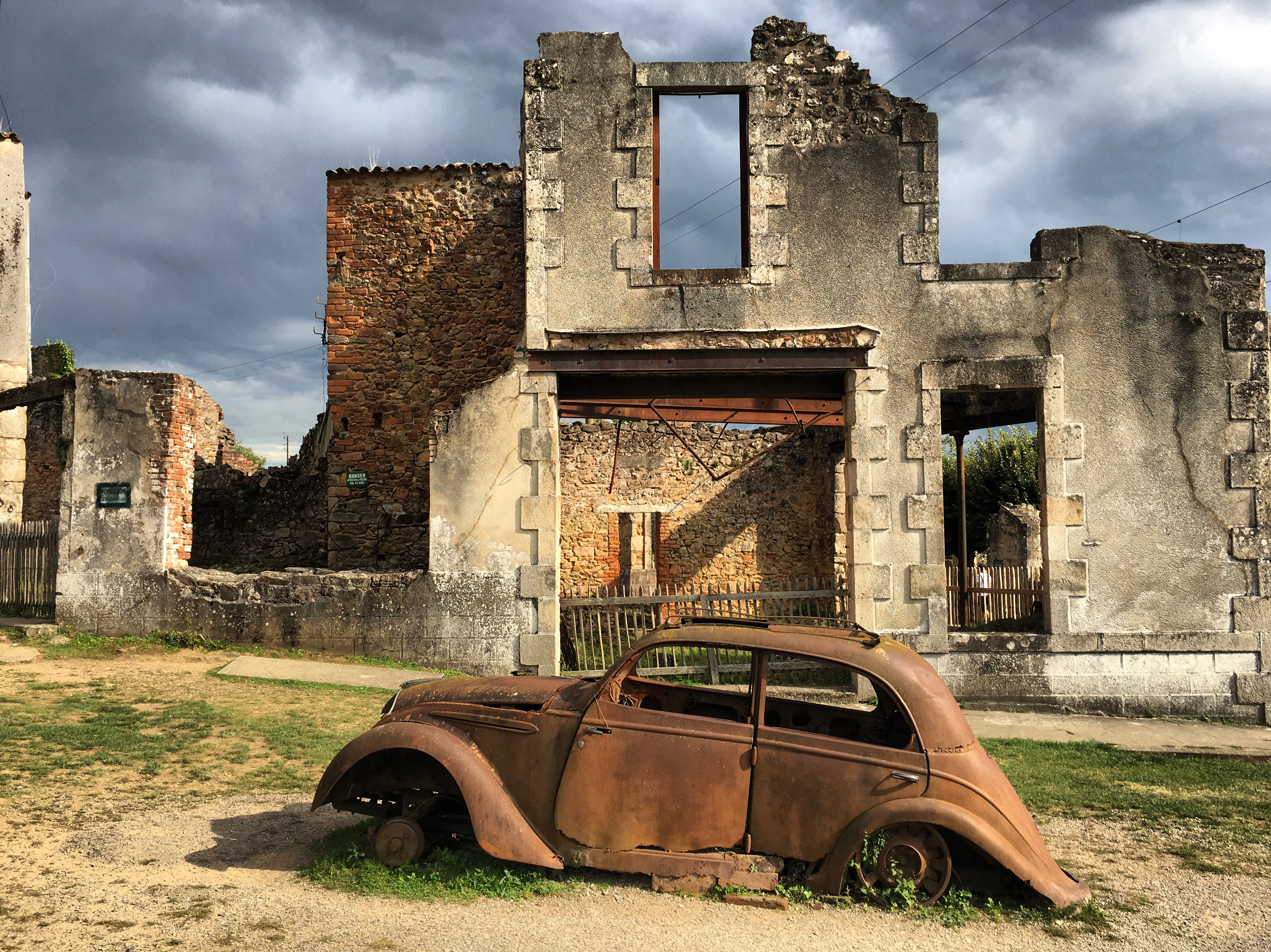
Oradour-sur-Glane, France, has remained unchanged since the German massacre of its residents in 1944

A ghost town, deserted city, extinct town, or abandoned city is an abandoned or largely depopulated human settlement that usually contains substantial, visible remaining buildings and infrastructure, such as roads. A town often becomes a ghost town because the economic activity that supported it (usually industrial or agricultural) has failed or ended for any reason (e.g. mining has exhausted a local ore deposit). The town may also have declined because of natural or human-caused disasters such as floods, prolonged droughts, government actions, war, pollution, or nuclear and radiation-related accidents and incidents. The term can sometimes refer to cities, towns, and neighbourhoods that, though still populated, are significantly less so than in past years; for example, those affected by high levels of unemployment and dereliction.

The definition of a ghost town is debated amongst writers. Some restrict the term to places deserted for purely economic reasons, while others require visible remains of buildings, and still others allow for a small remaining population. Common causes of abandonment include the exhaustion of natural resources such as minerals or timber, the rerouting of railways or roads, dam construction that isolates or floods a town, armed conflict, forced displacement, and environmental contamination. Epidemics, including the Black Death and the Spanish flu, have also depopulated communities, as has long-term exposure to hazardous materials such as asbestos and lead.

Ghost towns are found on every continent, including Antarctica. Africa and the Middle East have towns abandoned because of conflict and the collapse of empires of which they were a part. In Asia, settlements linked to Gulag labour camps were deserted after the camps closed, while in Europe, urbanisation has led to the emptying of rural villages across Bulgaria, Hungary, and Spain. The Americas contain thousands of former mining and railway towns, particularly in the western United States, British Columbia, and Chile's Atacama Desert. Australia and New Zealand have their own legacy of gold rush ghost towns.

A few ghost towns have been repopulated through heritage tourism, pilgrimage, or resettlement programmes. Walhalla, Victoria, Australia grew and then shrank correlative to gold mining operations but recently has had a tourism-driven revival. Foncebadón in Spain is slowly recovering thanks in large part to Christian pilgrims stopping there on their way to Santiago de Compostela. Some ghost towns that preserve period-specific architecture have become tourist attractions or filming locations: examples include Kolmanskop in Namibia, Craco in Italy, Pripyat in Ukraine, and Bodie in the United States.

== Definition ==
T. Lindsey Baker, author of Ghost Towns of Texas, defines a ghost town as "a town for which the reason for being no longer exists." Some writers restrict the term to settlements that were deserted because they were no longer economically viable, discounting those that were abandoned due to a natural or human-made disaster or other causes. Some believe that any settlement with visible tangible remains should not be called a ghost town; others say, conversely, that a ghost town should contain the tangible remains of buildings. Whether or not the settlement must be completely deserted or may contain a small population is also a matter for debate. Generally, though, the term is used in a looser sense, encompassing any and all of these definitions. American author Lambert Florin defined a ghost town as "a shadowy semblance of a former self."

== Reasons for abandonment ==
Factors leading to the abandonment of towns include depleted natural resources, economic activity shifting elsewhere, railroads and roads bypassing or no longer accessing the town, human intervention, disasters, massacres, wars, the shifting of politics or fall of empires, and volcanic eruptions. A town can also be abandoned if it is located within an exclusion zone due to natural or human-made causes.

=== Armed conflicts ===
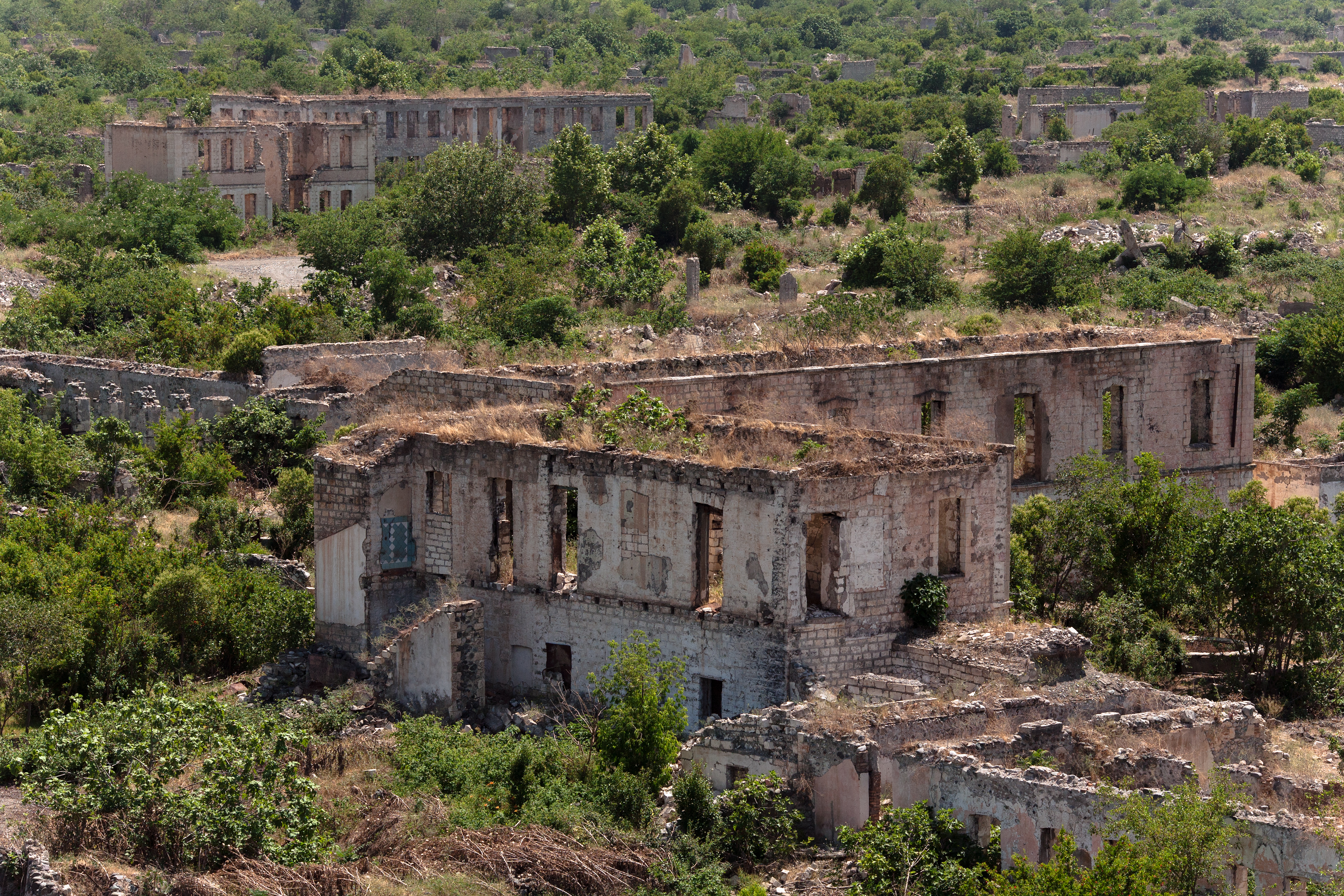
Nature slowly reclaiming the ruins in Aghdam (2010)

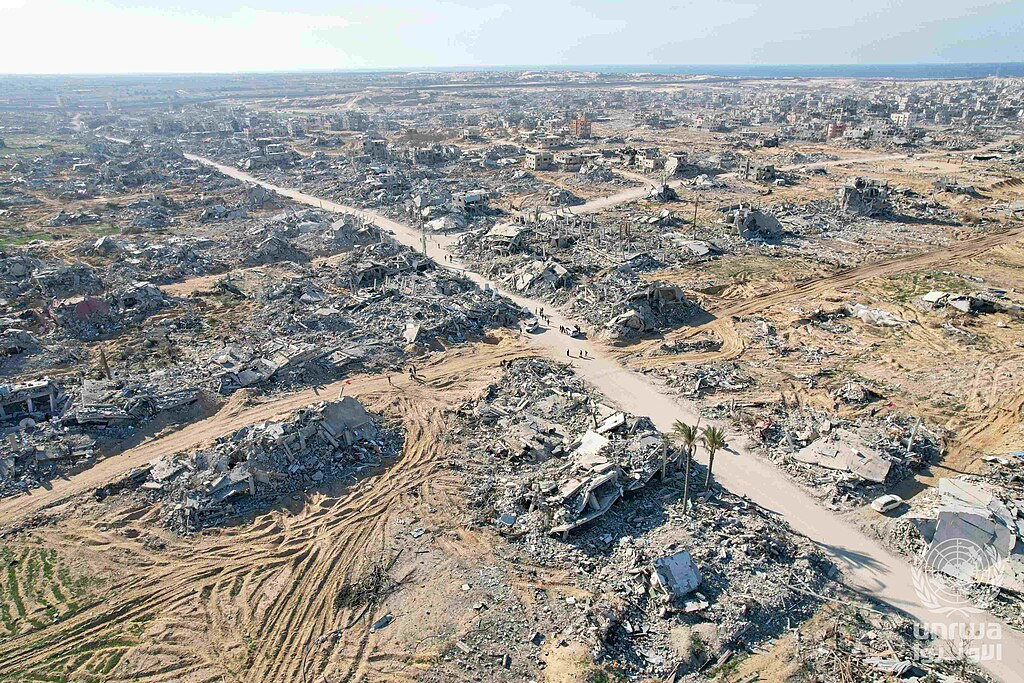
Rafah, destroyed (2025)

Some towns became deserted when their populations were massacred, deported, or expelled.

Examples include Kayaköy, an ancient Greek city abandoned in 1923 as a result of the population exchange between Greece and Turkey, and the original French village at Oradour-sur-Glane which was destroyed on 10 June 1944 when 642 of its 663 inhabitants were killed by a German Waffen-SS company. A new village was built after the war on a nearby site, and the ruins of the original have been maintained as a memorial.

The century-old Israeli–Palestinian conflict and Arab-Israeli conflict have caused a lot of ghost towns as well. In Palestine, the Old City of Hebron has been divided into H1, under Palestinian control, and H2, under Israeli military control since 1997. As a result of this division and the presence of Israeli settlers, the H2 area is subject to strict restrictions, shop closures, and checkpoints that have emptied the historic city centre. As for the Gaza Strip, following the Gaza war, most of its cities have been devastated by the Israeli military, Rafah and Khan Yunis in particular. Another Middle Eastern example is Quneitra, located in the Golan Heights: the city has been occupied by Israeli forces in 1967 and entirely destroyed before Israeli withdrawal in June 1974. The United Nations has condemned Israel for Quneitra's destruction, while Israel blamed Syria for not rebuilding the city.

Another example is Aghdam, a city in Azerbaijan. Armenian forces occupied Aghdam in July 1993 during the First Nagorno-Karabakh War. The heavy fighting forced the entire population to flee. Upon seizing the city, Armenian forces destroyed much of the town to discourage Azerbaijanis from returning. More damage occurred in the following decades when locals looted the abandoned town for building materials. Azerbaijan recaptured the district in November 2020 under a Russian-brokered ceasefire agreement.

In the 21st century, war and conflict continues to bring about the abandonment of human settlements. Examples include villages in Ukraine depopulated and largely destroyed during the Russian invasion such as Bakhmut and Avdiivka. During the ongoing Gaza war numerous Palestinian cities in Gaza have been entirely depopulated and razed. Rafah, with a pre-war population of 275,000 has been almost entirely destroyed and the population forcibly transferred.

=== Economic decline ===
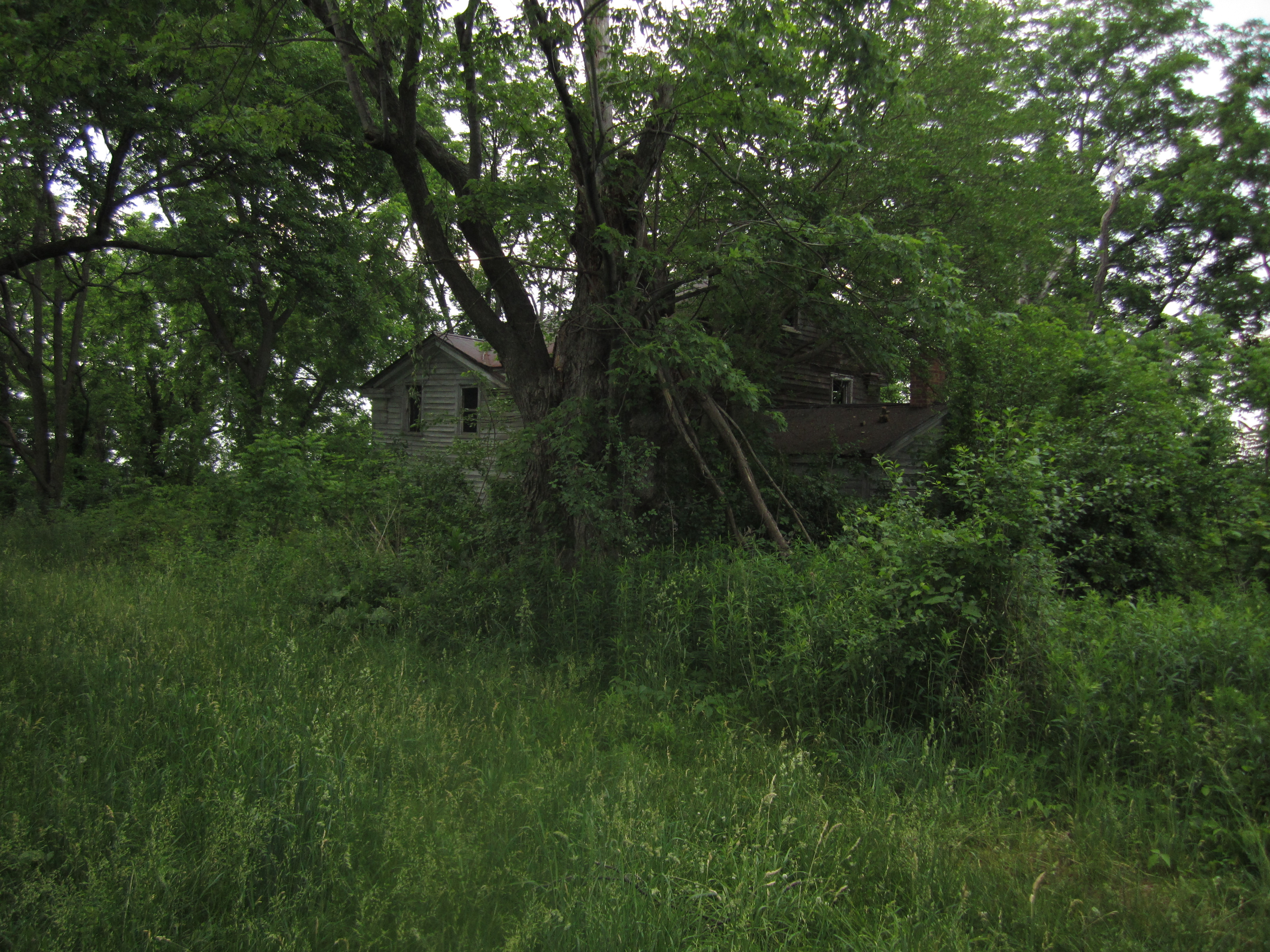
As farms industrialise, smaller farms are no longer economically viable, leading to rural decay.

Ghost towns may result when the single activity or resource that created a boomtown (e.g., nearby mine, mill or resort) is depleted or the resource economy undergoes a "bust" (e.g., catastrophic resource price collapse). A gold rush often brought intensive but short-lived economic activity to a remote village, only to leave a ghost town once the resource was depleted.

Boomtowns can often decrease in size as quickly as they grew. Sometimes all, or nearly all, of the population can desert the town, resulting in a ghost town. The dismantling of a boomtown can often occur on a planned basis. Mining companies sometimes will create a temporary company town to service a mine site, building all the accommodations, shops and services required, and then remove them once the resource has been extracted. Modular buildings can be used to facilitate the process.

In some cases, multiple factors may remove the economic basis for a community; some former mining towns on U.S. Route 66 suffered both mine closures when the resources were depleted and loss of highway traffic as US 66 was diverted from places like Oatman, Arizona, onto a more direct path. Mine and pulp mill closures have led to many ghost towns in British Columbia, Canada, including several relatively recent ones: Ocean Falls, which closed in 1973 after the pulp mill was decommissioned; Kitsault, whose molybdenum mine shut down after only 18 months in 1982; and Cassiar, whose asbestos mine operated from 1952 to 1992. Several communities in northern Saskatchewan were abandoned following the decline of the uranium mining industry, such as: Camsell Portage, Uranium City, Eldorado, and Gunnar.

In other cases, the reason for abandonment can arise from a town's intended economic function shifting to another, nearby place. This happened to Collingwood, Queensland, in Outback Australia when nearby Winton outperformed Collingwood as a regional centre for the livestock-raising industry. The railway reached Winton in 1899, linking it with the rest of Queensland, and Collingwood was a ghost town by the following year. More broadly across Australia, there has been a shift towards fly-in fly-out arrangements over building a company town in order to avoid the development of ghost towns once a mining resource has been fully extracted.

The Middle East (Southwest Asia) has many ghost towns and ruins that were created when the shifting of politics or the fall of empires caused capital cities to be socially or economically unviable, such as Ctesiphon.

The rise of real-estate speculation and the resulting possibility of real-estate bubbles (sometimes due to outright overbuilding by land developers) may also trigger the appearance of certain elements of a ghost town, as real-estate prices initially rise (whereupon affordable housing becomes less available) and then later fall for a variety of reasons that are often tied to economic cycles and/or marketing hubris. This has been observed in various countries, including Spain, China, the United States, and Canada, where housing is often used as an investment rather than for habitation.

=== Human intervention and infrastructure ===
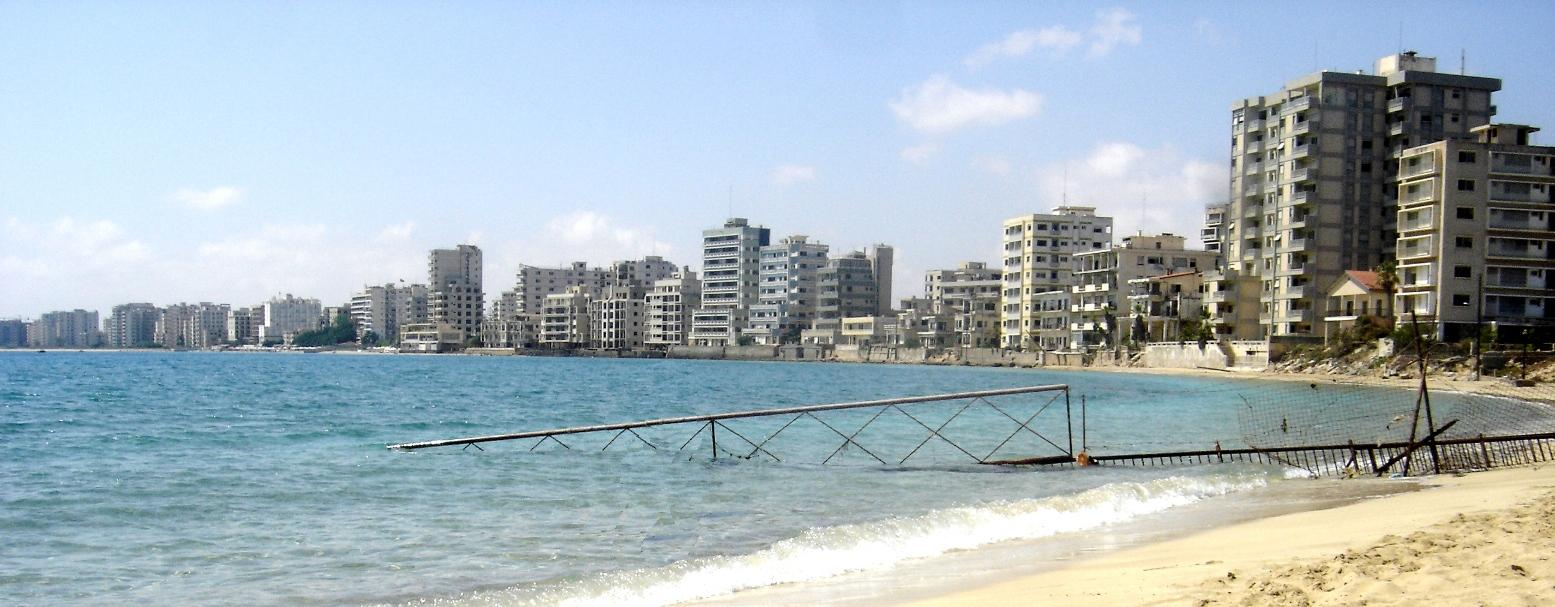
Prior to the Turkish invasion of Cyprus in 1974, Varosha, now falling into ruin, was a modern tourist area.

Railroads and roads bypassing or no longer reaching a town can also create a ghost town. This was the case in many of the ghost towns along Ontario's historic Opeongo Line and along U.S. Route 66 after motorists bypassed the latter on the faster-moving highways I-44 and I-40. Some ghost towns were founded along railways where steam trains would stop at periodic intervals for repairs or to take on water, but dieselisation or electrification negated the need for the trains to stop. Amboy, California, was part of one such series of villages along the Atlantic and Pacific Railroad across the Mojave Desert. In other cases, railroads replaced rivers or canals as the primary means of overland transport, causing the decline of towns that depended on river or canal traffic; one such town was Granville, Indiana, located on the Wabash and Erie Canal.

River rerouting is another factor, one example being the towns along the Aral Sea.

Ghost towns may be created when land is expropriated by a government, and residents are required to relocate. One example is the village of Tyneham in Dorset, England, acquired during World War II to build an artillery range.

A similar situation occurred in the U.S. when NASA acquired land to construct the John C. Stennis Space Center (SSC), a rocket testing facility in Hancock County, Mississippi (on the Mississippi side of the Pearl River, which is the Mississippi–Louisiana state line). This required NASA to acquire a large (approximately 34-square-mile or 88-square-kilometre) buffer zone because of the loud noise and potential dangers associated with testing such rockets. Five thinly populated rural Mississippi communities (Gainesville, Logtown, Napoleon, Santa Rosa, and Westonia), plus the northern portion of a sixth (Pearlington), along with 700 families in residence, had to be completely relocated away from the facility.

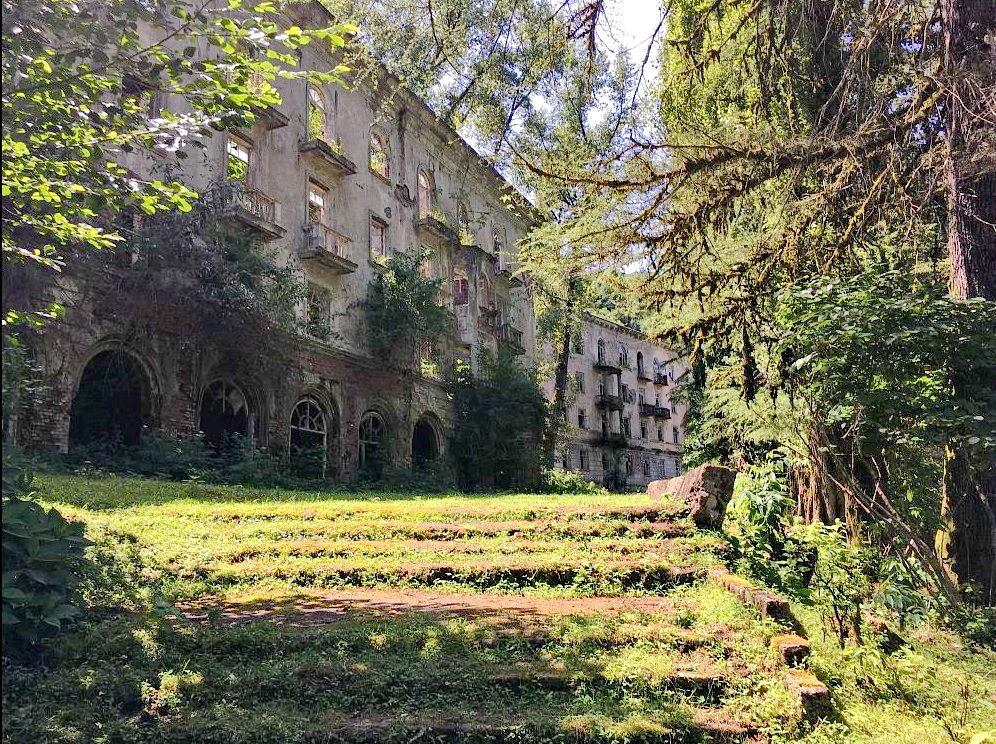
Akarmara, a mining town in Abkhazia/Georgia, was abandoned in the early 1990s due to the War in Abkhazia.

Sometimes the town might cease to officially exist, but the physical infrastructure remains. For instance, the facility itself still contains remnants of the five Mississippi communities abandoned for the construction of SSC. These include city streets, now overgrown with forest flora and fauna, and a one-room schoolhouse. Another example of infrastructure remaining is the former town of Weston, Illinois, that voted itself out of existence and turned the land over for construction of the Fermi National Accelerator Laboratory. Many houses and even a few barns remain, used for housing visiting scientists and storing maintenance equipment, while roads that used to cross through the site have been blocked off at the edges of the property with gatehouses or barricades to prevent unsupervised access.

==== Flooding by dams ====
The construction of dams has left ghost towns submerged. Examples include:

- Kensico, New York was replaced by the Kensico Reservoir.
- Loyston, Tennessee, U.S., was inundated by the creation of Norris Dam and reconstructed on nearby higher ground.
- St. Thomas, Nevada, U.S., flooded by up to 70 feet of water by Lake Mead following construction of the Hoover Dam.
- Stiltner, West Virginia, inundated by the creation of East Lynn Lake in 1969.
- The Lost Villages of Ontario, flooded by Saint Lawrence Seaway construction in 1958.
- Nether Hambleton and Middle Hambleton in Rutland, England, which were flooded to create Rutland Water.
- Ashopton and Derwent, England, flooded during the construction of the Ladybower Reservoir.
- The Tignes Dam flooded the village of Tignes in France, displacing 78 families.
- Mologa in Russia was flooded by the creation of Rybinsk reservoir between 1941 and 1947.
- Many ancient villages were abandoned during construction of the Three Gorges Dam in China, leading to the displacement of many rural people.
- In Guanacaste Province, Costa Rica, inhabitants of Arenal and Tronadora were forced to relocate in 1978 to make room for the human-made Lake Arenal.
- Old Adaminaby in New South Wales, Australia, was flooded by a dam of the Snowy River Scheme.
- Construction of the Aswan High Dam on the Nile River in Egypt submerged archaeological sites and ancient settlements, such as Buhen under Lake Nasser.
- Tehri was drowned after the construction of the Tehri Dam in the Indian state of Uttarakhand.
- Aceredo and five other villages in the region of Galicia, Spain, drowned by the construction of Alto Lindoso Dam downstream in Portugal in 1992 (later exposed after extreme drought conditions in early 2022).
- Capel Celyn, Gwynedd, Wales, was lost to the Tryweryn flooding of 1965. This was to create a reservoir, Llyn Celyn, in order to supply the English areas of Liverpool and Wirral with water for industry.
- Dana, Enfield, Greenwich, and Prescott, Massachusetts; four towns in the Swift River Valley that were flooded in 1938 to create the Quabbin Reservoir, a water supply for the growing city of Boston and the surrounding suburbs.

=== Disasters, actual and anticipated ===
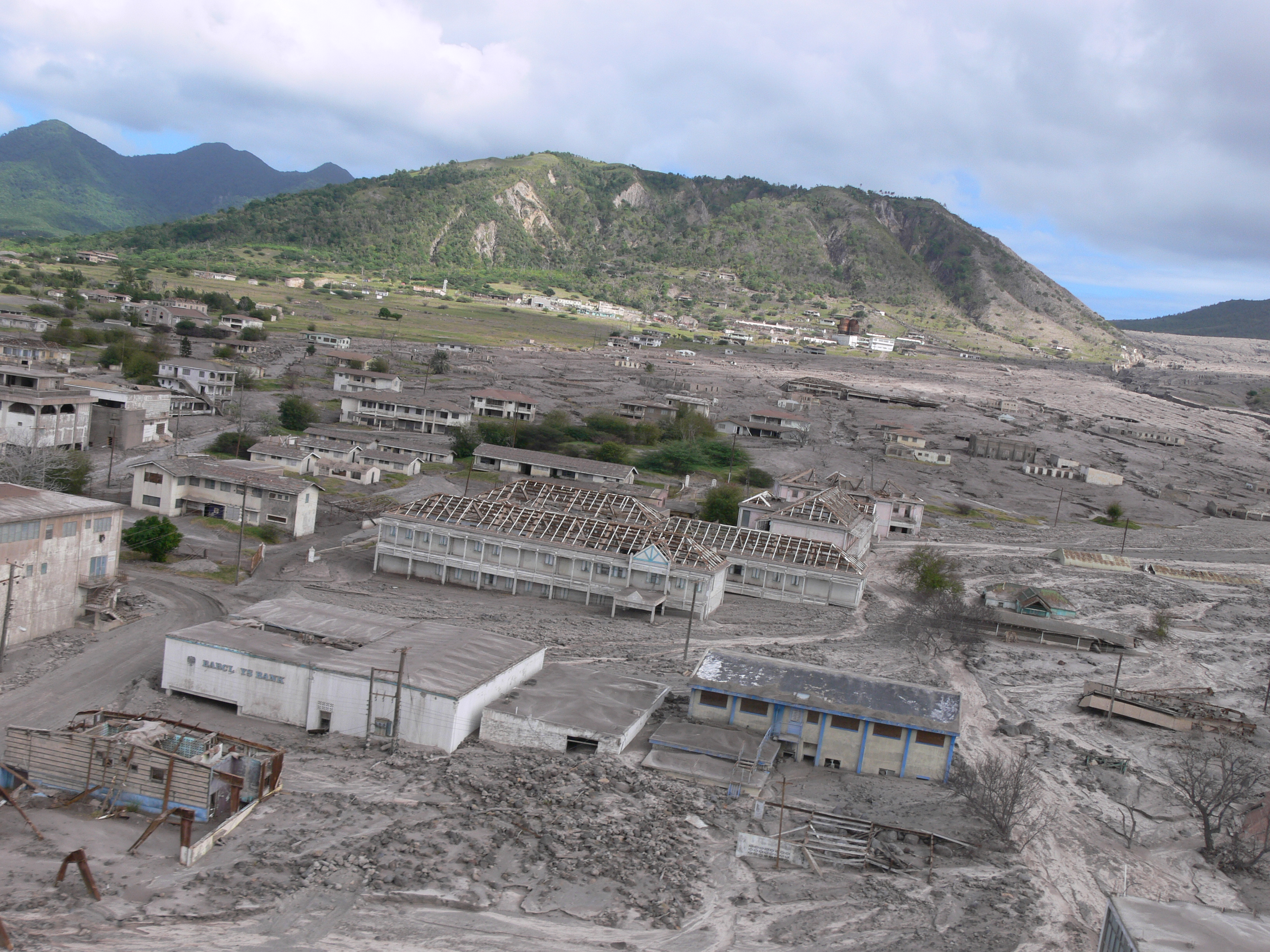
Plymouth, Montserrat is the only ghost town that is the capital of a modern political territory. It was rendered uninhabitable and evacuated in 1995 after being inundated with volcanic ash from the eruption of the Soufrière Hills Volcano.

Both natural and man-made disasters can lead to the creation of ghost towns. For example, after being flooded more than 30 times since their town was founded in 1845, residents of Pattonsburg, Missouri, decided to relocate after two floods in 1993. With government help, the whole town was rebuilt 3 miles or 5 km away.

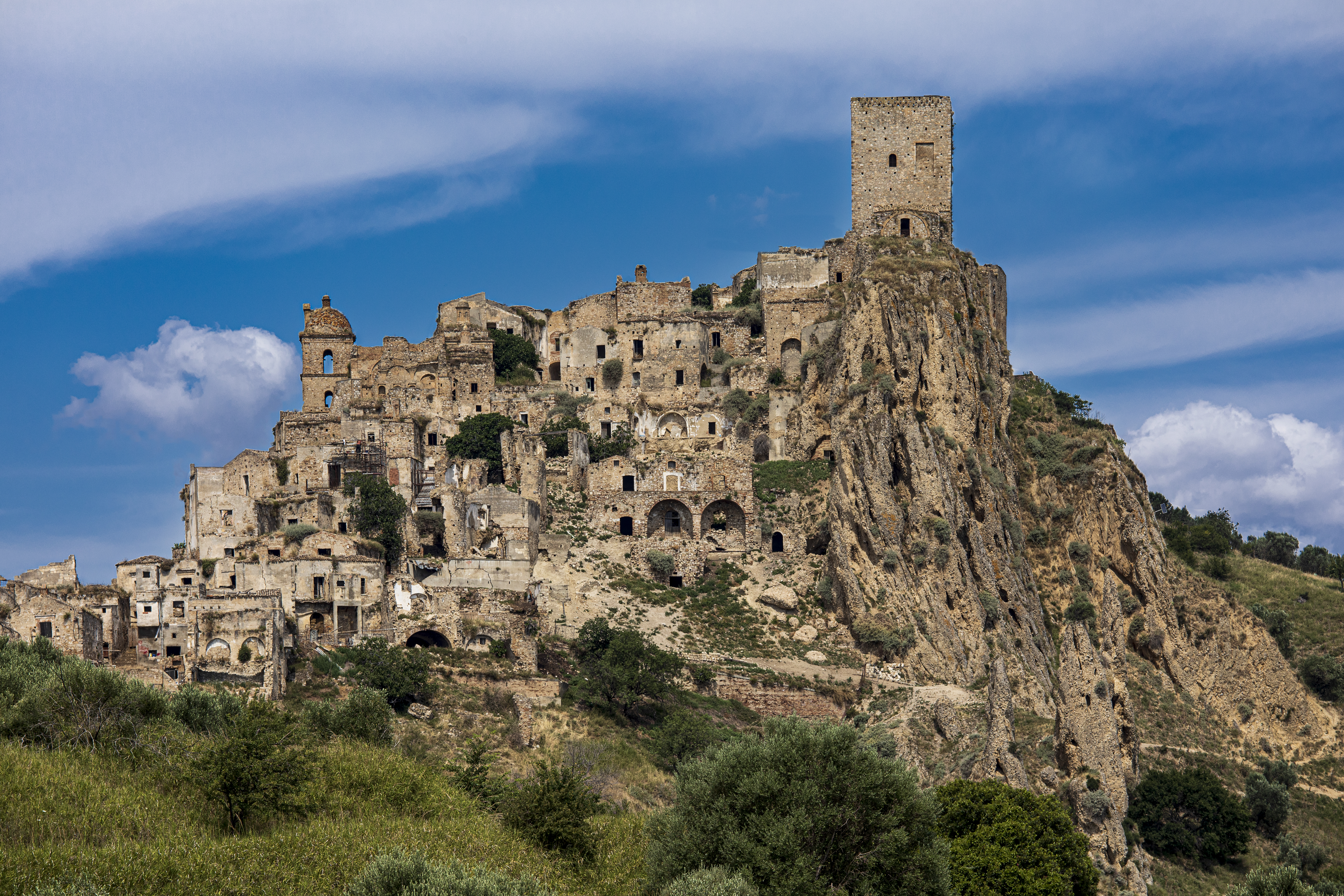
Craco, Italy, was abandoned due to a landslide in 1963. It has since become a popular film set.

Craco, a medieval village in the Italian region of Basilicata, was evacuated after a landslide in 1963. Nowadays it is a filming location for many movies, including The Passion of The Christ by Mel Gibson, Christ Stopped at Eboli by Francesco Rosi, The Nativity Story by Catherine Hardwicke and Quantum of Solace by Marc Forster.

In 1984, Centralia, Pennsylvania, was abandoned due to an uncontainable mine fire, which began in 1962 and still rages to this day; eventually the fire reached an abandoned mine underneath the nearby town of Byrnesville, which caused that mine to catch on fire too and forced the evacuation of that town as well.

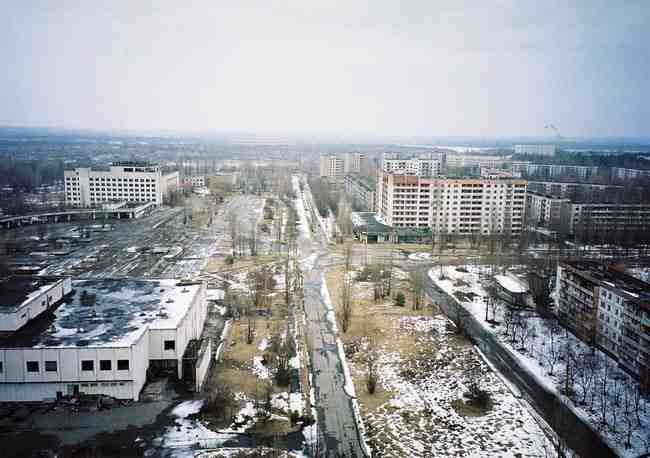
Pripyat, Ukraine, was abandoned after the Chernobyl disaster.

Ghost towns may also occasionally come into being due to an anticipated natural disaster – for example, the Canadian town of Lemieux, Ontario, was abandoned in 1991 after soil testing revealed that the community was built on an unstable bed of Leda clay. Two years after the last building in Lemieux was demolished, a landslide swept part of the former townsite into the South Nation River. Two decades earlier, the Canadian town of Saint-Jean-Vianney, Québec, also constructed on a Leda clay base, had been abandoned after a landslide on 4 May 1971, which swept away 41 homes, killing 31 people.

Following the Chernobyl disaster of 1986, dangerously high levels of nuclear contamination escaped into the surrounding area, and nearly 200 towns and villages in Ukraine and neighbouring Belarus were evacuated, including the cities of Pripyat and Chernobyl. The area was so contaminated that many of the evacuees were never permitted to return to their homes. Pripyat is the most famous of these abandoned towns; it was built for the workers of the Chernobyl Nuclear Power Plant and had a population of almost 50,000 at the time of the disaster.

==== Human health ====
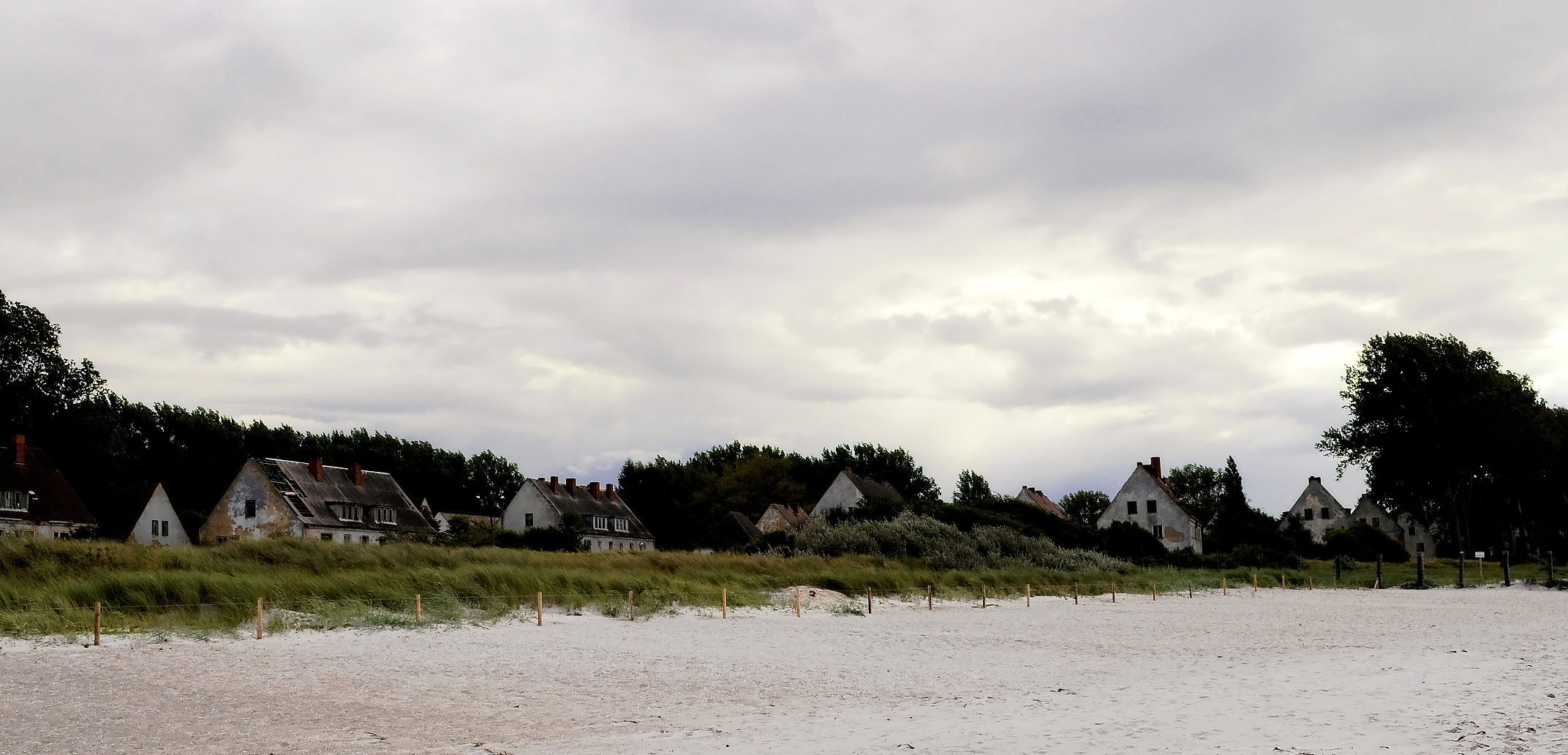
Rerik West, Germany. Turned into a restricted area after 1992 due to ammunition contamination from a nearby abandoned Soviet Army barracks.

Significant fatality rates from epidemics have produced ghost towns. Multiple hamlets in England were depopulated in the wake of the Black Death in the mid-14th century. Some places in eastern Arkansas were abandoned after more than 7,000 Arkansans died during the Spanish flu epidemic of 1918 and 1919. Several communities in Ireland, particularly in the west of the country, were wiped out due to the Great Famine in the latter half of the 19th century and the years of economic decline that followed.

Catastrophic environmental damage caused by long-term contamination can also create a ghost town. Some notable examples are Times Beach, Missouri, whose residents were exposed to a high level of dioxins, and Wittenoom, Western Australia, which was once Australia's largest source of blue asbestos, but was shut down in 1966 due to health concerns. Treece and Picher, twin communities straddling the Kansas–Oklahoma border, were once one of the United States' largest sources of zinc and lead, but over a century of unregulated disposal of mine tailings led to groundwater contamination and lead poisoning in the town's children, eventually resulting in a mandatory Environmental Protection Agency buyout and evacuation. Contamination due to ammunition caused by military use may also lead to the development of ghost towns. Tyneham, in Dorset, was requisitioned for military exercises during the Second World War, and remains unpopulated, being littered with unexploded munitions from regular shelling.

== Ghost town repopulation ==
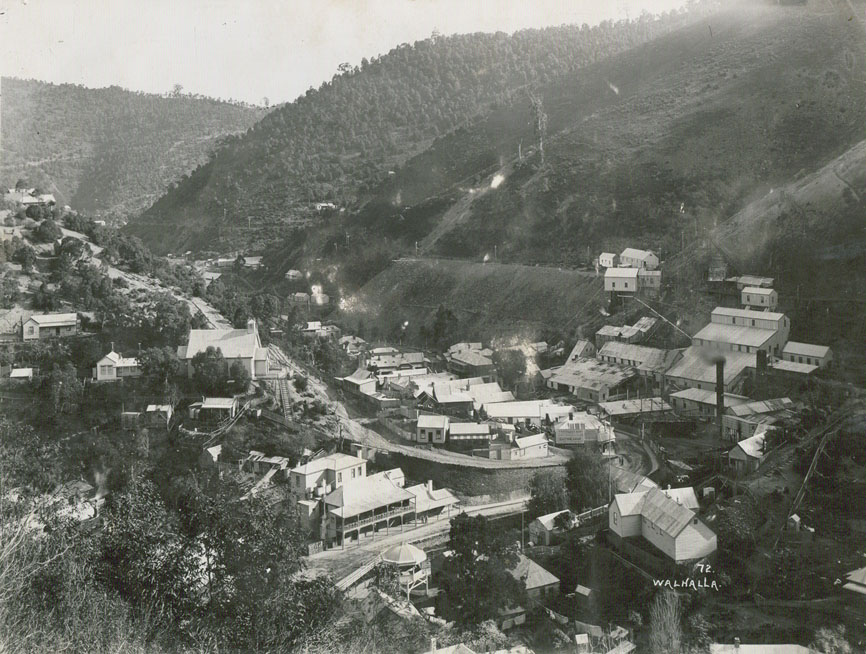
Walhalla township in 1910

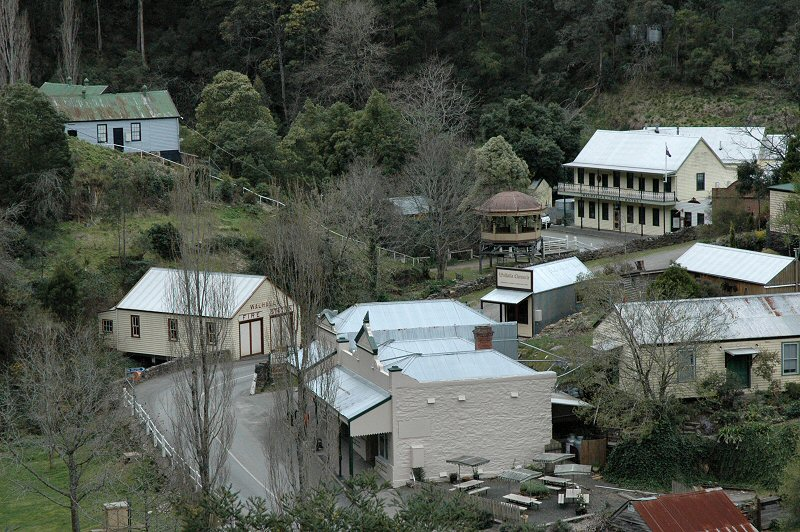
Part of Walhalla in 2004, showing a mix of original and reconstructed buildings

Walhalla, Victoria, was almost abandoned after being mined for gold, but is now becoming repopulated.

A few ghost towns have managed to get a second life, and this happens for a variety of reasons. One of these reasons is heritage tourism generating a new economy able to support residents.

For example, Walhalla, Victoria, Australia, became almost deserted after its gold mine ceased operation in 1914, but owing to its accessibility and proximity to other attractive locations, it has had a recent economic and holiday population surge. Another town, Sungai Lembing, Malaysia, which was almost deserted due to closure of a tin mine in 1986 was revived in 2001 and has become a tourist destination since then.

Foncebadón, a village in León, Spain, that was mostly abandoned and only inhabited by a mother and son, is slowly being revived owing to the ever-increasing stream of pilgrims on the road to Santiago de Compostela.

Some ghost towns (e.g. Riace, Muñotello) are being repopulated by refugees and homeless people. In Riace, this was accomplished by a scheme funded by the Italian government which offers the housing to refugees and in Muñotello it was accomplished through an NGO (Madrina Foundation).

In Algeria, many cities became hamlets after the end of Late Antiquity. They were revived with shifts in population during and after French colonisation of Algeria. Oran, currently the nation's second-largest city with 1 million people, was a village of only a few thousand people before colonisation.

Alexandria, the second-largest city of Egypt, was a flourishing city in the ancient era but declined during the Middle Ages. It underwent a dramatic revival during the 19th century; from a population of 5,000 in 1806, it grew into a city of more than 200,000 inhabitants by 1882, and is now home to more than four million people.

== Around the world ==
=== Africa ===
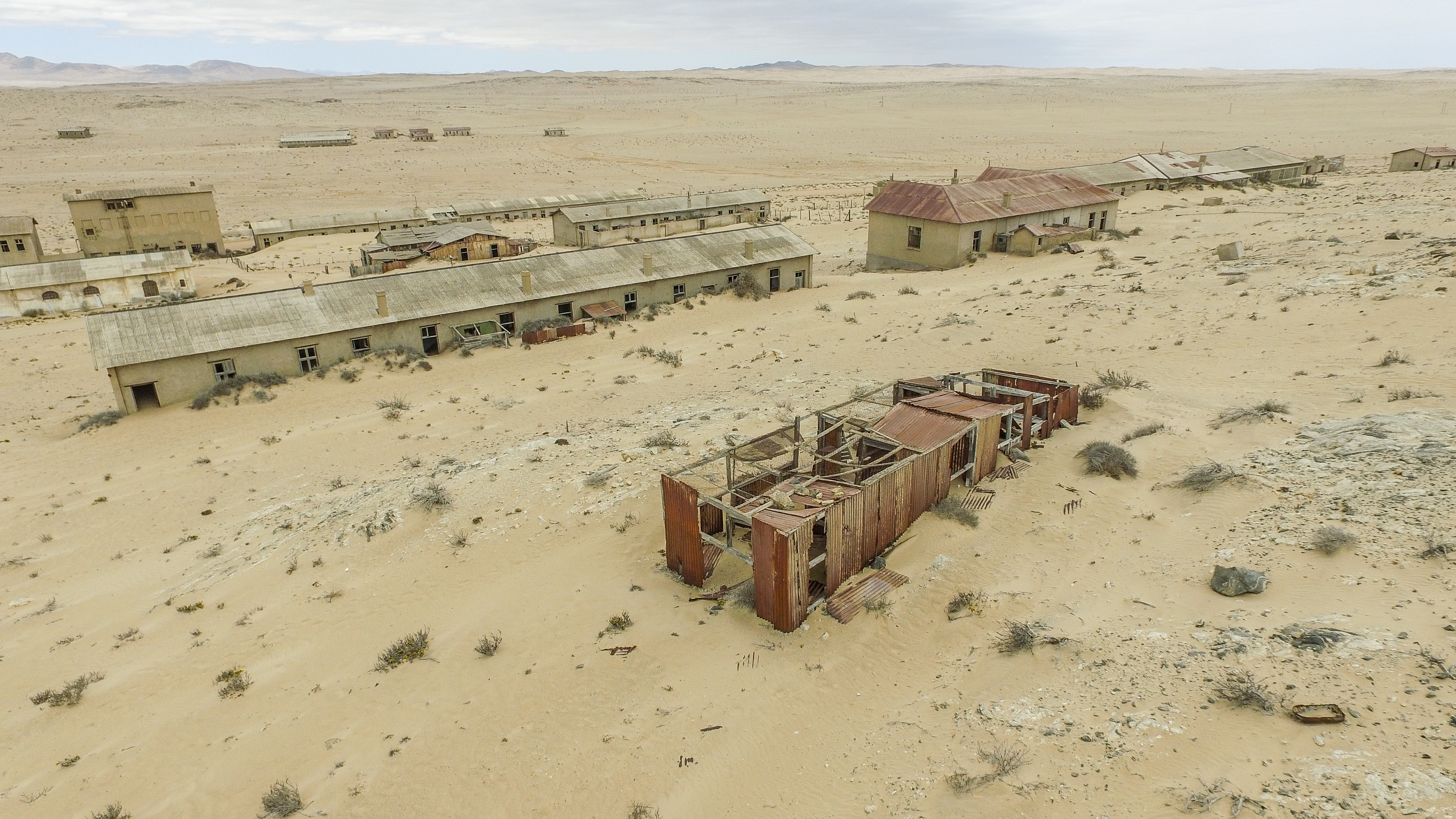
Kolmanskop, Namibia (2016); a ghost town since 1956

Wars and rebellions in some African countries have left many towns and villages deserted. Since 2003, when President François Bozizé came to power, thousands of citizens of the Central African Republic have been forced to flee their homes as a result of the escalating conflict between armed rebels and government troops. Villages accused of supporting the rebels, such as Beogombo Deux near Paoua, are ransacked by government soldiers. Those who are not killed have no choice but to escape to refugee camps. The instability in the region also leaves organised and well-equipped bandits free to terrorise the populace, often leaving villages abandoned in their wake. Elsewhere in Africa, the town of Lukangol was burnt to the ground during tribal clashes in South Sudan. Before its destruction, the town had a population of 20,000. The Libyan town of Tawergha had a population of around 25,000 before it was abandoned during the 2011 civil war, and it has remained empty since. As of January 2026, El Fasher, the de-facto capital city of Darfur, was largely abandoned, described by UN officials as a "crime scene".

Many of the ghost towns in mineral-rich Africa are former mining towns. Shortly after the start of the 1908 diamond rush in German South-West Africa, now known as Namibia, the German Imperial government claimed sole mining rights by creating the Sperrgebiet ("forbidden zone"), effectively criminalising new settlement. The small mining towns of this area, among them Pomona, Elizabeth Bay and Kolmanskop, were exempt from this ban, but the denial of new land claims soon rendered all of them ghost towns.

=== Asia ===
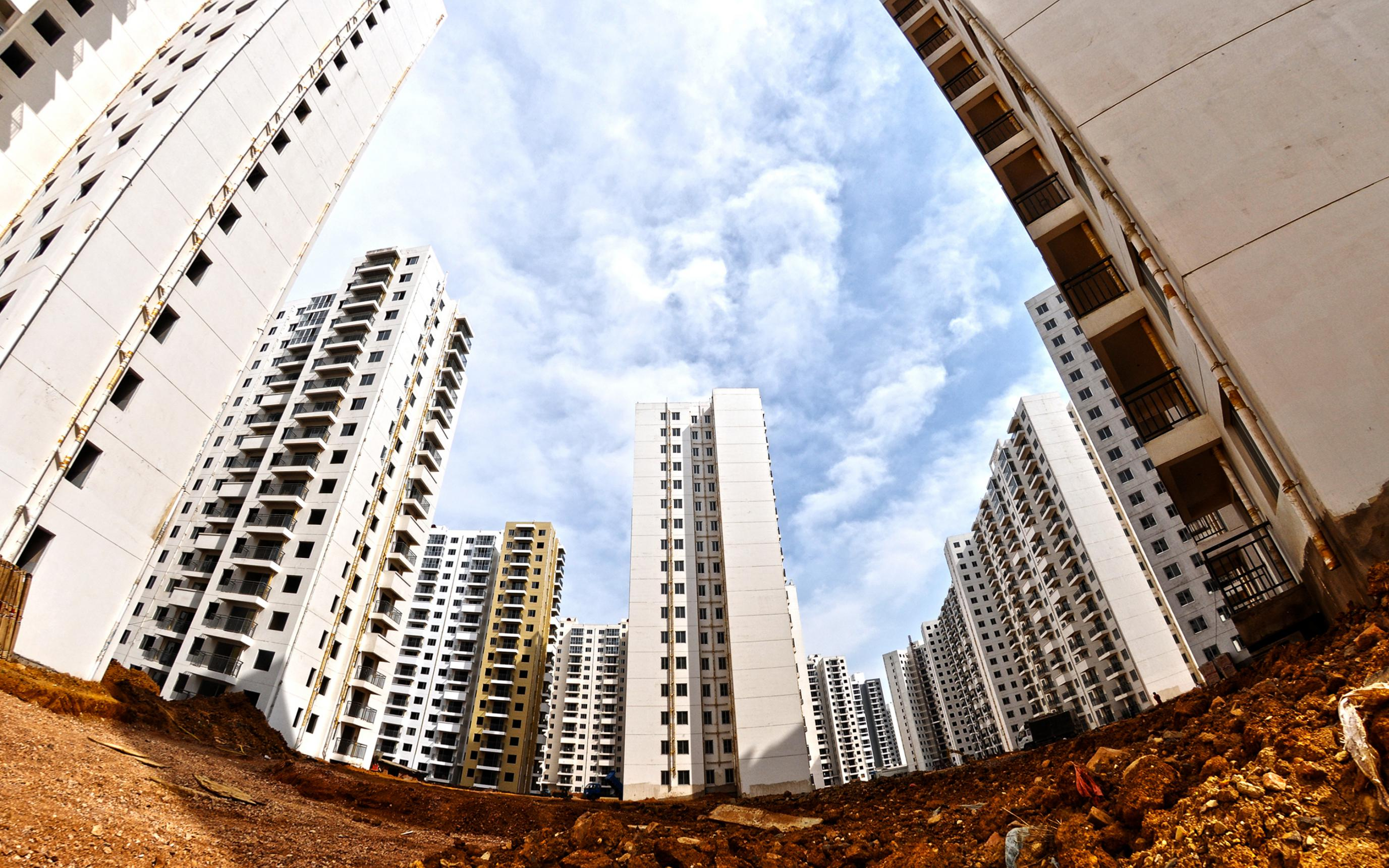
Unoccupied residential complexes in the Chenggong District, Kunming, China

The town of Dhanushkodi, India, is a ghost town. It was destroyed during the 1964 Rameswaram cyclone and remains uninhabited in the aftermath.

The Middle East is also home to several ghost towns. In Palestine, Hebron's Old City has been emptied by Israeli restrictions and checkpoints; and in the Gaza Strip, since the onset of the Gaza war, the cities of Rafah and Khan Yunis are now considered ghost towns. In Syria, the city of Quneitra, located in the Israeli-occupied Golan Heights, has been completely destroyed by the Israeli army in 1974 and a ghost town since then.

Many abandoned towns and settlements in the former Soviet Union were established near Gulag labour camps to supply necessary services. The 1950s saw the abandonment of most of these camps, which in turn led to the abandonment of the towns. One such town is located near the former Gulag camp called Butugychag (also called Lower Butugychag). Other towns were deserted due to deindustrialisation and the economic crises of the early 1990s attributed to post-Soviet conflicts—one example being Tkvarcheli in Georgia, a coal mining town that suffered a drastic population decline as a result of the War in Abkhazia in the early 1990s, and Aghdam, made ruined and uninhabited after the First Nagorno-Karabakh War.

Although in the 2010s Chinese ghost cities became a frequent feature of discourse regarding China's economy and urbanisation, underoccupied cities filled up. Writing in 2023, academic and former UK diplomat Kerry Brown described the idea of Chinese ghost cities as a popular bandwagon that was shown to be a myth.

The town of Namie, along with several other towns in Fukushima Prefecture, Japan, was temporarily evacuated as a result of the Fukushima Daiichi nuclear disaster following the 2011 Tohoku earthquake and tsunami. Following ongoing decontamination works, several portions of Namie have been fully reopened to residents, allowing reconstruction and renovation of the town's buildings to be undertaken and resettlement of the area to take place.

=== Europe ===
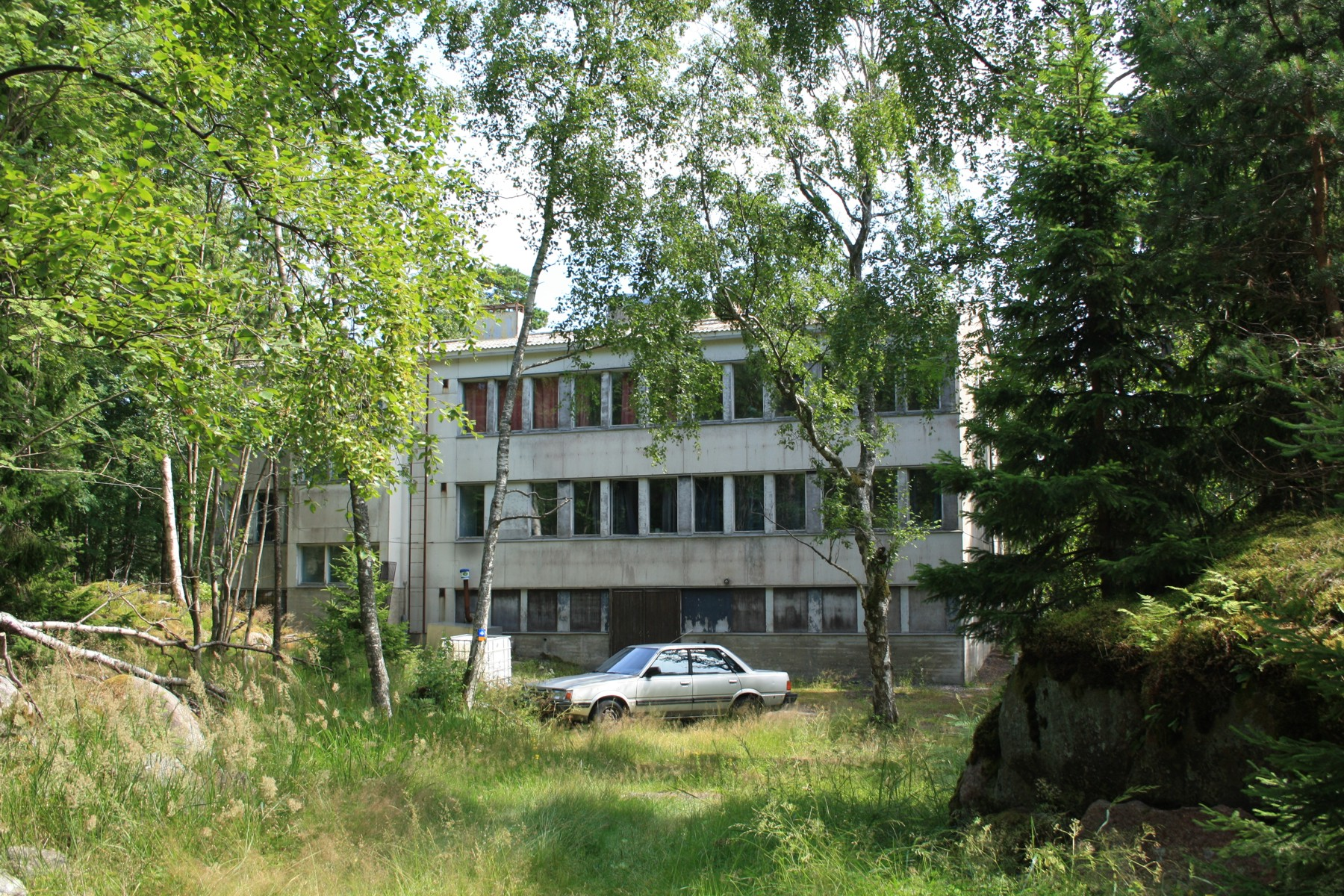
Abandoned mining building on the Jussarö island in Ekenäs, Raseborg, Finland

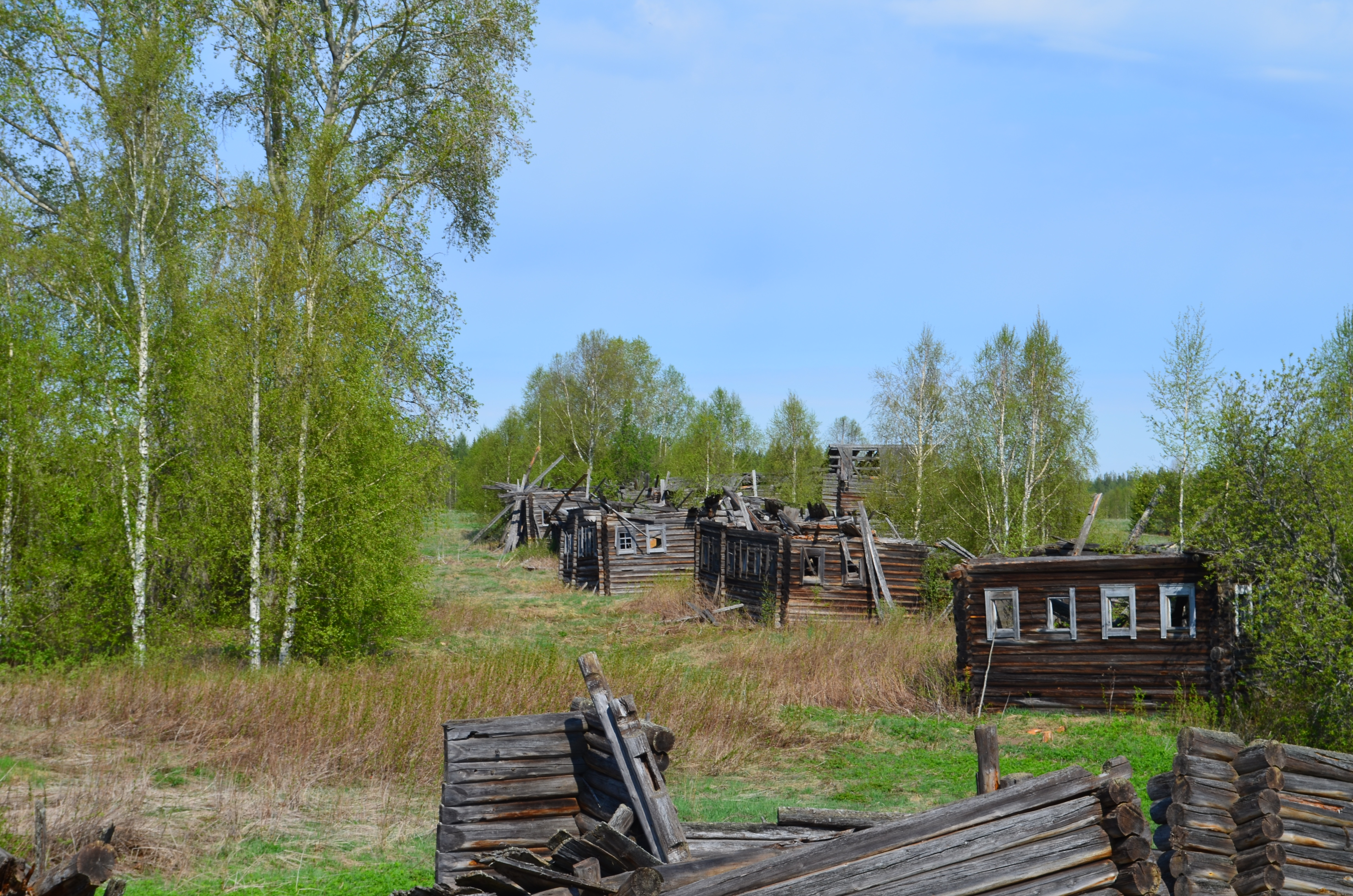
The forest occupies the territory of the village of Krivets, deserted by urbanisation. Arkhangelsk Oblast, Russia

Urbanization—the migration of a country's rural population into the cities—has left many European towns and villages deserted. An increasing number of settlements in Bulgaria are becoming ghost towns for this reason; at the time of the 2011 census, the country had 181 uninhabited settlements. In Hungary, dozens of villages are also threatened with abandonment. The first village officially declared as "dead" was Gyűrűfű in the late 1970s, but later it was repopulated as an eco-village. Some other depopulated villages were successfully saved as small rural resorts, such as Kán, Tornakápolna, Szanticska, Gorica, and Révfalu.

In Spain, large zones of the mountainous Iberian System and the Pyrenees have undergone heavy depopulation since the early 20th century, leaving a string of ghost towns in areas such as the Solana Valley. Traditional agricultural practices such as sheep and goat rearing, on which the mountain village economy was based, were not taken over by the local youth, especially after the lifestyle changes that swept over rural Spain during the second half of the 20th century. La Estrella, Teruel, is an 18th-century sanctuary village that became abandoned following mass rural flight.

Examples of ghost towns in Italy include the medieval village of Fabbriche di Careggine near Lago di Vagli, in the province of Lucca, in Tuscany, the deserted mountain village of Craco, located in Basilicata, which has served as a filming location, and the ghost village of Roveraia, in the municipality of Loro Ciuffenna, in province of Arezzo, situated near Pratovalle. The presence of the village is attested since the Middle Ages, when there was a tower. During World War II it was an important partisan base and it was abandoned between the 1960s and the 1980s, when the last family who lived here left the village. Two projects have been proposed for the recovery of the village: in 2011 the proposal of Movimento Libero Perseo "Roveraia eco-lab," based on sustainability, and in 2019 there was a proposal aiming to recover the village with a mix of functions called "Ecomuseum of Pratomagno."

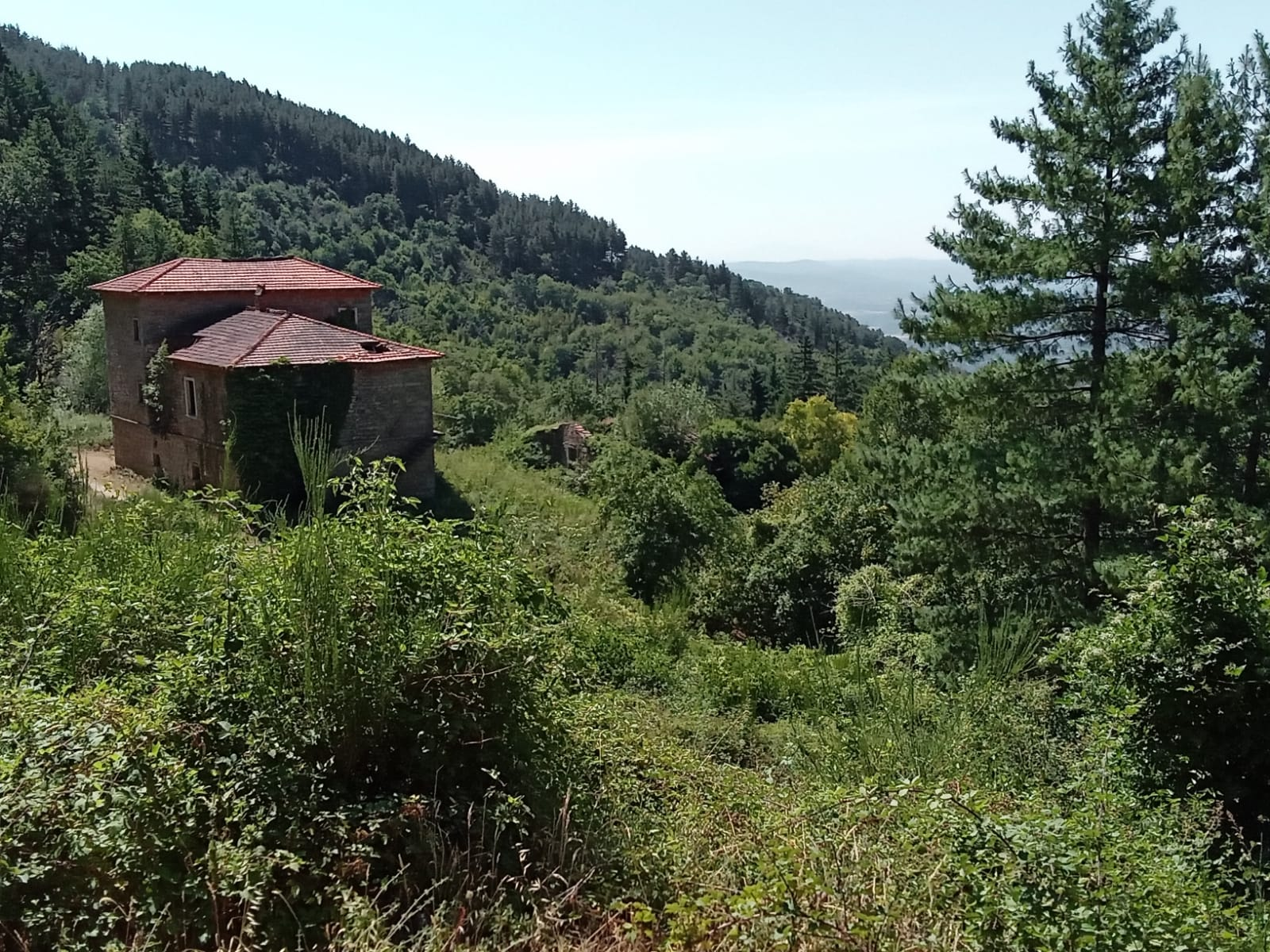
Ghost village of Roveraia

In the United Kingdom, thousands of villages were abandoned during the Middle Ages as a result of the Black Death, revolts, and enclosure, the process by which vast amounts of farmland became privately owned. Since there are rarely any visible remains of these settlements, they are not generally considered ghost towns; instead, they are referred to in archaeological circles as deserted medieval villages.

Sometimes, wars and genocide end a town's life. In 1944, occupying German Waffen-SS troops murdered almost the entire population of the French village Oradour-sur-Glane. A new settlement was built nearby after the war, but the old town was left depopulated on the orders of President Charles de Gaulle, as a permanent memorial. In Germany, numerous smaller towns and villages in the former eastern territories were completely destroyed in the last two years of the war. These territories later became part of Poland and the Soviet Union, and many of the smaller settlements were never rebuilt or repopulated, for example Kłomino (Westfalenhof), Pstrąże (Pstransse), and Janowa Góra (Johannesberg). Some villages in England were also abandoned during the war, but for different reasons. Imber, on Salisbury Plain, and several villages in the Stanford Battle Area, were commandeered by the War Office for use as training grounds for British and US troops. Although the occupation was intended to be a temporary measure, the residents were never allowed to return, and the villages have been used for military training ever since. Three miles or 5 km southeast of Imber is Copehill Down, a deserted village purpose-built for training in urban warfare.

Disasters have also played a part in the abandonment of settlements within Europe. After the Chernobyl disaster of 1986, Pripyat and Chernobyl were evacuated due to dangerous radiation levels; Pripyat remains completely abandoned, and Chernobyl has around 500 remaining inhabitants. Todoque in the Canary Islands, Spain, was severely affected during the 2021 Cumbre Vieja volcanic eruption. Hundreds of buildings were destroyed, and by 10 October new lava flows destroyed the remaining structures, leaving the town practically erased from the map.

An example in the UK of a ghost village that was abandoned before it was ever occupied is at Polphail, Argyll and Bute. The planned development of an oil rig construction facility nearby never materialised, and a village built to house the workers and their families became deserted the moment the building contractors finished their work.

=== North America ===
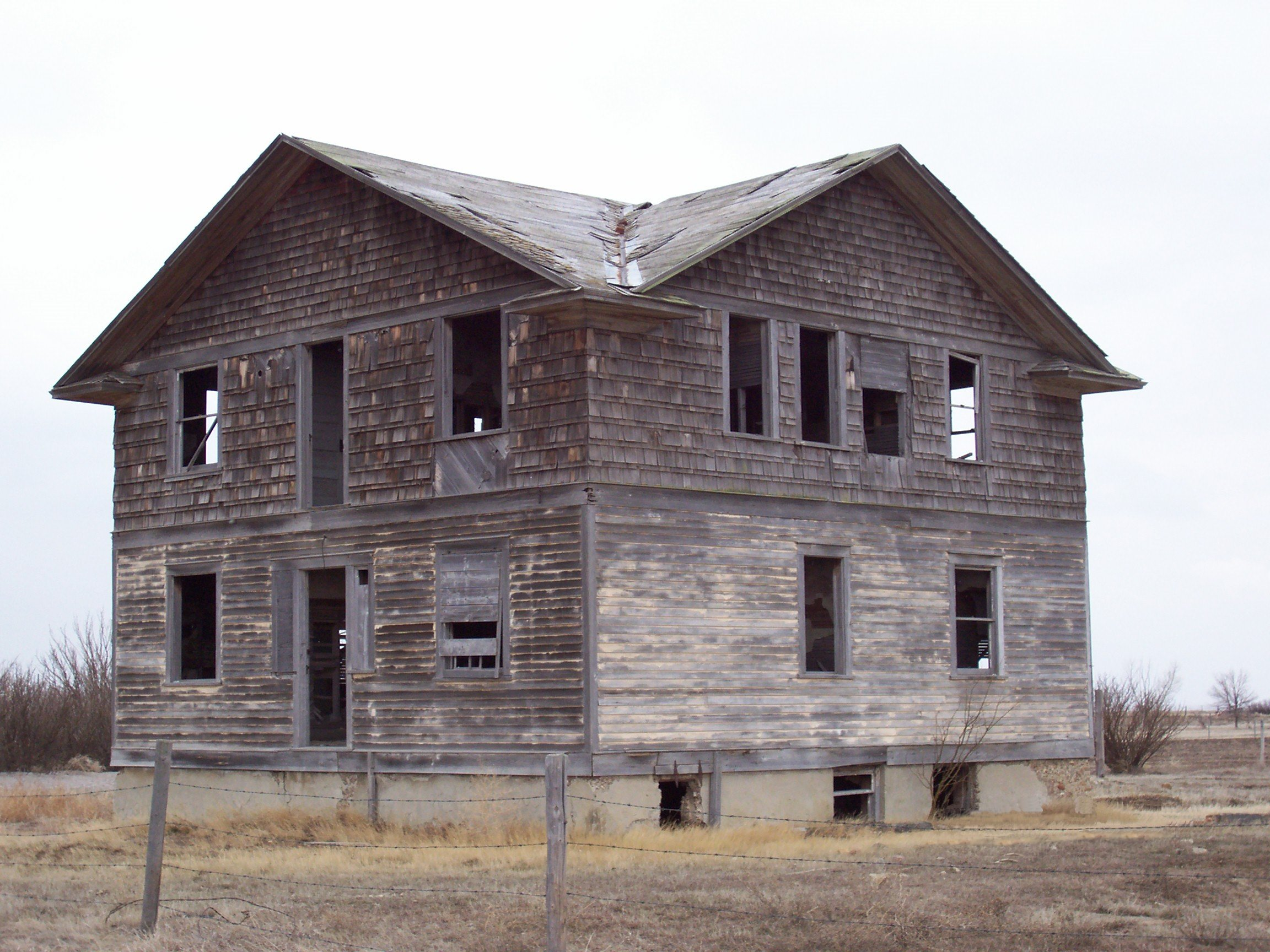
Robsart Hospital, one of many abandoned buildings in Robsart, Saskatchewan

==== Canada ====
Canada has several ghost towns in parts of British Columbia, Alberta, Ontario, Saskatchewan, Newfoundland and Labrador, and Quebec. Some were logging towns or dual mining and logging sites, often developed at the behest of the company. In Alberta and Saskatchewan, most ghost towns were once farming communities that have since died off due to the removal of the railway through the town or the bypass of a highway. The ghost towns in British Columbia were predominantly mining towns and prospecting camps, as well as canneries and, in one or two cases, large smelter and pulp mill towns. British Columbia has more ghost towns than any other jurisdiction on the North American continent, with more than 1,500 abandoned or semi-abandoned towns and localities. Among the most notable are Anyox, Kitsault, Ocean Falls, and Cassiar.

A large portion of ghost towns in Canada are former uranium mining communities, as the industry declined it left many communities, especially in the territories and northern regions of Manitoba and Saskatchewan. Among the most notable are Uranium City, Port Radium, Rayrock, Eldorado, Gunnar, and Camsell Portage.

Some ghost towns have revived their economies and populations due to historical and eco-tourism, such as Barkerville; once the largest town north of Kamloops, it is now a year-round provincial museum. In Quebec, Val-Jalbert is a well-known tourist ghost town; founded in 1901 around a mechanical pulp mill that became obsolete when paper mills began to break down wood fibre by chemical means, it was abandoned when the mill closed in 1927 and reopened as a park in 1960.

==== Mexico ====
A former mining town in Mexico, Real de Catorce, has been used as a backdrop for Hollywood movies such as The Mexican (2001) and Bandidas (2006).

==== United States ====
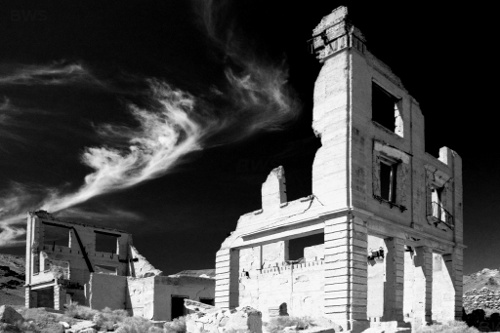
Cook Bank building in Rhyolite, Nevada, a gold mining town

Many ghost towns or abandoned communities exist in the American Great Plains, the rural areas of which have lost a third of their population since 1920. Thousands of communities in the northern plains states of Montana, Nebraska, North Dakota, and South Dakota became railroad ghost towns when a rail line failed to materialise. Hundreds of towns were abandoned as the Interstate highway system replaced the railroads as the favoured means of transportation. Ghost towns are common in mining or mill towns in all the western states and many eastern and southern states as well. Residents were compelled to leave in search of more productive areas when the resources that had created an employment boom in these towns are eventually exhausted.

Sometimes a ghost town consists of many abandoned buildings as in Bodie, California, or standing ruins as in Rhyolite, Nevada, while elsewhere only the foundations of former buildings remain as in Graysonia, Arkansas. Old mining camps that have lost most of their population at some stage of their history, such as Aspen, Deadwood, Oatman, Tombstone and Virginia City are sometimes referred to as ghost towns, although they are presently active towns and cities. Many U.S. ghost towns, such as South Pass City in Wyoming are listed on the National Register of Historic Places.

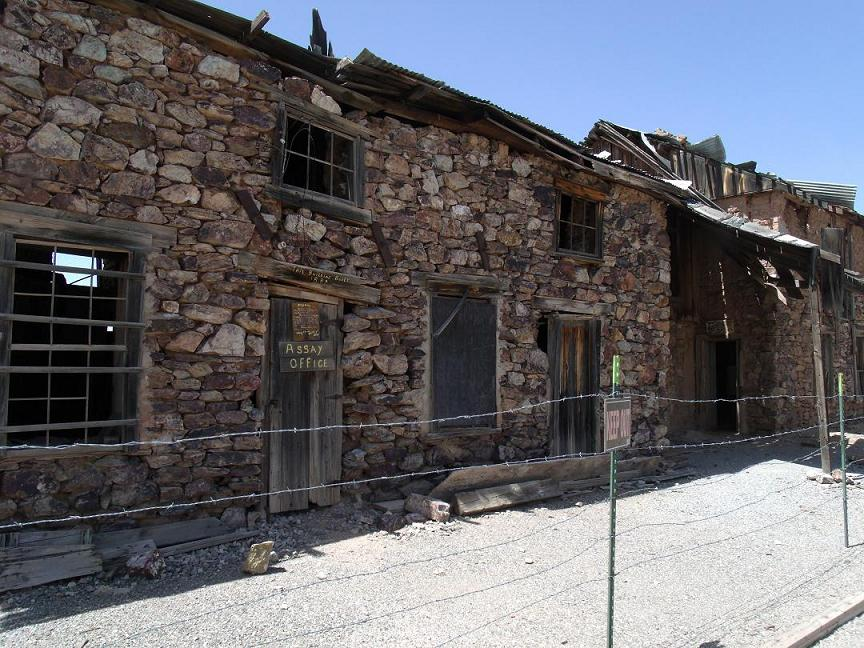
1884 assay office in Vulture City, Arizona, a gold mining town

Starting in 2002, an attempt to declare an official ghost town in California stalled when the adherents of the town of Bodie and those of Calico, in Southern California, could not agree on the most deserving settlement for the recognition. A compromise was eventually reached—Bodie was designated the official state gold rush ghost town in 2002, while Calico was named the official state silver rush ghost town in 2005.

=== South America ===
In the late 19th and early 20th centuries, a wave of European immigrants arrived in Brazil and settled in the cities, which offered jobs, education, and other opportunities that enabled newcomers to enter the middle class. Many also settled in the growing small towns along the expanding railway system. Since the 1930s, many rural workers have moved to the big cities. Other ghost towns were created in the aftermath of dinosaur fossil rushes.

In Colombia, a volcano erupted in 1985, and the city of Armero was engulfed by lahars, which killed approximately 23,000 people in total. Armero was never rebuilt (its inhabitants being diverted to nearby cities, and thus becoming a ghost town), but still stands today as "holy land," as dictated by Pope John Paul II.

In 1985, the town of Potosi, located east of the state of Táchira was flooded by the Venezuelan government to build a hydroelectric dam. It was later uncovered in 2010 by the weather phenomenon known as El Niño, which was a severe drought affecting the area.

Several ghost towns throughout South America were once mining camps or lumber mills, such as the many saltpetre mining camps that prospered in Chile from the end of the Saltpeter War until the invention of synthetic saltpetre during World War I. Some of these towns, such as the Humberstone and Santa Laura Saltpeter Works in the Atacama Desert, have been declared UNESCO World Heritage Sites.

=== Oceania ===
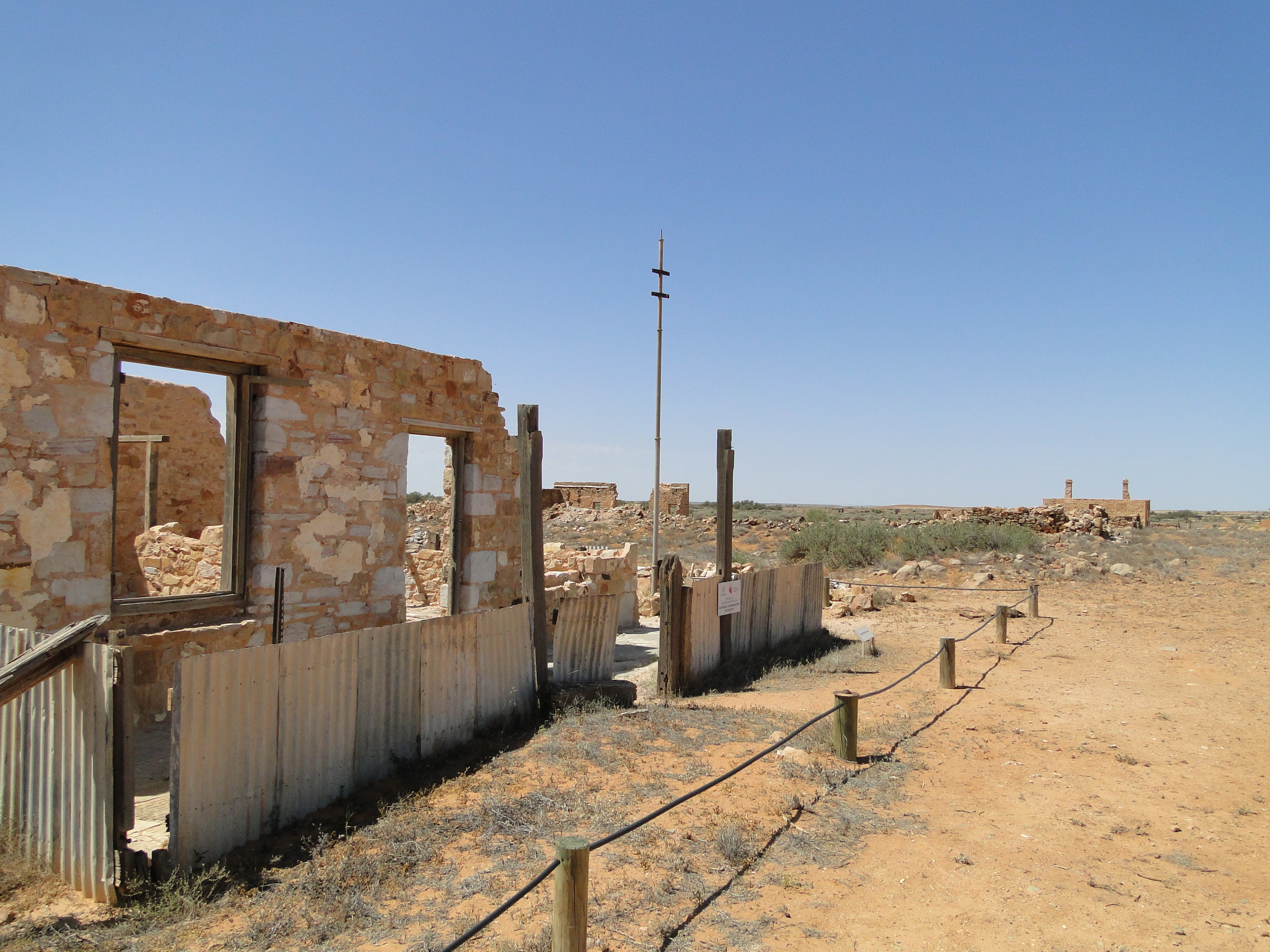
After many years of drought and dust storms, the town of Farina, South Australia, was abandoned.

The boom and bust of gold rushes and the mining of other ores have led to a number of ghost towns in both Australia and New Zealand. Other towns have become abandoned, whether due to natural disasters, the weather, or the drowning of valleys to increase the size of lakes.

In Australia, the Victoria gold rush led to numerous ghost towns (such as Cassilis and Moliagul), as did the hunt for gold in Western Australia (for example, the towns of Ora Banda and Kanowna). The mining of iron and other ores has also led to towns flourishing briefly before dwindling. The town of Wittenoom was abandoned and demolished due to the health hazards posed by asbestos mining in the area.

In New Zealand, the Otago gold rush similarly led to several ghost towns (such as Macetown). New Zealand's ghost towns also include numerous coal mining areas in the South Island's West Coast Region, including Denniston and Stockton. Natural disasters have also led to the loss of some towns, notably Te Wairoa, "The Buried Village," destroyed in the 1886 eruption of Mount Tarawera, and the Otago town of Kelso, abandoned after it was flooded repeatedly after heavy rainstorms. Early settlements on the rugged southwest coast of the South Island at Martins Bay and Port Craig were also abandoned, mainly due to the inhospitable terrain.

=== Antarctica ===
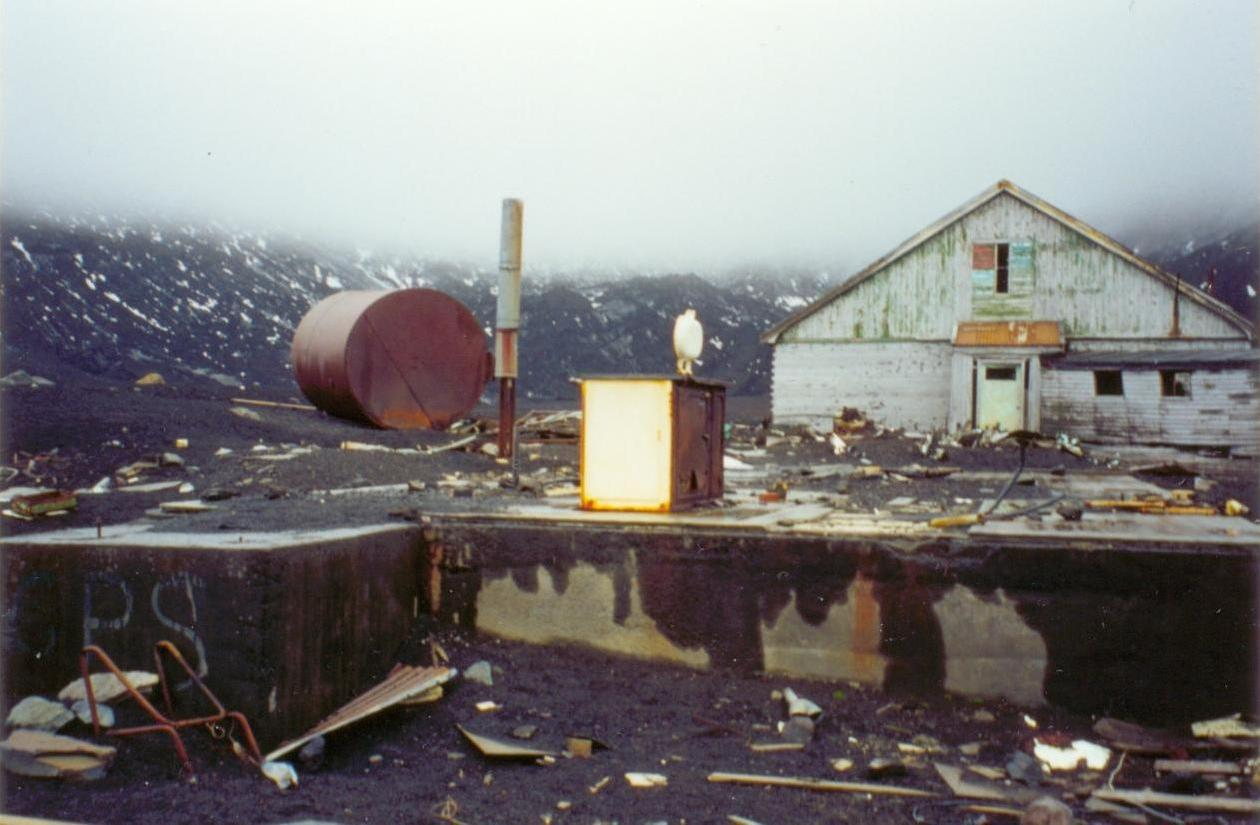
The derelict British base in Whalers Bay, Deception Island, destroyed by a volcanic eruption

The oldest ghost town in Antarctica is on Deception Island, where in 1906, a Norwegian-Chilean company set up a whaling station at Whalers Bay, which they used as a base for their factory ship, the Gobernador Bories. Other whaling operations followed suit, and by 1914 there were thirteen factory ships based there. The station ceased to be profitable during the Great Depression, and was abandoned in 1931. A volcanic eruption partially destroyed the station in 1969. There are also many abandoned scientific and military bases in Antarctica, especially in the Antarctic Peninsula.

The Antarctic island of South Georgia had several active whaling settlements during the first half of the 20th century, with a combined population exceeding 2,000 in some years. These included Grytviken (operating 1904–64), Leith Harbour (1909–65), Ocean Harbour (1909–20), Husvik (1910–60), Stromness (1912–61), and Prince Olav Harbour (1917–34). The abandoned settlements have become increasingly dilapidated and remain uninhabited nowadays except for the Museum curator's family at Grytviken. The jetty, the church, dwellings, and industrial buildings at Grytviken have recently been renovated by the South Georgian government, becoming a popular tourist destination. Some historical buildings in the other settlements are being restored as well.

== See also ==
- Abandoned mine
- Abandoned village
- Ghost ship
- Lost cities
- Modern ruins
- Old field (ecology)
- Passive rewilding
- Phantom settlement
- Population decline
- Potemkin village
- Unused highway
- Urban decay
- Urbicide
- Urban exploration
- Yellowcake boomtown

== Bibliography ==
- Baker, T. Lindsay (1991). Ghost Towns of Texas (2nd ed.). Norman: University of Oklahoma Press. ISBN 0-8061-2189-0.
- McIntyre, Tobi; Politis, Paul (September–October 2005). "Standing legacy: Ghost towns preserve the Ottawa Valley's rich history". Canadian Geographic. Archived from the original on 16 June 2016.
- Steinhilber, Berthold (2003). Ghost Towns of the American West. New York: Harry N. Abrams. ISBN 0-8109-4508-8.
- Wolle, Muriel Sibell (1993) [1977]. Timberline Tailings: Tales of Colorado's Ghost Towns and Mining Camps (1st ed.). Athens, Ohio: Swallow Press/Ohio University Press. ISBN 0-8040-0963-5.
- Wolle, Muriel Sibell (1991). Stampede to Timberline: The Ghost Towns and Mining Camps of Colorado (2nd ed.). Athens, OH: Swallow Press/Ohio University Press. ISBN 0-8040-0946-5.
