= Foncebadón =

- Village
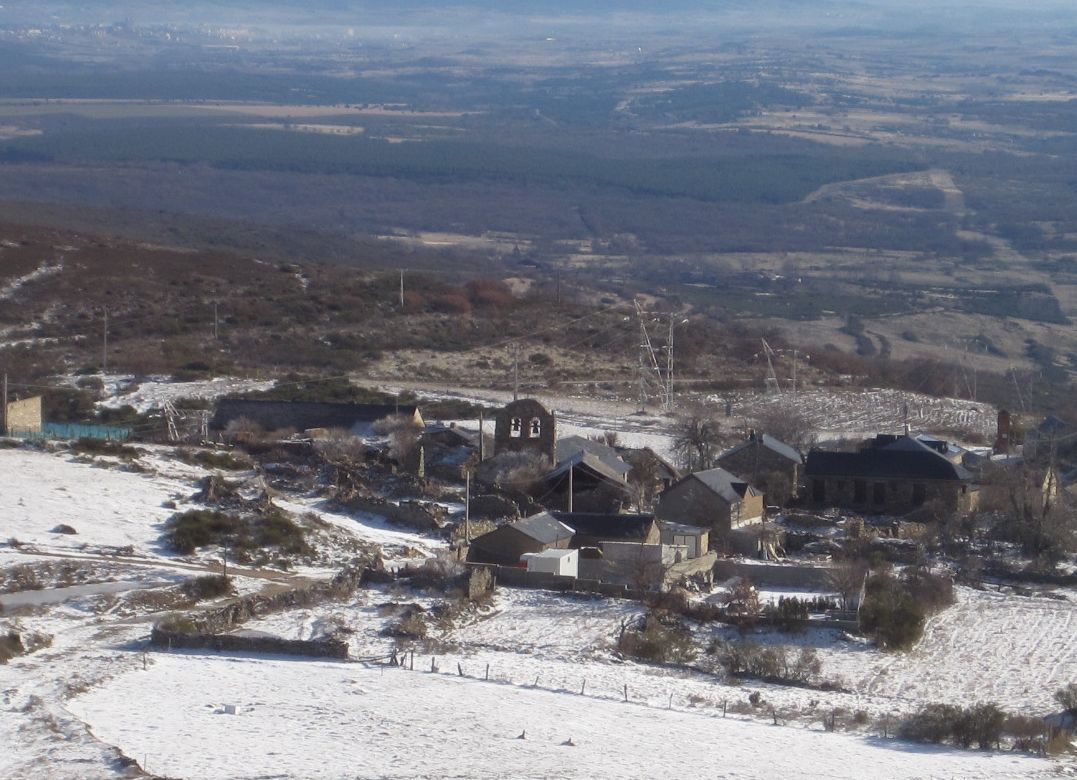
- View of Foncebadón in 2010

- Location within Castile and León Location within Spain
- Coordinates: 42°29′30″N 6°20′33″W
- Country: Spain
- Autonomous community: Castile and León
- Province: León
- Municipality: Santa Colomba de Somoza
- Elevation: 1,430 m (4,690 ft)
- Postal code: 24722
- Area code: 987

Foncebadón is a Spanish village in the municipality of Santa Colomba de Somoza, in the province of León.

The village, situated on a popular pilgrimage route called the Way of St. James, flourished during the Middle Ages, offering shelter and hospitality to the pilgrims who passed through on their way to Santiago de Compostela. According to local tradition, the village was granted a tax exemption in return for planting 800 stakes in the ground to mark the path. In the 10th century, Ramiro II of León convened a religious council in the village, and in the 11th or 12th century, the hermit Guacelmo established a hospital and a church.

Events such as the 16th-century Protestant Reformation and the early 19th-century Napoleonic Wars, along with the construction of new roads and railways, led to a decline in the number of pilgrims passing through the village. In the 1960s and 70s, many of Foncebadón's residents migrated to nearby cities in search of employment; by the 1990s, only two people, a mother and son, lived among the ruins of the once-thriving settlement.

In recent years, however, the Way of St. James has begun to attract thousands of modern-day pilgrims, and the new influx of travellers has inspired entrepreneurs to purchase and renovate some of the most emblematic buildings, such as the church and the hostel.

== See also ==
- Ghost town
