= Muñotello =

- municipality
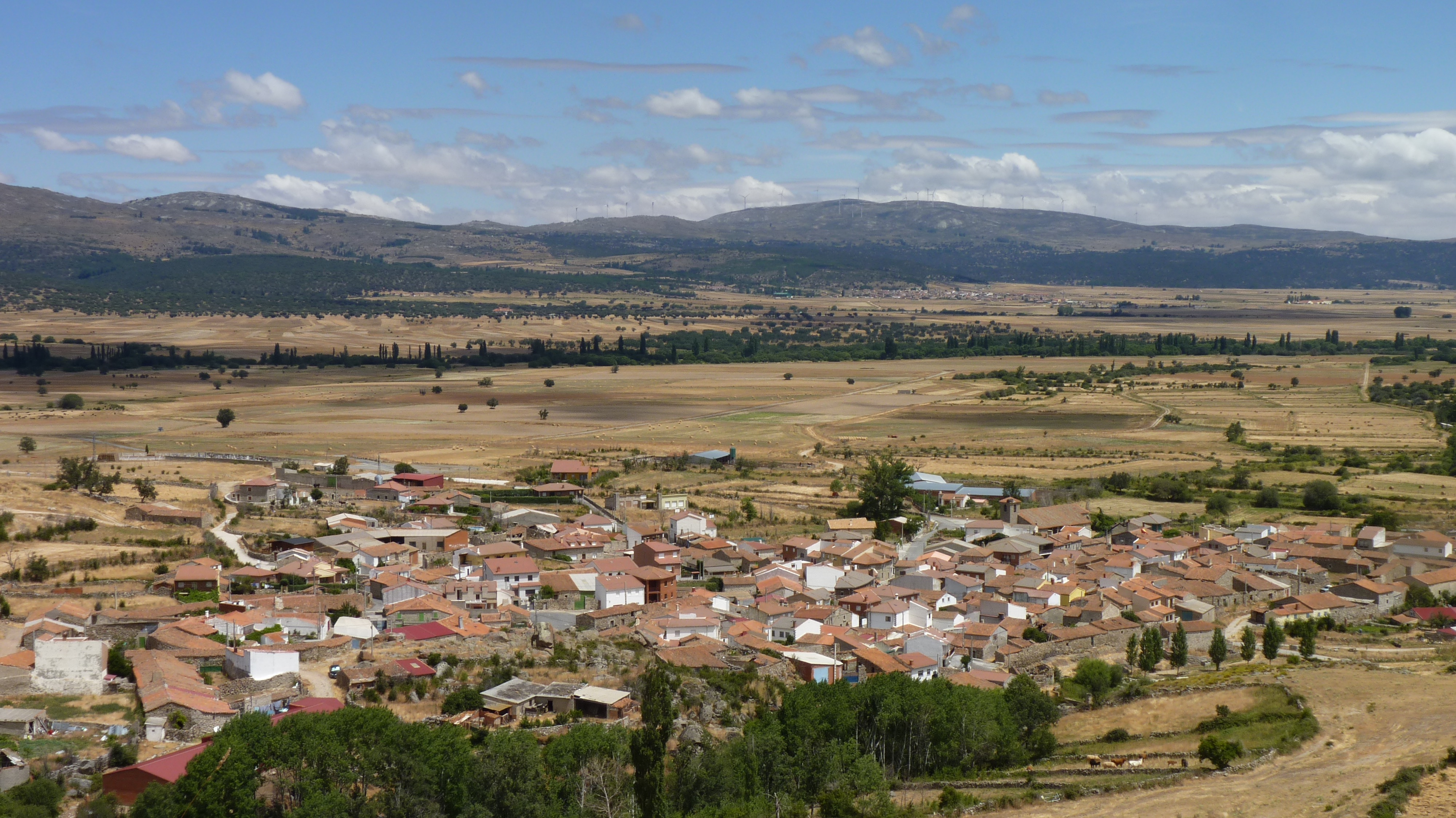
- Muñotello
- Flag Coat of arms
- Location in Spain. Muñotello (Spain)
- Coordinates: 40°32′35″N 5°02′27″W
- Country: Spain
- Autonomous community: Castile and León
- Province: Ávila
- Municipality: Muñotello

Area
  - Total: 19 km^{2} (7.3 sq mi)

Population (2025-01-01)
  - Total: 50
  - Density: 2.6/km^{2} (6.8/sq mi)
- Time zone: UTC+1 (CET)
  - Summer (DST): UTC+2 (CEST)
- Website: Official website

Muñotello is a municipality located in the province of Ávila, Castile and León, Spain.

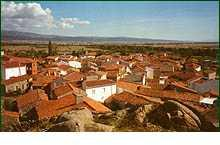
View of Muñotello.

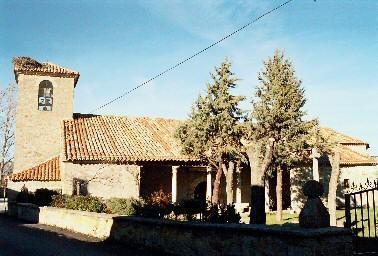
Muñotello church.

== Population ==
Historical population
Year	Pop.	±% p.a.
2023	51	—
2024	49	−3.92%
2025	50	+2.04%
Source: INE

== See also ==
- Ghost town repopulation
