= Lago di Vagli =

Lake in Tuscany, Italy

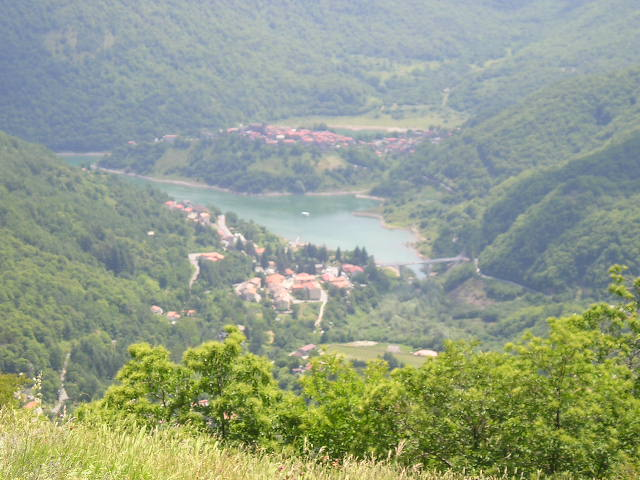

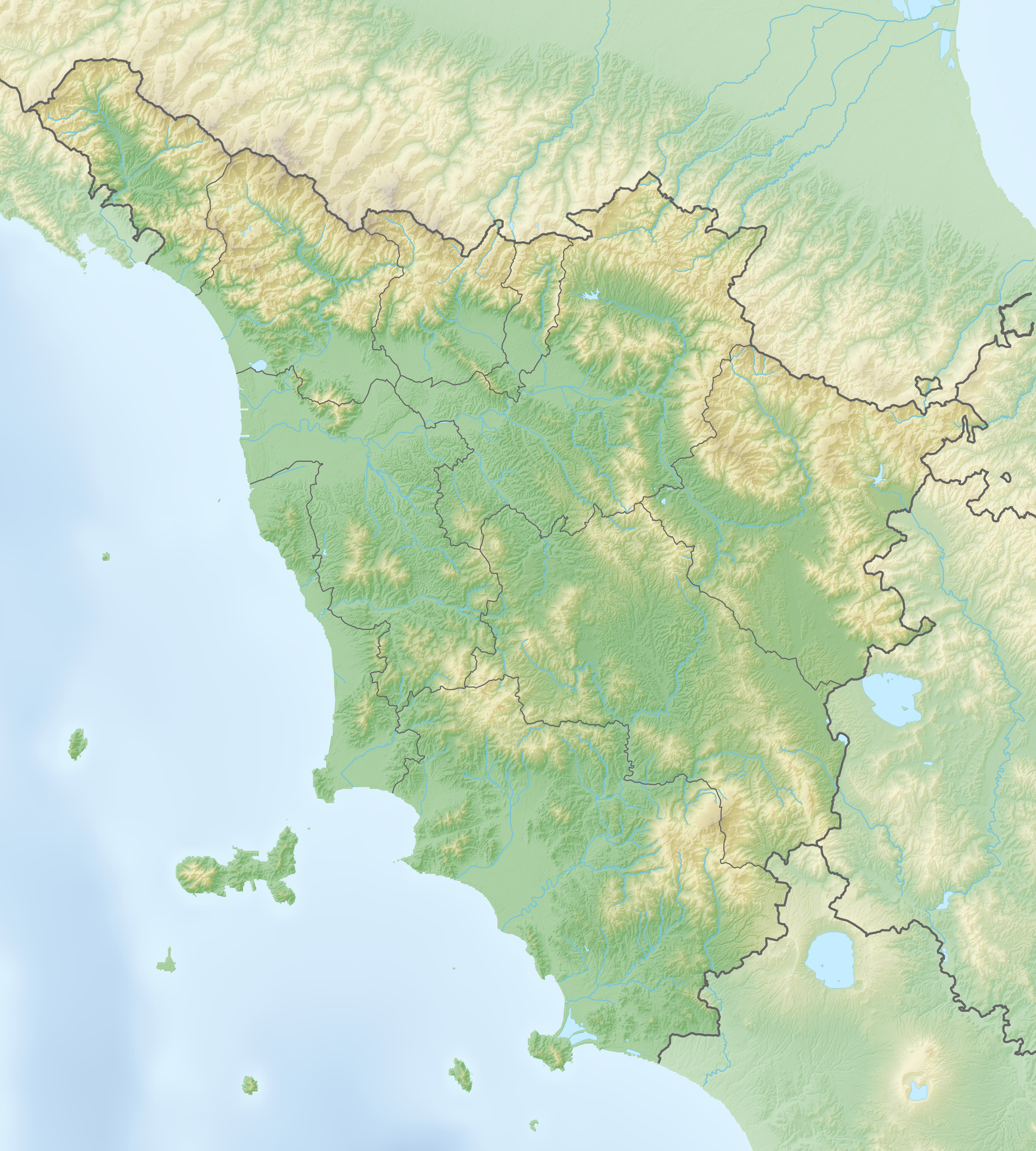
- Location within Tuscany
- Location: Province of Lucca, Tuscany
- Coordinates: 44°07′21″N 10°18′18″E
- Basin countries: Italy
- Surface elevation: 563 m (1,847 ft)

Lago di Vagli is a lake in the Province of Lucca, Tuscany, Italy. It was created in 1953 after the construction of a dam. It houses a depopulated village, the Fabbriche di Careggine, which becomes reachable when the basin is emptied for maintenance. The population was transferred in new residences built in the nearby Vagli Sotto.
