= Santa Colomba de Somoza =

- municipality
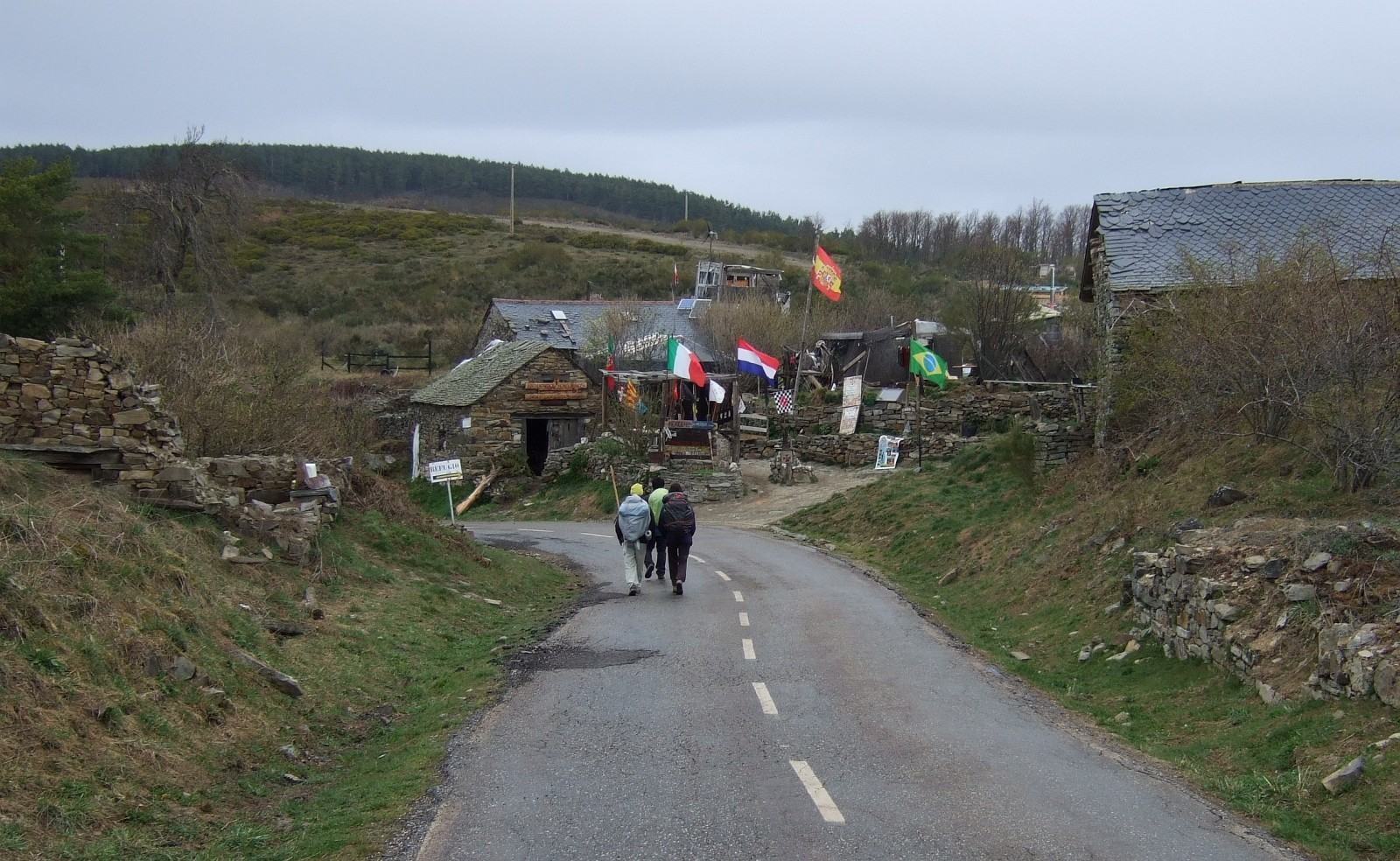

- Flag Coat of arms

- Location within Castile and León Location within Spain
- Coordinates: 42°26′40″N 6°14′39″W
- Country: Spain
- Autonomous community: Castile and León
- Province: León
- Municipality: Santa Colomba de Somoza

Area
  - Total: 179 km^{2} (69 sq mi)
- Elevation: 989 m (3,245 ft)

Population (2025-01-01)
  - Total: 472
  - Density: 2.64/km^{2} (6.83/sq mi)
- Time zone: UTC+1 (CET)
  - Summer (DST): UTC+2 (CEST)
- Climate: Csb

Santa Colomba de Somoza, whose name is in Leonese language, is a municipality located in the province of León, Castile and León, Spain. According to the 2004 census (INE), the municipality has a population of 498 inhabitants.

== Santa Colomba de Somoza in the movies ==
- 2005 : Saint-Jacques... La Mecque directed by Coline Serreau
