= Fabbriche di Careggine =

Human settlement in Careggine, Province of Lucca, Tuscany, Italy

Coordinates: 44.1246°N 10.3045°E

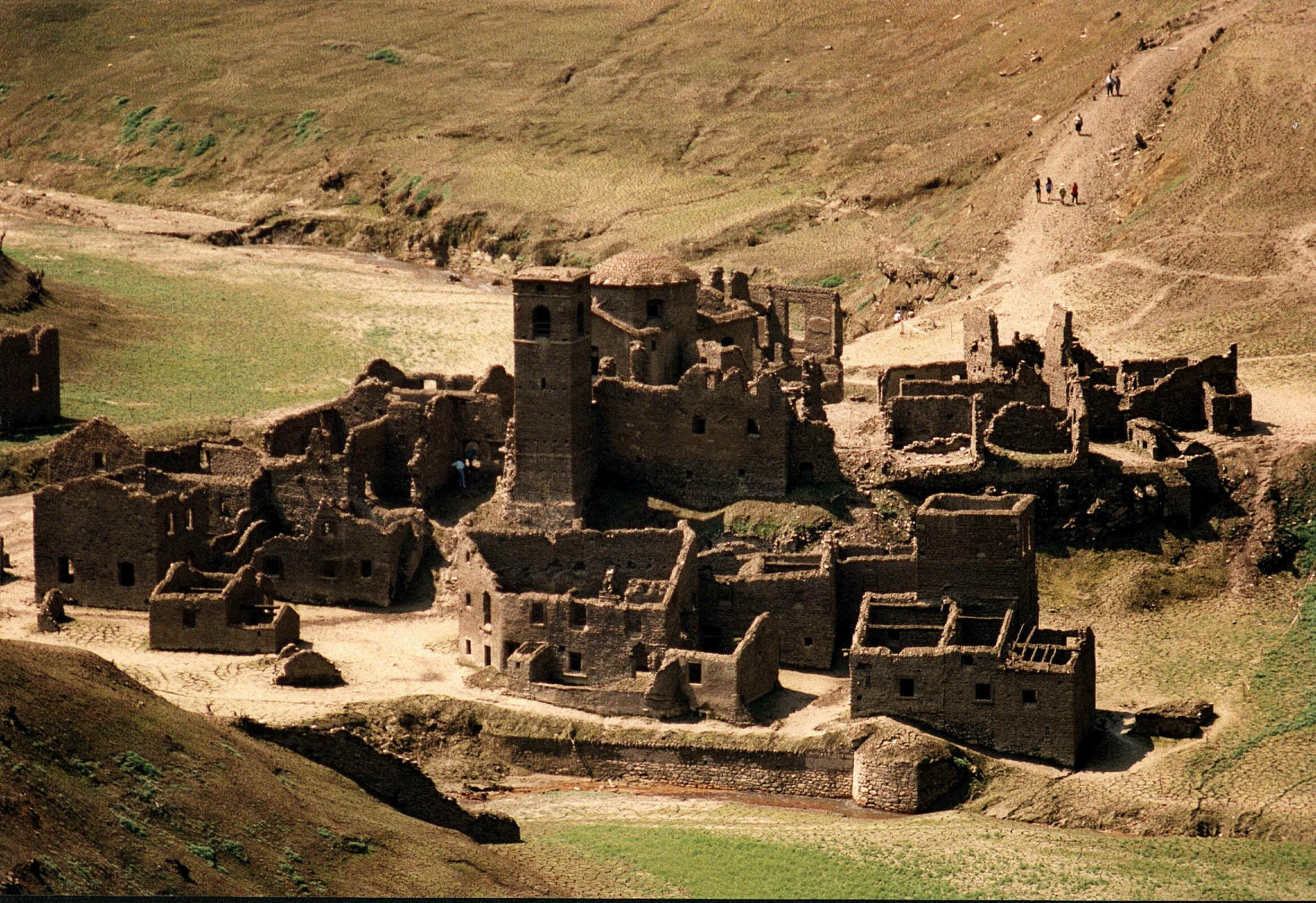
The village of Fabbriche di Careggine during its 1994 emergence

Fabbriche di Careggine was a village in Tuscany, Italy that was destroyed by construction of the Lago di Vagli reservoir in 1946. The village had been established in 1270. The village is submerged under 34 million cubic meters (1.2 billion cubic feet) of water and its structures — homes, churches and cemeteries — are still preserved. The village is occasionally seen when the lake is drained to conduct maintenance work. The village was seen above water in 1994 and in 2020 it was reported that the village would be uncovered again in 2021, after 27 years underwater.

Due to water shortages in the area draining has been postponed several times and is now stated to be spring 2024 (Gazette 7 June 2023)
