= Lukangol =

Former town in South Sudan

- Town
- Country: South Sudan
- State: Jonglei

Lukangol was a town in Jonglei, South Sudan that was destroyed during the 2011 South Sudan clashes. Before its destruction, it had a population of 20,000.
