= José Aragón Escacena =

Spanish writer

José Aragón Escacena (1891 in Astorga, (León Province), Spain – 1945 in Spain) was a Leonese language writer.

He wrote "Entre Brumas", edited in 1921 and awarded in the IX Century of Leonese "Fueros" (Laws).

== Books ==
- Entre Brumas (1921)

== See also ==
- List of Leonese language writers
- Leonese language
- Kingdom of León
