= Xuasús González =

Leonese language writer

- Born: 19 April 1981 León, Castile and León, Spain
- Occupation: writer, historian, journalist, editor, astronom
- Citizenship: Spanish

Xuasús González (born April 19 1981 in León, Spain) is a Leonese language writer.

He collaborated in Cuentos del Sil (2006) and wrote several columns for La Nuestra Tierra, a weekly newspaper in Leonese language.

== See also ==
- Leonese language
- Leonese language writers
