= Pharyngeal fricative =

A pharyngeal fricative is a speech sound, but the term is ambiguous and can refer to the following:

- Voiceless pharyngeal fricative [ħ]
- Voiced pharyngeal fricative [ʕ]
