= Eva González (disambiguation) =

Eva González (born 1980) is a Spanish beauty pageant winner who represented her country at the Miss Universe 2003 pageant.

Eva González may also refer to:

- Eva González (writer) (1918–2007), Leonese language writer
- Eva Gonzalès (1849–1883), French Impressionist painter
- Eva González (Argentine footballer) (born 1987), Argentine football centre-back
- Eva González (Mexican footballer) (born 1997), Mexican football defensive midfielder
