= Asociación Cultural de la Llingua Llïonesa El Fueyu =

The Asociación Cultural de la Llingua Llïonesa El Fueyu (Cultural Association of the Leonese Language El Fueyu) was a Leonese language association whose main effort was promoting the knowledge of Leonese language and the defense of the rights of Leonese language speakers.

== History ==
The Leonese language association El Fueyu was created in Llión in 2005, and developed some activity mainly in the province of Llión, and also in Zamora and Salamanca (Spain). The last public activities of the Asociación Cultural de la Llingua Llïonesa El Fueyu took place in 2011.

== Courses ==
The Asociación Cultural de la Llingua Llïonesa El Fueyu signed some agreements with Leonese public institutions for promoting some municipality courses on Leonese language, as the town councils of León, Mansilla de las Mulas, Valencia de Don Juan, La Bañeza and Zamora and the provincial government of León

== Leonese Language Day ==
The Asociación Cultural de la Llingua Llïonesa El Fueyu first celebrated the Leonese Language Day on June 20, 2006. After that year, the town council of León organized for some years that Day with the support of a few Leonese language associations, all of them dependent on the political association Conceyu Xoven. The sixth and last Leonese Language Day was celebrated on June 18, 2011.

== Leonese literature ==
The Asociación Cultural de la Llingua Llïonesa El Fueyu published, with the collaboration of the Asociación Berciana en Defensa de la Llingua Llïonesa El Toralín, the book Cuentos del Sil (Tales of the Sil), where several authors from or related to El Bierciu wrote short stories in Leonese language.

== See also ==
- Leonese language
- Cuentos del Sil
- Asociación Berciana en Defensa de la Llingua Llïonesa El Toralín
- Asociación de Profesores y Monitores de Llingua Llïonesa
