= Bustillo del Páramo =

Bustillo del Páramo Bustiellu'l Páramu
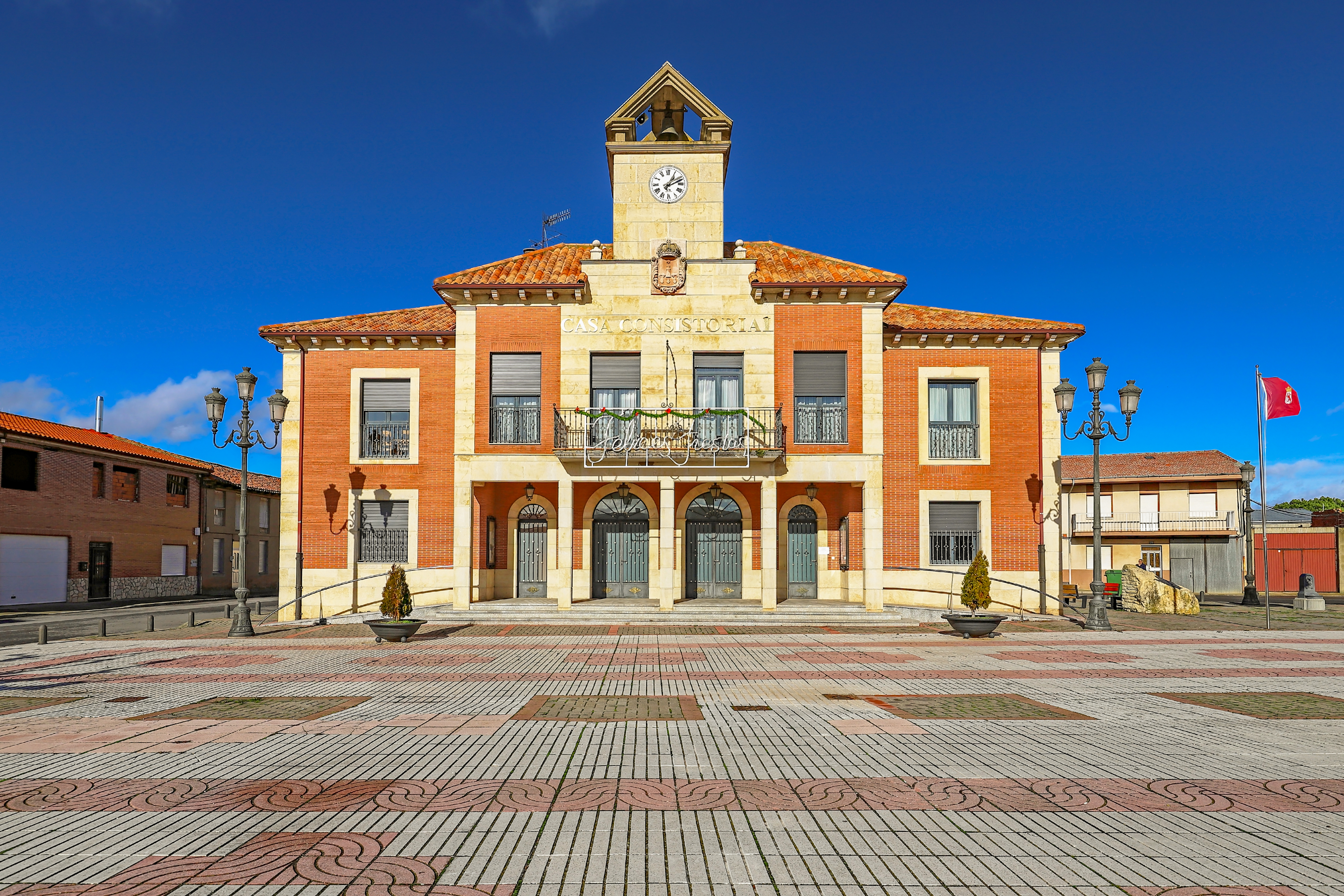
- Town hall

- Flag Coat of arms

- Location within Spain
- Coordinates: 42°26′28″N 5°47′30″W
- Country: Spain
- Autonomous community: Castile and León
- Province: León
- Municipality: Bustillo del Páramo

Government
  - Mayor: Faustino Sutil Honrado (PP)

Area
  - Total: 71.77 km^{2} (27.71 sq mi)
- Elevation: 845 m (2,772 ft)

Population (2025-01-01)
  - Total: 1,057
  - Density: 14.73/km^{2} (38.14/sq mi)
- Demonym(s): bustillejo, bustilleja
- Time zone: UTC+1 (CET)
  - Summer (DST): UTC+2 (CEST)
- Postal Code: 24357
- Telephone prefix: 987
- Website: Ayto. de Bustillo del Páramo

Bustillo del Páramo (Spanish pronunciation: [busˈtiʎo ðel ˈpaɾamo], Leonese: Bustiellu'l Páramu) is a municipality located in the province of León, Castile and León, Spain. According to the 2010 census (INE), the municipality has a population of 1,484 inhabitants.

== Villages ==
- Acebes del Páramo
- Antoñanes del Páramo
- Barrio de Buenos Aires
- Bustillo del Páramo
- Grisuela del Páramo
- Matalobos del Páramo
- La Milla del Páramo
- San Pedro de Pegas
