= Hermogius =

Saint Hermogius
- Born: Tui, Spain
- Died: 942; Ribas del Sil
- Venerated in: Roman Catholic Church
- Feast: 26 June
- Attributes: Benedictine

Hermogius was a Benedictine bishop, and uncle to Pelagius of Cordova.

Born at Tui, Spain, Hermogius founded Labrugia Monastery in Spanish Galicia in 915. Shortly afterwards he was taken prisoner by the Moors after their recent conquest of the area. Hermogius was released when his nephew, Pelagius took his place as a hostage for the Moors. Pelagius would later suffer death as a martyr, with Hermogius retreating to Ribas del Sil, where he would eventually die, in 942.
