= Kurmanji phonology =

Sounds used in an Iranian language

Kurmanji (also known as Northern Kurdish) is a Northwestern Iranian language predominantly spoken in Eastern Turkey (Northern Kurdistan), Northeastern Syria (Rojava), the regions in the Kurdistan Region of Iraq and in western Iran (Eastern Kurdistan) bordering Turkey, and northeastern part of Iran (Khorasani Kurds), and to some extent in Armenia and various diaspora populations spread across Europe and the Middle East. Kurmanji comprises a set of mutually intelligible dialects that share vocabulary, morphology, phonology, and syntax. Grammatically, Kurmanji has parallels with languages closely related in the Western Iranian language family, such as Sorani (Central Kurdish), Persian, Luri, Zazaki, and Balochi.

The following describes the phonology of Standard Kurmanji, which was developed as a literary medium during the second quarter of the 20th century and is heavily based on Kurmanji spoken in and around historical Botan (today’s Cizre and the surrounding areas). Distinct features of specific dialects are indicated alongside when relevant.

== Vowels ==
Standard Kurmanji has eight vowels. These can be differentiated by length and quality. However, vowel length is not a phonemically distinguishing feature, as one vowel phoneme is by default either long or short. There are five long and three short phonemes.

The table below shows the vowel inventory of Kurmanji. Alternative descriptions for certain phonemes are included together and explained in the notes under the table.

Vowel inventory of Standard Kurmanji
	Front	Central	Back
Close	iː	ɨ	uː
Near-close			ʊ
Close-mid	eː		oː
Near-open	æ~ɛ^{1}		
Open	ɑː~aː^{2}		

1. For this particular phoneme, description in different studies varies between close-open front unrounded /æ/: and its higher neighbor open-mid front unrounded /ɛ/. Either way, it is marked as a single phone.
2. There are discussions on the existence of a short open front /a/. Many studies suggest a back long open /ɑː/, while there are some suggesting front open vowel /aː/. In any case, Standard Kurmanji does not differentiate between qualities or the length of this particular phoneme.

=== Length ===
Long vowels are the five tense vowels given as /ɑː/ (or /aː/), /eː/, /iː/, /oː/, and /uː/ that are commonly found in other languages of the world and also known as a typical 5-vowel system. They are realized at least half a length longer than the short ones in pronunciation. Short vowels are the three more central vowels /æ/ (or /ɛ/), /ʊ/, and /ɨ/.

The vowel /ʊ/ in open initial syllables may be subject to shift to /ɨ/. The syllable may further merge with the following one if the next syllable’s onset is a post-velar fricative.

- du [dʊ] → di [dɨ] “two”
- tune [tʊ.'ne] → tine [tɨ.'ne] “there is not”
- muhacir [mʊ.hɑː.'d͡ʒɨr] → mihacir [mɨ.hɑː.'d͡ʒɨr] → macir [mɑː.'d͡ʒɨr] “refugee”
- Muhemed [mʊ.hæ.'mæd] → Mihemed [mɨ.hæ.'mæd] → Memed [mæ.'mæd] “Muhammad”

The long vowels /iː/ and /eː/ at the word-final position are subject to shortening with an excrescent glide /j/ when followed by a vowel. Both the close front vowel /iː/ and the close-mid front vowel /eː/ shift to /ɪ/, somewhere closer to the front in the mouth than /ɨ/, and are represented by an "i" in writing.

- kanî [kɑː.'niː] "spring" → kaniya spî [kɑː.'nɪ.jɑː sɨ.'piː] "white spring"
- sêwî [seː.'wiː] "orphan" → sêwiyê gundî [seː'wɪ.jeː ɡʊn.'diː] "orphan of the village"
- rê [reː] "road, way" → riya me ['rɪ.jɑː mæ] "our way"
- dê [deː] "mother" → diya min ['dɪ.jɑː mɨn] "my mother"

Except for certain grammatical particles, such as prepositions li /lɨ/, bi /bɨ/, and ji /ʒɨ/, /ɨ/ may not be at the end of a word, nor is it found in the beginning. The short round vowel /ʊ/ also does not appear word-initially or word-finally.

=== Epenthetic vowels ===
Particularly, "i" is commonly found as the default epenthetic vowel to regulate syllabic structures allowed in Kurmanji phonology. Some analyses suggest the epenthetic vowel may be a schwa sound, although it is still represented by an "i".

- bra [bɾɑː] → bira [bɨ.'ɾɑː]/[bə.'ɾɑː] "brother"
- brûsk [bruːsk] → birûsk [bɨ.'ruːsk]/[bə.'ruːsk] "thunder"
- stran [strɑːn] → sitran [sɨt.'rɑːn]/[sət.'rɑːn] "song"
- spî [spiː] → sipî [sɨ.'piː]/[sə.'piː] "white"
- şkeft [ʃkæft] → şikeft [ʃɨ.'kæft]/[ʃə.'kæft] "cave"

The epenthetic i, especially appearing at the end of the word, may be lost in certain conditions, such as being followed by a vowel.

- eqil ['æ.qəl] "mind" → eqlê selîm ['æq.leː sæ'liːm] "sensus communis"
- fehim ['fæ.həm] "intelligence" → fehmatî [fæh.mɑː.'tiː] "comprehension"

Other short vowels are also used as epenthetic vowels in certain constructions, such as /æ/ in compound nouns.

- rasterast [rɑːs.tæ.'rɑːst] “direct, straight, correct”
- berfeşîr [bæɾ.fæ.'ʃiːɾ] “ice cream”

=== Regressive assimilation ===
In Kurmanji, singular masculine nouns that include /ɑː/ or /æ/ in their final syllable are subject to regressive assimilation to high vowel /eː/ when receiving the masculine oblique case suffix -(y)î, followed by the loss of the suffix.

- şivan [ʃɨ.'vɑːn] "shepherd" + -î → şivên [ʃɨ.'veːn] "shepherd" (obl.)
- bajar [bɑː.'ʒɑːɾ] "city" + -î → bajêr [bɑː.'ʒeːɾ] "city" (obl.)

The regressive assimilation may be carried to the penultimate syllable with /ɑː/ or /æ/ if the final syllable is a high vowel /ɨ/ or /iː/.

- xanî [xɑː.'niː] "house" + -(y)î → xênî [xeː.'niː] "house" (obl.)
- kevir [kæ.'vɨɾ] "stone" + -î → kêvir [keː.'vɨɾ] "stone" (obl.)

=== Dialectal shifts in vowels ===
Several vernaculars of Berferati (Northwestern) Kurmanji, specifically varieties spoken in Elbistan, are subject to a significant vowel shift defined by rising and rounding: /æ/ to /ɑː/, /ɑː/ to /ɔː/, and in some instances /eː/ and /ɨ/ to /æ/.

- av [ɑːv] → [ɔ:v] "water"
- ziman [zɨ.'mɑːn] → [zɨ.'mɔːn] "tongue"
- hêstî [heːs'tiː] → [hæs.'tiː] "bone"
- li [lɨ] → [læ] "at"

Badini (Southwestern) Kurmanji also shows a significant dialectal deviation by fronting the long close round vowel from /uː/ to /yː/ (the same sound shift can be observed in Attic Greek and Zazaki). Further rounding to /iː/ happens in the southernmost areas. Speakers with rounded front close vowel /y/ commonly use the umlauted u “ü” in writing.

- dûr [duːr] → [dyːr] → [diːr] “far”
- bûk [buːk] → [byːk] → [biːk] “bride”

== Consonants ==
The number of consonants in Standard Kurmanji is twenty-six. However, there are only twenty-three characters in the Standard Kurmanji alphabet. With the addition of aspirated voiceless plosives and pharyngeal fricatives, the number of consonants in actual spoken language may reach thirty-two.

The table below shows the consonant inventory commonly found throughout Kurmanji dialects. Sounds in parentheses represent commonly observed phonemes that are nevertheless excluded as part of the standard language, or alternative descriptions of certain phonemes.

Consonant inventory of Standard Kurmanji
		Labial	Labio-Dental	Alveolar	Palatal	Velar		Uvular	Pharyngeal	Glottal
		Labial	Labio-Dental	Alveolar	Palatal	plain	labial.	Uvular	Pharyngeal	Glottal
Plosive	voiceless asp.	(pʰ)^{1}		(tʰ)^{1}	(t͡ʃʰ)^{1}	(kʰ)^{1}				
Plosive	vcls. unasp.	p		t	t͡ʃ	k		q		
Plosive	voiced	b		d	d͡ʒ	ɡ				
Fricative	voiceless		f	s	ʃ	x^{2}	xʷ^{5}		(ħ)^{3}	h
Fricative	voiced		v	z	ʒ	ɣ^{2}		(ʁ)^{2}	(ʕ)^{3}	
Nasal		m		n		(ŋ)^{7}				
Approximant		w				j				
Lateral				l,(ɫ)^{4}						
Tap/flap				ɾ^{6}						
Trill				r^{6}						

1. The existence of a three-way contrast in plosives is extensively discussed. However, Standard Kurmanji treats the distinction in aspiration as mostly nonexistent.
2. Standard Kurmanji orthography does not differentiate between voiced velar fricative /ɣ/ and voiceless velar fricative /x/ in writing. However, they are treated as two separate phonemes. In some instances, the voiced fricative appears as uvular.
3. In most modern standardization efforts, pharyngeal fricatives are not treated as part of the language, and thus not included in the phonetic inventory. However, they are prominently found across dialects.
4. The presence of velarized lateral approximant /ɫ/ is recorded as dialectal.
5. The labialized velar fricative /xʷ/ is represented by two characters “xw” in the Standard Kurdish orthography.
6. While there is no orthographic standard to distinguish trilled alveolar /r/ from flapped alveolar /ɾ/, they act as distinct phonemes. The distinction is usually unofficially indicated in writing by double r’s (rr) for trill and single r (r) for flap.
7. Velar nasal only appears before the voiced velar stop /g/. However, Haig et al. note it as a part of the phonemic inventory.

Kurmanji phonology eliminates double consonants found in Arabic and Persian loans or in compound words, except in a few common loan phrases.

- (Persian) ملا [mul.'laː] "mullah, religious scholar" → mela [mæ.'lɑː] “mullah”
- (Arabic) ملة [mil.'la] "community" → milet [mɨ.'læt] "nation"
- (Arabic) حق [ħaqq] "truth, correctness" → heq [ħæq] "right, justice"
- paş [pɑːʃ] "after" + şîv [ʃiːv] "dinner" → paşîv [pɑː.'ʃiːv] "suhur, pre-dawn breakfast"

Another common occurrence in daily speech is the loss of the final velar voiceless stop /k/ in many words. Usually, the elimination aims to delete the so-called "diminutive -k".

- zarok [zɑː.'roːk] → zaro [zɑː.'roː] "child"
- serşok [sæɾ.'ʃoːk] → serşo [sæɾ.'ʃoː] "bath"

=== Labiovelars ===
In many instances, the labialized velar fricative /xʷ/ is a direct descendant of Proto-Indo-European /sw/. Compare xwişk [xʷɨʃk] “sister” with English sister from P.I.E. *swésōr, or xwe [xʷæ] “oneself” with Latin se, sui “oneself” from P.I.E. *swé-.

A common occurrence among various vernaculars is the shift from the labialized velar fricative /xʷ/ to plain voiceless velar fricative /x/. The shift happens in various dialects independently at different paces. The shift happening before the short vowel /æ/ causes compensatory lengthening to /aː/.

- xwedê [xʷæ.'deː] → xadê [xɑː.'deː] “god”
- xwestin [xʷæs.'tɨn] → xastin [xɑːs.'tɨn] “to want”

Gündoğdu reports that Kurmanji spoken in Muş is breaking the near-close rounded short vowel /ʊ/ after velars, resulting in the emergence of a set of labiovelar stops [kʷ], [gʷ], [qʷ]. While Gündoğdu treats them as separate sounds, their regular occurrence only where palatal stops are followed by the former short front round vowel /ʊ/ presents them as allophones of the existing velar stops.

- kur [kʊr] → [kʷɨr] "son"
- gul [gʊl] → [gʷɨl] "rose"

=== Aspiration ===
Native speakers of Kurmanji retain the distinction between aspirated and non-aspirated stops and affricates. Overall, aspiration does not act as a phonemically differentiating characteristic except for a few monosyllabic instances. The few examples of minimal pairs provided by Gündoğdu are given as follows:

- ker [kʰæɾ] "donkey" - [kæɾ] "deaf"
- kêr [kʰeːɾ] "knife" - [keːɾ] "useful"
- kal [kʰɑːl] "unripe" - [kɑːl] "old man"
- çil [t͡ʃʰɨl] "forty" - [t͡ʃɨl] "‘rapacious’"

Several scholars have suggested that the three-way distinction in plosives is a result of a substrate borrowing from Armenian for several reasons, such as the extent of its prevalence in the Kurmanji-speaking area being mostly confined to the northern regions, its low semantic load, inconsistency among its appearance in dialects, and seeming unrelated to the original three-way stops in Proto-Iranian.

=== Pharyngealization ===
Several Kurmanji dialects, especially those in extensive contact with Arabic and Aramaic, are subject to the process known as pharyngealization, meaning that the pharyngeal fricatives [ħ] and [ʕ] that are common to Semitic languages have permeated into Kurmanji. The examples below show the pharyngeal sounds in Arabic loanwords commonly appearing in Kurmanji phonology.

- (Arabic) جماعة [d͡ʒa.maː.ʕa] "people, community" → cemaet [d͡ʒæ.mɑː.'ʕæt] "people, community"
- (Arabic) عدالة [ʕa.daː.la] "justice" → edalet [ʕæ.dɑː.'læt] "justice"
- (Arabic) بحر [baħr] "sea" → behr [bæħr] "sea"
- (Arabic) حكيم [ħa.kiːm] "wise" → hakim [ħɑ:.'kɨm] "judge"

In a few instances, the voice of the pharyngeal may be found shifted in Kurmanji.

- (Arabic) طعم [tˤa.ʕam] "taste" → tehm [tˤæħm] "taste"

Pharyngealization in some dialects has permeated to such an extreme that these consonants have even contaminated non-Arabic vocabulary. The examples below are the Iranic words in Kurmanji that commonly show pharyngealization.

- ezman [æz.'mɑːn] → [ʕæz.'mɑːn] "sky"
- eywan [æj.'wɑːn] → [ʕæj.'wɑːn] "courtyard"
- heft [hæft] → [ħæft] "seven"
- pan [pɑːn] → [pæħn] "flat"

An independent but parallel pharyngealization is also noted in Northern Kurmanji, which is in close contact with Caucasian languages that have their own pharyngeal inventories.

- masî [mɑː.'siː] → [mæ.ˈʕsˁiː] "fish"
- çav [t͡ʃɑːv] → [t͡ʃæʕv] "eye"
- mar [mɑːɾ] → [mæʕɾ] "snake"

The pharyngealization process is observed to have further effect in dialects that have been in most recent contact with Arabic, particularly Southwestern Kurmanji spoken in Syria. Öpengin discusses the existence of yet another distinct set of emphatic obstruents [tˤ], [dˤ], [sˤ], [zˤ].

- tarî [tɑː'ɾiː] → [tˤɑː'ɾiː] "darkness"
- das [dɑːs] → [dˤɑːs] "sickle"
- sed [sæd] → [sˤæd] "hundred"
- mezin [mæ.ˈzɨn[ → [mæ.'zˤɨn] "large"

=== Dialectal shifts in consonants ===
A very common occurrence across dialects is the lenition of the voiced labial stop [b] to [β]. The shift is observed in non-grammatical morphemes in vocalic environments and is sometimes reflexed in writing by the speakers of softened b using v instead.

- seba [sæ.'bɑː] → [sæ.'βɑː] "for the reason"
- cewab [d͡ʒæ.'wɑːb] → [d͡ʒæ.'wɑːβ] "answer"
- dibim ['dɨ.'bɨm] → ['dɨ.'βɨm] "I become" (conjugation of bûn) / "I take" (conjugation of birin)
- dibêjim ['dɨ.'beː.ʒɨm] → ['dɨ.'βeː.ʒɨm] "I say"

Southern Bahdini collapses the difference between labial fricatives altogether to /w/, including the previously observed labials from [b].

- av [ɑːv] → [ɑːw] "water"
- zebeş [zæ.'bæʃ] → [zæ.'wæʃ] "watermelon"

== Stress ==
Kurmanji is generally accepted as a stress-accent language, and it usually places the stress at the final syllable of the root word, although there are notable exceptions. There are certain rules governing the shift in stress with affixation.

- With strong suffixes, such as plural nominal declension and ezafe suffixes (-ên, -an) or the infinitive suffix (-(i)n/-în), the stress shifts to the rightmost syllable.
  zarok [zɑː.'roːk] “child(ren)” → zarokan [zɑː.roː.'kɑːn] “of children” (OBL.)
  gundî [ɡʊn.'diː] “villager(s)” → gundiyan [ɡʊn.dɨ.'jɑːn] “of villagers” (OBL.)
  avêt- [ɑː.'veːt] → avêtin [ɑː.veː.'tɨn] “to throw”
  hat- [hɑːt] → hatin [hɑː.'tɨn] “to come”
- Verbal prefixes, both preverbs (ve-, wer-, ra-, hil-) and modal prefixes (bi-, di-) and their negatives (na-/ni-, ne-, me-), are stressed and carry the primary stress all the way to the beginning. A secondary stress might appear at the original place in the root of the verb.
  geriya [gæ.ɾɨ.'jɑː] → digeriya ['dɨ.gæ.ɾɨ.jɑː], digerin ['dɨ.gæ.ɾɨn], bigerin ['bɨ.gæ.ɾɨn]
  girt [gɨɾt] → hilgirt ['hɨl.gɨɾt], vegirt ['væ.gɨɾt], hildigirin ['hɨl.dɨ.gɨ.ɾɨn], vedigirin ['væ.dɨ.gɨ.ɾɨn]
- In the case of both a preverb and a modal prefix occurring in a verb, the verbal prefix takes the stress. However, in negative conjugation, the negative modal prefix dominates.
  vedigirt ['væ.dɨ.gɨɾt] → venegirt [væ.'næ.gɨɾt]
  hildigirim ['hɨl.dɨ.gɨ.ɾɨm] → hilnagirim [hɨl.'nɑːgɨ.ɾɨm]
  radiket ['rɑː.dɨ.kʰæt] → raneket [rɑː.'næ.kʰæt]
  radizim ['rɑː.dɨ.zɨm] → ranazim [rɑː.'naː.zɨm]
- With weak suffixes, such as the singular nominal declension (-î, -ê) and ezafe (-(y)ê, -(y)a), and verbal conjugation (-m, -î, -e, -n), the stress stays at the end of the root.
- Compound words are treated as a single unit, and the stress falls on the ultimate syllable.

Several example words with penultimate stress are words that are originally monosyllabic but receive epenthetic /ɨ/ to break the illegal coda clusters, and several grammatical words.

eqil ['æ.qəl] "mind"
fehim ['fæ.həm] "understanding"
çawa ['t͡ʃʰɑː.wɑː] "how"
kîjan ['kʰiː.ʒɑːn] "which"

== Orthography ==
Kurmanji has been written with a multitude of alphabets. The current standard was formed by Celadet Alî Bedirxan and first used in his journal Hawar (“The Cry”), published between 1932 and 1943. Since then, the alphabet was named after the journal, the Hawar alphabet.

The Hawar alphabet was inspired by the newly adopted Turkish alphabet, which was developed in 1928 and based on the Latin alphabet. The Latin-based Kurmanji alphabet was intended for Kurds in Turkey to be able to pick it up quickly, along with its suitability to represent vowels better than the former Perso-Arabic script.

The Hawar alphabet is an extended Latin alphabet consisting of 31 letters, with 8 vowels and 23 consonants, and each having an uppercase and lowercase form.

Hawar alphabet
1	2	3	4	5	6	7	8	9	10	11	12	13	14	15	16	17	18	19	20	21	22	23	24	25	26	27	28	29	30	31
Majuscule forms (also called uppercase or capital letters)
A	B	C	Ç	D	E	Ê	F	G	H	I	Î	J	K	L	M	N	O	P	Q	R	S	Ş	T	U	Û	V	W	X	Y	Z
Minuscule forms (also called lowercase or small letters)
a	b	c	ç	d	e	ê	f	g	h	i	î	j	k	l	m	n	o	p	q	r	s	ş	t	u	û	v	w	x	y	z
IPA Values
ɑː	b	d͡ʒ	t͡ʃ	d	æ	eː	f	g	h	ɨ	iː	ʒ	k	l	m	n	oː	p	q	ɾ,r	s	ʃ	t	ʊ	uː	v	w	x,ɣ	j	z

Sometimes in writing, speakers of pharyngealized Kurmanji vernaculars indicate the voiced pharyngeal fricative /ʕ/ with an apostrophe (’) and the voiceless pharyngeal fricative /ħ/ with an h followed by an apostrophe (h’). Bedirxan et al. also suggested using Ẍ,ẍ and Ḧ,ḧ, respectively for voiced velar fricative /ɣ/ and voiceless pharyngeal fricative /ħ/, although these characters have fallen out of use and today are not a part of the alphabet.

== Historical phonology ==
Kurmanji is situated within a dialect continuum between the Southwestern and Northwestern Iranian languages, at one end of the Kurdish languages. While the distinction between Southwestern and Northwestern Iranian languages is not clear-cut, Kurdish languages’ phonological evolution shares common characteristics with both southwestern and northwestern groups, with closer affinity to the northwestern characteristics while also sharing southwestern developments mostly due to its interaction with Persian and other Southwestern Iranian languages.

Historically, the ancestor of Kurdish is estimated to have originally been located around modern-day Isfahan towards the beginning of the Middle Iranian period (200 BC), which can be traced via analyzing the potential interaction between Kurdish, Persian (originated in around modern day Fars), and Balochi (possibly originated around modern Kerman in Eastern Iran). With the consequent events over the past 2000 years, Kurdish gradually expanded to its modern territory and came into contact with different languages of the area, such as Armenian, Aramaic, Arabic, Turkish, and Zazaki.

It is important to indicate that the extensive interaction with Persian, especially in the medieval period as the prestige language, has affected the lexicon to reflect southwestern characteristics independent of the internal shifts, and the length and the nature of this contact obscures many original developments in Kurmanji or impedes uncovering them altogether. Nevertheless, from observing its interaction with the other languages of the region over time and the comparison between dialects and related languages, it is possible to map a rough pattern of the phonological evolution of Kurmanji.

=== From Western Iranian to Northwestern Iranian ===
A few key northwestern characteristics are present in the common Kurdish vocabulary, distinguishing it from the southwestern group.

- The shift of Proto-Iranian alveo-dental affricates to alveolar fricatives, *c [t͡s] > s [s]; *j [d͡z] > z [z], is regularly observed in the common vocabulary

Proto-Iranian	Kurmanji	Translation
*cŕ̥Hah	ser [sæɾ]	head
*mácyah	masî [mɑː'siː]	fish
*jānaH-tá-	zan- [zɑːn]	knew (preterite)
*aj(ám)	ez [æz]	I (DIR.)

- The typical northwestern cluster shift, *cw [t͡sw] > sp [sp], has occurred in the core Kurdish vocabulary, although potential Persian loans may mask the development.

Proto-Iranian	Kurmanji	Translation
*ácwah	hesp [hæsp]	horse
*cwaytáh	spî [spiː]	white

=== Southwestern Iranian Shifts in Kurdish ===
Several sound shifts in Kurmanji are more characteristic of the Southwestern group, which are nevertheless observed in Kurdish languages and seem to be internal developments within the language rather than a feature acquired due to Persian loans.

- The cluster *hw, which usually simplifies to [w] in the Northwestern Iranian languages, is preserved in Kurmanji as a labialized velar fricative xw [xʷ], shared with other southwestern languages such as Persian and Luri.

Proto-Iranian	Kurmanji	Translation
*hwárdah	xwelî [xʷæ'liː]	ash
*hwanH-tá-	xwend- [xʷænd]	read (preterite)
*hwar-tá-	xwar- [xʷɑːɾ]	ate (preterite)

- The consonant cluster *rz is found in Kurmanji as l, typical for Southwestern Iranian languages. This shift most possibly occurred in Kurdish in parallel with Persian by extensive loaning, eliminating the native reflex of the cluster (as some people like MacKenzie postulated several potential native reflexes).

Proto-Iranian	Kurmanji	Translation
*barjíš	balîf [bɑː'liːf]	pillow

- Unlike most of the Northwestern languages, where the Proto-Iranian cluster *dw [dw] reduces to b [b], Kurdish shows parallel development with Persian, having d [d] instead. This shift is hard to establish due to the lack of an adequate number of reflexes to assess.

Proto-Iranian	Kurmanji	Translation
*dwā́ram	derî [dæ'ɾiː]	door
*dwáH	du [dʊ]	two

=== From Western Iranian to Proto-Kurdish ===
Certain shifts have been observed uniquely in Kurdish. The characteristics shifts from the Western Iranian to Kurdish are;

- Loss of the initial consonant from clusters -xm- [xm], -šm- [ʃm] (preceding 2).

Proto-Iranian	Kurmanji	Translation
*čášma(n)	çav [t͡ʃɑːv]	eye
*táwxma(n)	tov [toːv]	seed

- Transition from Old-Iranian *–m- [m] to -v[v]/w[w]-.

Proto-Iranian	Kurmanji	Translation
*hamaH	havîn [hɑː'viːn]	summer
*jā́mātā	zava [zɑː'vɑː]	groom
*kamān	kevan [kæ'vɑːn]	arch, bow

- Fortition of initial fricatives *ϑ > t [t]/[tʰ]; *x > k [k]/[kʰ], yielding some affricate voiceless stops unique to Kurmanji.

Proto-Iranian	Kurmanji	Translation
*xárah	ker [kʰæɾ]	donkey
*θHaywā́	tî [tʰiː]	brother-in-law

- Shift from *š [ʃ] to h [h] in all cases except for certain clusters and word-initial position.

Proto-Iranian	Kurmanji	Translation
*xraišah,	rih [rɨh]	beard
*gáwšah	guh [gʊh]	ear

- Diphthong *au/aw shifts to o [oː]

Proto-Iranian	Kurmanji	Translation
*kapáwtah	kevo(h)k [kæ'voːk]	pigeon
gawb-táh	got- [goːt]	said (preterite)

- Umlauting: a shifts to ê [eː] or î [iː] before a syllable with i,y.

Proto-Iranian	Kurmanji	Translation
*kámb-ya	kêm [keːm]	few
*járHnya-	zêr [zeːr]	gold
*wāč-aya-	bêj- [beːʒ]	say (present)
(Archaic Persian) آیشم /ayišm/	hîv [hiːv]	moon

- Elision of fricative *ϑ before the flap r [ɾ], with compensatory lengthening: *(V)ϑr > *(V)hr > (Vː)r. Several words with multiple forms, like jar [ʒɑːɾ] / jehr [ʒæhɾ], suggest an intermediary period where *ϑ shifted to *h.

Proto-Iranian	Kurmanji	Translation
*āθr	ar [ɑːɾ]	fire
*puθráh	por [poːɾ]	son (found in compounds)
*ǰaθráH	je(h)r [ʒæhɾ]	poison

=== From Proto-Kurdish to Kurmanji ===
- Lenition of intervocalic stops to fricatives, with a potential intermediary voiceless fricative form: *[p],[b] > *[β][ɸ] > [v]; *[t],[d] > *[θ],[ð] > [h];

Proto-Iranian	Kurmanji	Translation
*graθ-ya-	girê(h) [gɨ'ɾeː]	knot, tie
*guθáh	gū(h) [guː]	excrement

- Shifts of intermediary *k to x [x] (with further elision in intervocalic positions) and *g to w [w] are observed in a handful of examples.

Proto-Iranian	Kurmanji	Translation
*ā́(H)-ka-	ax [ɑːx]	soil
*ni+kars-	ni(h)êrî- [nɨheː'ɾiː]	looked (preterite)
*dráwgah	derew [dæ'ɾæw]	lie
*dáwgah	dew [dæw]	ayran; buttermilk

- Proto-Iranian *mb shifts to m [m], yielding intervocalic m normally lost in an earlier process.

Proto-Iranian	Kurmanji	Translation
*ham-pāzah	himêz [hɨ.'meːz]	hug
*kamb-ya-	kêm [keːm]	few
(Middle Iranian) šambat	şemî [ʃæ'miː]	Saturday

- Proto-Iranian *nd shifts to n [n].

Proto-Iranian	Kurmanji	Translation
*banda-kah	benî [bæ'niː]	servant
*xand-	kenî- [kæ'niː]	laughed (preterite)

- Elision of intervocalic and final h [h] after long vowel: *Vːh(V)> Vːø(V)

Proto-Iranian	Kurmanji	Translation
*dūta-	dū(h) [duː]	smoke
*wāta-	ba [baː]	wind
*witár-	(bihurî)/borî- [boː'ɾiː]	passed (preterite)

- The cluster *fr shifts to trilled r [r]: *(V)fr > *(V)hr [hɾ] > (Vː)r̄ [r].

Proto-Iranian	Kurmanji	Translation
*fra-	ra- [rɑː]	preverb "front,for-"

- The cluster *-ft- shifts to t [t] (while preserved in Sorani or Persian).

Proto-Iranian	Kurmanji	Translation
*kap-ta-	ket- [kʰæt]	fell (preterite)
*gṛft-	girt- [ɡɨɾt]	grabbed (preterite)

- Fortition of initial w to b [b].

Proto-Iranian	Kurmanji	Translation
*warna-kah	berx [bæɾx]	lamb
*warājáh	beraz [bæ'ɾɑːz]	pig
*warānam	beran [bæ'ɾɑːn]	ram

- The cluster *-xt- shifts to -t-

Proto-Iranian	Kurmanji	Translation
*duxtā(r)	dot [doːt]	daughter (only in compounds)
*yuxtam	cot [d͡ʒoːt]	pair, plowshare
*pax-ta-	pet- [pæt]	cooked (preterite)

- From *rd- (Proto-Iranian *rt-) to r-

Proto-Iranian	Kurmanji	Translation
*kar-ta-	kir- [kɨɾ]	did (preterite)
*pr̥túš	pir [pʰɨɾ]	bridge

- An excrescent h is added at the beginning of open words.

Proto-Iranian	Kurmanji	Translation
*ácwah	hesp [hæsp]	horse
*a-gam-ta-	hat- [hɑːt]	came (preterite)

- Emphatization of š [ʃ] to affricate ç [t͡ʃʰ] occurs in certain words.

Proto-Iranian	Kurmanji	Translation
*šyáwa-	çû- [t͡ʃʰuː]	go (preterite)
*warš-	birçî [bɨɾˈt͡ʃʰiː]	hungry
*Hŕ̥šah	hirç [hɨɾt͡ʃʰ]	bear

- Kurmanji yields t- [t] in place of Proto-Iranian č [t͡ʃ] as a result of dissimilation before onset clusters št: *čVšt > tVšt:

Proto-Iranian	Kurmanji	Translation
čaštakah	taşt [tɑːʃt]	breakfast
*čisčid-	tişt [tɨʃt]	thing

== See also ==
- Kurdish phonology
- Sorani phonology
