= Kurdish phonology =

Sounds and pronunciation of Kurdish languages

Kurdish phonology is the sound system of the Kurdish dialect continuum. This article includes the phonology of the three Kurdish languages in their respective standard descriptions. (For the phonology of Kurmanji among them, see Kurmanji phonology.) Phonological features include the distinction between aspirated and unaspirated voiceless stops, and the large phoneme inventories.

== Consonants ==
Geographic distribution of Kurdish languages Kurmanji (Northern Kurdish) Sorani (Central Kurdish) Zaza language Southern Kurdish (Xwarîn) and Gorani Mixed dialect areas

Consonant phonemes
		Labial	Dental/ Alveolar		Palatal		Velar		Uvular		Pharyngeal	Glottal
		Labial	plain	velar.	plain	labial.	plain	labial.	plain	labial.	Pharyngeal	Glottal
Nasal		m	n				ŋ					
Plosive	voiceless asp.	pʰ (Note: Kurmanji only)	tʰ		t͡ʃʰ		kʰ					
Plosive	vcls. unasp.	p	t		t͡ʃ		k	kʷ	q	qʷ		ʔ
Plosive	voiced	b	d		d͡ʒ		ɡ	ɡʷ				
Fricative	voiceless	f	s	sˠ (Note: Sorani only)	ʃ		x	xʷ			ħ	h
Fricative	voiced	v	z	zˠ	ʒ		ɣ	ɣʷ			ʕ	
Approximant			l	ɫ	j	ɥ		w				
Tap/flap			ɾ									
Trill			r									

- /n, t, d/ are laminal denti-alveolar [n̪, t̪, d̪], while /s, z/ are dentalized laminal alveolar [s̪, z̪], pronounced with the blade of the tongue very close to the back of the upper front teeth, with the tip resting behind the lower front teeth.
- Kurdish contrasts plain alveolar /l/ and velarized postalveolar /ɫ/ lateral approximants. Unlike in English, the sounds are separate phonemes rather than allophones.
- Postvocalic /d/ is lenited to an approximant [ð̞]. This is a regional feature occurring in other Iranian languages as well and called by Windfuhr the "Zagros d".
- Kurdish has two rhotic sounds; the alveolar flap (/ɾ/) and the alveolar trill (/r/). While the former is alveolar, the latter has an alveo-palatal articulation.

Kurmanji

- Distinguishes between aspirated and unaspirated voiceless stops, which can be aspirated in all positions. Thus /p/ contrasts with /pʰ/, /t/ with /tʰ/, /k/ with /kʰ/, and the affricate /t͡ʃ/ with /t͡ʃʰ/.
- Although [ɥ] is considered an allophone of /w/, some phonologists argue that it should be considered a phoneme.

Sorani

- According to Hamid (2015), /x, xʷ, ɣ, ɣʷ/ are uvular [χ, χʷ, ʁ, ʁʷ].
- Distinguishes between the plain /s/ and /z/ and the velarized /sˠ/ and /zˠ/. These velarized counterparts are less emphatic than the Semitic emphatic consonants.

Xwarîn

- [ɲ] is an allophone of /n/, occurring in the about 11 to 19 words that have the consonant group ⟨nz⟩. The word "yanze" is pronounced as [jɑːɲzˠɛ].

=== Labialization ===
- Kurdish has labialized counterparts to the velar plosives, the voiceless velar fricative and the uvular stop. Thus /k/ contrasts with /kʷ/, /ɡ/ with /ɡʷ/, /x/ with /xʷ/, and /q/ with /qʷ/. These labialized counterparts do not have any distinct letters or digraph. Examples are the word "xulam" ('servant') which is pronounced as [xʷɪˈlɑːm], and qunc ('nook') is pronounced as [qʷɨnd͡ʒ].

=== Palatalization ===
- After /ɫ/, /t/ is palatalized to [tʲ]. An example is the Sorani word "galte" ('joke'), which is pronounced as [gɑːɫˈtʲæ].
- /k/ and /ɡ/ are palatalized before close vowels.
- When preceding /n/, /s, z/ are palatalized to /ʒ/. In the same environment, /ʃ/ also becomes /ʒ/.

=== Pharyngealization ===
- In some cases, /p, t, k, s, z/ are pharyngealized to [pˤ, tˤ, kˤ, sˤ, zˤ]. For example, the word "sed/ṣed" is pronounced as [ˈsˤɛd]
- Furthermore, while [fˤ] and [ɡˤ] are unique to Sorani, Kurmanji has [t͡ʃˤ].

=== Consonants in loanwords ===
- /ɣ/ is a phoneme that is almost exclusively present in words of Arabic origin. It is often replaced by /x/ in colloquial Kurdish. Thus the word "xerîb/ẍerîb" ('stranger', /ɣɛˈriːb/) may occur as either [xɛˈriːb] or [ɣɛˈriːb].
- /ʕ/ mostly occurs in words of Arabic origin, mostly in word-initial position.
- /ʔ/ is mainly present in Arabic loanwords and it affects the pronunciation of adjacent vowels. The use of the glottal stop in everyday Kurdish may be seen as an effort to highlight its Arabic source.

== Vowels ==
The vowel inventory differs by language, some languages having more vowel phonemes than others. The vowels /iː ʊ uː ɛ eː oː ɑː/ are the only phonemes present in all three Kurdish languages.

Vowel phonemes
	Front		Central	Back	
	unrounded	rounded	Central	unrounded	rounded
Close	ɪ iː		ɨ ʉː		ʊ uː
Close-mid	eː	øː			o oː
Open-mid	ɛ				
Open	a			ɑː	

=== Detailed table ===
Grapheme	Phoneme		
Grapheme	Kurmanji	Sorani	Xwarîn
a	ɑː	a	a
a	–	ɑː	ɑː
e	ɛ	ɛ	ɛ
ê	eː	eː	eː
i	ɪ	ɪ	ɨ
î	iː	iː	iː
o	oː	oː	o
o	–	–	oː
ö	–	–	øː
u	ʊ	ʊ	ʊ
û	uː	uː	uː
ü	–	yː	ʉː

=== Notes ===
- In Sorani, /a/ is realized as [æ], except before /w/ where it becomes mid-centralized to [ə]. For example, the word gewra ('big') is pronounced as [ɡəwˈɾæ].
- /ɪ/ is realized as [ɨ] in certain environments.
- In some words, /ɪ/ and /u/ are realized as [ɨ]. This allophone occurs when ⟨i⟩ is present in a closed syllable that ends with /m/ and in some certain words like dims ('molasses'). The word vedixwim ('I am drinking') is thus pronounced as [vɛdɪˈxʷɨm], while dims is pronounced as [dɨms].

=== Vowels in loanwords ===
- /øː/ occurs in numerous dialects of Sorani where it is represented by wê/وێ as well as in Xwarîn, represented by ⟨ö⟩. In Kurmanji, it is only present in loanwords from Turkish, where it often merges with /oː/. The word öks (from Turkish ökse meaning 'clayish mud') is pronounced as either [øːks] or [oːks].

=== Glides and diphthongs ===
The glides [w], [j], and [ɥ] appear in syllable onsets immediately followed by a full vowel. All combinations except the last four are present in all three Kurdish languages.

Diphthongs
IPA	Spelling	Example Word			Language		
IPA	Spelling	Example Word			Kurmanji	Sorani	Xwarîn
[əw]	ew	şew	[ˈʃəw]	'night' (Sorani)	Yes	Yes	Yes
[ɑːw]	aw	çaw	[ˈt͡ʃɑːw]	'eye' (Sorani)	Yes	Yes	Yes
[ɑːj]	ay	çay	[ˈt͡ʃɑːj]	'tea'	Yes	Yes	Yes
[ɛw]	ew	kew	[ˈkɛw]	'partridge'	Yes	Yes	Yes
[ɛj]	ey	peynje	[pɛjˈnʒæ] [pɛjˈnʒɑ]	'ladder'	Yes	Yes	Yes
[oːj]	oy	birroyn	[bɪˈroːjn]	'let's go' (Sorani)	Yes	Yes	Yes
[uːj]	ûy	çûy	[ˈt͡ʃuːj]	'went' (Sorani)	Yes	Yes	Yes
[ɑɥ]	a	de	[ˈdɑɥ]	'ogre' (Xwarîn)	No	No	Yes
[ʉːɥ]	üe	küe	[ˈkʉːɥɑ]	'mountain' (Xwarîn)	No	No	Yes
[ɛɥ]	eü	teüle	[tɛɥˈlɑ]	'stable' (Xwarîn)	No	No	Yes
[ɥɑ]	üe	düet	[dɥɑt]	'daughter' (Xwarîn)	No	No	Yes

== See also ==
- Kurmanji phonology
- Sorani phonology

== Bibliography ==
- Asadpour, Hiwa; Mohammadi, Maryam (2014), "A Comparative Study of Phonological System of Kurdish Varieties", Journal of Language and Cultural Education, 2 (3): 108–109 & 113, ISSN 1339-4584
- Campbell, George L.; King, Gareth (2000), Compendium of the World's Languages
- Fattah, Ismaïl Kamandâr (2000), Les dialectes Kurdes méridionaux, Acta Iranica, ISBN 9042909188
- Fattahi, Mehdi; Anonby, Erik; Gheitasi, Mojtaba (2016), Is the labial-palatal approximant a phoneme in Southern Kurdish? (PDF)
- Gündoğdu, Songül (2016), "Remarks on Vowels and Consonants in Kurmanji", Anemon, 4 (1), doi:10.18506/anemon.16606
- Haig, Geoffrey; Matras, Yaron (2002), "Kurdish linguistics: a brief overview" (PDF), Sprachtypologie und Universalienforschung, 55 (1), Berlin: 5, archived from the original (PDF) on 10 October 2017
- Hamid, Twana Saadi (2015), The Prosodic Phonology of Central Kurdish (PhD thesis), Newcastle University, hdl:10443/3386
- Khan, Celadet Bedir; Lescot, Roger (1970), Grammaire Kurde (Dialecte kurmandji), Paris: La librairie d'Amérique et d'Orient Adrien Maisonneuve
- Rahimpour, Massoud; Dovaise, Majid Saedi (2011), "A Phonological Contrastive Analysis of Kurdish and English", International Journal of English Linguistics, 1 (2): 75, doi:10.5539/IJEL.V1N2P73, S2CID 30247575
- McCarus, Ernest N. (1958), A Kurdish Grammar: Descriptive Analysis of the Kurdish of Sulaimaniya, Iraq (PDF), American Council of Learned Societies, LCCN 58-13564
- Sedeeq, Dashne Azad (2017), Diachronic Study of English Loan Words in the Central Kurdish Dialect in Media Political Discourse (PDF) (PhD thesis), University of Leicester, p. 82, hdl:2381/41229
- Öpengin, Ergin; Haig, Geoffrey (2014), "Regional variation in Kurmanji: A preliminary classification of dialects", Kurdish Studies, 2, doi:10.1163/9789004706552_005, ISSN 2051-4883
- Soane, Ely Banister (1922), "Notes on the Phonology of Southern Kurmanji", The Journal of the Royal Asiatic Society of Great Britain and Ireland, 54 (2), Cambridge University Press, doi:10.1017/S0035869X00150257, JSTOR 25209880
- Thackston, W.M. (2006a), Sorani Kurdish: A Reference Grammar with Selected Readings (PDF), archived from the original (PDF) on 27 February 2021
- Thackston, W.M. (2006b), Kurmanji Kurdish: A Reference Grammar with Selected Readings (PDF), archived from the original (PDF) on 8 March 2021
- Ludwig Windfuhr, Gernot (2012), The Iranian Languages, Routledge, ISBN 978-0-7007-1131-4
