= Sorani phonology =

Sound system of Central Kurdish language

Sorani, also known as Central Kurdish, is a Northwestern Iranian language predominantly spoken in the southern half of the Kurdistan Regional Government in Iraq and Western Iran, in particular Kurdistan, Kermanshah, and West Azerbaijan provinces. Sorani has been a long-standing literary language with significantly divergent yet mutually intelligible dialects that share vocabulary, morphology, phonology, and syntax. Grammatically, Sorani has parallels with languages closely related in the Western Iranian language family, primarily Persian and Kurmanji (Northern Kurdish), but also Luri and Southern Kurdish dialects.

The following describes the phonology of Sorani in the standardized format used in education, administration, and media, based on the Sulaymaniyah dialect. Distinct features of specific dialects are indicated alongside when relevant.

== Vowels ==
Sorani has eight vowels. These vowels can be differentiated by their length and quality. However, vowel length is not a phonemically distinguishing feature, as one vowel phoneme is by default either long or short. There are five long and three short phonemes.

The table below shows the vowel inventory of Sorani.

Vowel inventory of Sorani
	Front	Central	Back
Close	iː		uː
Near-close	ɪ		ʊ
Close-mid	eː		oː
Near-open	æ		
Open	ɑː		

=== Length ===
Long vowels are the five tense vowels given as /ɑː/, /eː/, /iː/, /oː/, and /uː/ that are commonly found in other languages of the world and also known as a typical 5-vowel system. They are realized at least half a length longer than the short ones in pronunciation. Short vowels are the three more central vowels /æ/, /ʊ/, and /ɪ/.

=== Diphthongs ===
It is argued that Sorani possesses at least a certain set of diphthongs. More commonly appearing diphthongs are;

- One group is the combination of a vowel with the front high unrounded vowel /i/ (or velar glide /j/).

- /ɑːi/: /taːir/ ~ /taːjr/ "bird", /maːi/ ~ /maːj/ "wine"
- /æi/:
- /oːi/: /boːi/ ~ /boːj/ "for",

- The other group is the combination of a vowel with the back high rounded vowel /u/ (or labiovelar glide /w/).

- /ɑːu/: /plaːu/ ~ /plaːw/ "rice", /aːu/ ~ /aːw/ "water"
- /æu/: /seu/ ~ /sew/ "apple",
- /oːu/: /toːu/ ~ /toːw/

McKenzie argues for the existence of the diphthong in Sulaymaniyah /œeː/, which is more generally described as /weː/.

=== Schwa ===
The existence of schwa ə is argued as a realization of the dental stop set (d, t) gone through lenition, acting as an allophone in certain dialects around Sulaimania.

As an extension; a third set of diphthongs with schwa is also proposed as an allophonic realization.

- /iːə/
- /ɪə/
- /æə/
- /ɑːə/
- /oːə/
- /uːə/

== Consonants ==
In total there are twenty-six consonants in Sorani. With the descriptions of dialects sometimes this number jumps to twenty-nine. The Sorani orthography allows writing twenty-eight of those consonants.

The table below shows the consonant inventory commonly found in Sorani. Sounds in parentheses represent commonly observed phonemes that are sometimes not found depending on the dialect.

Consonant inventory of Sorani
		Labial	Labio-Dental	Alveolar	Palatal	Velar	Uvular	Pharyngeal	Glottal
Plosive	voiceless.	p		t	t͡ʃ	k	q		
Plosive	voiced	b		d	d͡ʒ	ɡ			
Fricative	voiceless		f	s	ʃ	x		(ħ)	h
Fricative	voiced		v	z	ʒ	ɣ		(ʕ)	
Nasal		m		n		(ŋ)			
Approximant		w				j			
Lateral	fricative			ɫ					
Lateral	approximant			l					
Tap/flap				ɾ					
Trill				r					

== Orthography ==
Sorani adopted a modified form of Perso-Arabic script developed by Taufiq Wahby in 1920's and first used in 1923. It is designed as an almost true alphabet; unlike the (Perso)-Arabic script which is an abjad, in Sorani alphabet all sounds, including vowels, are represented.

The differentiation between semiwovel glides their vowel counterpart depend on the context; و stands for both w and ʊ, likewise ی can represent either j or iː. Long back round vowel uː is marked with repeating vowel وو.

The current alphabet includes 34 characters, including the character hamza for marking vowels. The duplicated وو is considered its own character.

Sorani alphabet
1	2	3	4	5	6	7	8	9	10	11	12	13	14	15	16	17	18	19	20	21	22	23	24	25	26	27	28	29	30	31	32	33	34
Isolated forms
ئـ	ا	ب	پ	ت	ج	چ	ح	خ	د	ر	ڕ	ز	ژ	س	ش	ع	غ	ف	ڤ	ق	ک	گ	ل	ڵ	م	ن	ھ	ە	و	وو	ۆ	ی	ێ
IPA Values
ʔ	aː	b	p	t	d͡ʒ	t͡ʃ	ħ	x	d	ɾ	r	z	ʒ	s	ʃ	ʕ	ɣ	f	v	q	k	g	l	ɫ	m	n	h	ɛ	w,ʊ	uː	oː	j,iː	eː

== See also ==
- Kurdish phonology
- Kurmanji phonology
