= Barrio de Buenos Aires (Bustillo del Páramo) =

- Locality
- Location within Province of León Location within Castile and León Location within Spain
- Coordinates: 42°26′12″N 5°52′21″W
- Country: Spain
- Autonomous community: Castile and León
- Province: Province of León
- Municipality: Bustillo del Páramo
- Elevation: 819 m (2,687 ft)

Population
  - Total: 22

Barrio de Buenos Aires is a locality located in the municipality of Bustillo del Páramo, in the province of León, Castile and León, Spain. As of 2020, it has a population of 22.

== Geography ==
Barrio de Buenos Aires is located 37km southwest of León, Spain.
