= Somali phonology =

Sound system of the Somali language

This article describes the phonology of the Somali language.

== Consonants ==
Somali has 23 consonants which cover every place of articulation on the IPA chart; though not all of these distinctions are phonemic.

Somali consonant phonemes
		Bilabial	Coronal	Post- alveolar	Velar	Uvular	Pharyn- geal	Glottal
Nasal		m ⟨m⟩	n ⟨n⟩					
Plosive	voiceless		t̪ ⟨t⟩		k ⟨k⟩	q ⟨q⟩		ʔ ⟨'⟩
Plosive	voiced	b ⟨b⟩	d̪ ⟨d⟩	ɖ ⟨dh⟩	ɡ ⟨g⟩			
Affricate				d͡ʒ ⟨j⟩				
Fricative	voiceless	f ⟨f⟩	s ⟨s⟩	ʃ ⟨sh⟩	x ⟨kh⟩	χ ⟨kh⟩	ħ ⟨x⟩	h ⟨h⟩
Fricative	voiced		z ⟨s/z⟩*				ʕ ⟨c⟩	
Trill			r ⟨r⟩	ɽ ⟨dh⟩				
Approximant			l ⟨l⟩	j ⟨y⟩	w ⟨w⟩			

/b, d, g/ is often lenited to [β̞, ð̞, ɣ̞] in stressed intervocalic positions, as in toban [t̪ʰòβ̞án] 'ten' and madow [màðów] 'black'.

/ɖ/ is a voiced retroflex stop. Some phoneticians say that it has an implosive quality for some speakers. It is sometimes realized as a flap [ɾ] between vowels.

/z/, a non-native phoneme often found in loanwords, may be pronounced by some speakers; it is normally substituted with /s/.

The voiceless stops /t, k/ are unreleased [t̪̚, k̚] in coda positions and are aspirated [t̪ʰ, kʰ] elsewhere.

/ʕ/, the voiced pharyngeal fricative, may have creaky voice.

/ʕ/ word initially is [ʡ͜ʢ]

An epenthetic glottal stop ([ʔ]) is inserted before vowels in word-initial position.

/r/ is often pronounced with breathy voice and may be partially devoiced. Between vowels, it may be a single tap.

In some dialects, /q/ can be realized as [χ] or [ʡ].

/ʍ/ is often realized as [ʍᶹ] in the Somali alluvial-plain dialects. /ʍ/ is realized as [w] in word-final positions like qaboo'.

/h/ is often voiced to [ɦ] in intervocalic positions.

== Vowels ==
Monophthongs of Somali on a vowel chart, from Saeed (1993)

Somali has five vowel articulations that all contrast murmured and harsh voice as well as vowel length. There is little change in vowel quality when the vowel is lengthened. Each vowel has a harmonic counterpart, and every vowel within a harmonic group (which notably can be larger than a word in Somali) must harmonize with the other vowels. The Somali orthography, however, does not distinguish between the two harmonic variants of each vowel.

Different analyses have proposed somewhat different vowel inventories and features for Somali, depending on the set of speakers whose dialects are studied. Up to four features may be phonologically distinctive: height, backness, tongue root, and length.

Saeed (1982) and Orwin (1994) both propose systems with five core vowels, but only Orwin's system makes a tongue root distinction. Gabbard (2010) proposes a system with six core vowels, with a tongue root distinction, but only on front vowels.

Vowels (based on Orwin's analysis)
	Front	Central	Back
High	i (Note: The short vowel i is sometimes lowered to a, for example; “Falastiin” Somali pronunciation: [falastiːn], lit. 'Palestine'. Also when we see “Sidee Tahay” Somali pronunciation: [sadĕː tahaj], lit. 'How are you?', it is clear that it is merely dialectical.) ⟨i⟩ iː ⟨ii⟩		u (Note: The short vowel u is sometimes lowered to a, for example; “Jamhuuriyadda” Somali pronunciation: [d͡ʒamhuːriyada], lit. 'Republic' but however, it is clear that it is merely dialectical southerly.) ⟨u⟩ uː ⟨uu⟩
Mid	e ⟨e⟩ eː ⟨ee⟩		o ⟨o⟩ oː ⟨oo⟩
Low		a ⟨a⟩ aː ⟨aa⟩	

Orwin argues that, in addition to the vowels listed above, each of these five vowels has a fronted (advanced tongue root) variant, based on the existence of minimal pairs such as:

- duul ("fly!") vs. du̘u̘l ("attack!")
- keen ("bring!") vs. ke̘e̘n ("he brought")

Somali monophthongs
	Front series		Back series	
	short	long	short	long
Close front unrounded / Near-close near-front unrounded	i	iː	ɪ	ɪː
Close-mid front unrounded / Open-mid front unrounded	e	eː	ɛ	ɛː
Near-open front unrounded / Open back unrounded	æ	æː	ɑ	ɑː
Open-mid central rounded / Open-mid back rounded	ɞ	ɞː	ɔ	ɔː
Close central rounded / Close back rounded	ʉ	ʉː	u	uː

Somali diphthongs
First element is front		First element is back	
short	long	short	long
æi	æːi	ɑɪ	ɑːɪ
æʉ	æːʉ	ɑu	ɑːu
ei	eːi	ɛɪ	ɛːɪ
ɞi	ɞːi	ɔɪ	ɔːɪ
ɞʉ	ɞːʉ	ɔu	ɔːu

Gabbard claims that only the front vowels (/i/ and /e/) have advanced variants, though his system includes a sixth vowel, /ɑ/. Both Orwin and Gabbard agree that the precise phonetic and phonological difference between the advanced and retracted tongue root vowels are unclear.

== Tone ==
Lexical prominence in Somali can be classified under a pitch accent system, in which there is one high-tone mora per word.

The tone system distinguishes both grammatical and lexical differences. Differences include numbers singular and plural (a grammatical distinction), and masculine and feminine genders (a grammatical and sometimes also lexical distinction). One example is inán ('girl') versus ínan ('boy'). This reflects a tonal pattern that codes grammatical gender, such as dameér ('female donkey') versus daméer ('male donkey').

The question of the tone system in Somali has been debated for decades. The modern consensus is as follows.

In Somali, the tone-bearing unit is the mora rather than the vowel of the syllable. A long vowel or a diphthong consists of two morae and can bear two tones. Each mora is defined as being of high or low tone. Only one high tone occurs per word and this must be on the final or penultimate mora. Particles do not have a high tone. (These include prepositions, clitic pronouns for subject and object, impersonal subject pronouns and focus markers.) There are therefore three possible "accentual patterns" in word roots.

Phonetically there are three tones on long vowels: high, low and falling:

1. On a long vowel or diphthong, a sequence of high-low is realised as a falling tone.
2. On a long vowel or diphthong, a sequence of low-high is realised as high-high. (Occasionally, it is a rising tone.)

This use of tone may be characterized as pitch accent. It is similar to that in Oromo.

Stress is connected with tone. The high tone has strong stress; the falling tone has less stress and the low tone has no stress.

When needed, the conventions for marking tone on written Somali are as follows:

- acute accent for high tone
- grave accent for low tone
- circumflex for falling tone

== Phonotactics ==
The syllable structure of Somali is (C)V(C).

Root morphemes usually have a mono- or disyllabic structure.

Clusters of two consonants do not occur word-initially or word-finally, i.e., they only occur at syllable boundaries. The following consonants can be geminate: /b/, /d/, /ɖ/, /ɡ/, /ɢ/, /m/, /n/, /r/ and /l/. The following cannot be geminate: /t/, /k/ and the fricatives.

Two vowels cannot occur together at syllable boundaries. Epenthetic consonants, e.g. [j] and [ʔ], are therefore inserted.

== Sandhi ==
Phonological changes occur at morpheme boundaries (sandhi) for specific grammatical morphemes. There may be assimilation or elision. One unusual change which can occur is /lt/ to [ʃ] (compare Spanish mucho from Latin multus).

Coalescence also occurs. This is a kind of external sandhi in which words join, undergoing phonological processes such as elision.

== Vowel harmony ==
Roots have front-back vowel harmony. There is also a process of vowel harmony in strings longer than a word, known as "harmonic groups".

== Prosody ==
Intonation (as opposed to tone, see above) does not carry grammatical information, although it may convey the speaker's attitude or emotion.

== Bibliography ==
- Gabbard, Kevin (2010). A Phonological Analysis of Somali and the Guttural Consonants (PDF) (BA Linguistics Honors Thesis). hdl:1811/46639.
- Nilsson, Morgan, and Laura J. Downing. "Somali vowel qualities and vowel harmony domains." In North Atlantic Conference on Afroasiatic Linguistics (NACAL 47), Paris, France, June, pp. 24–26. 2019.
- Saeed, John Ibrahim (1993). Somali Reference Grammar. Kensington, Maryland: Dunwoody Press. ISBN 978-0931745973.
- Saeed, John Ibrahim (1999). Somali. Amsterdam: John Benjamins, B.V. ISBN 90-272-3810-3.
