= Cuentos del Sil =

Leonese language book

- Author: Severiano Álvarez; Alejandro Díez; Daniel Fernández; Eva González; Roberto González-Quevedo; Xuasús González; Félix Llópez; Adrianu Martín; Abel Pardo
- Language: Leonese

Cuentos del Sil (Tales of the Sil) is a Leonese language book written by nine Leonese language writers. It was sponsored by the provincial government of León, and two Leonese language associations: El Fueyu and El Toralín. The authors came from the Sil valley, especially from El Bierzo (León).

The writers, who ranged from teenagers to people who were in their eighties, and from those who had a native competence in Leonese language to those who only had a poor knowledge of it, were these:

- Severiano Álvarez
- Alejandro Díez
- Daniel Fernández
- Eva González
- Roberto González-Quevedo
- Xuasús González
- Félix Llópez
- Adrianu Martín
- Abel Pardo

== See also ==
- Leonese language
- Leonese language writers
