= Palacios del Sil =

Palacios del Sil, Spain
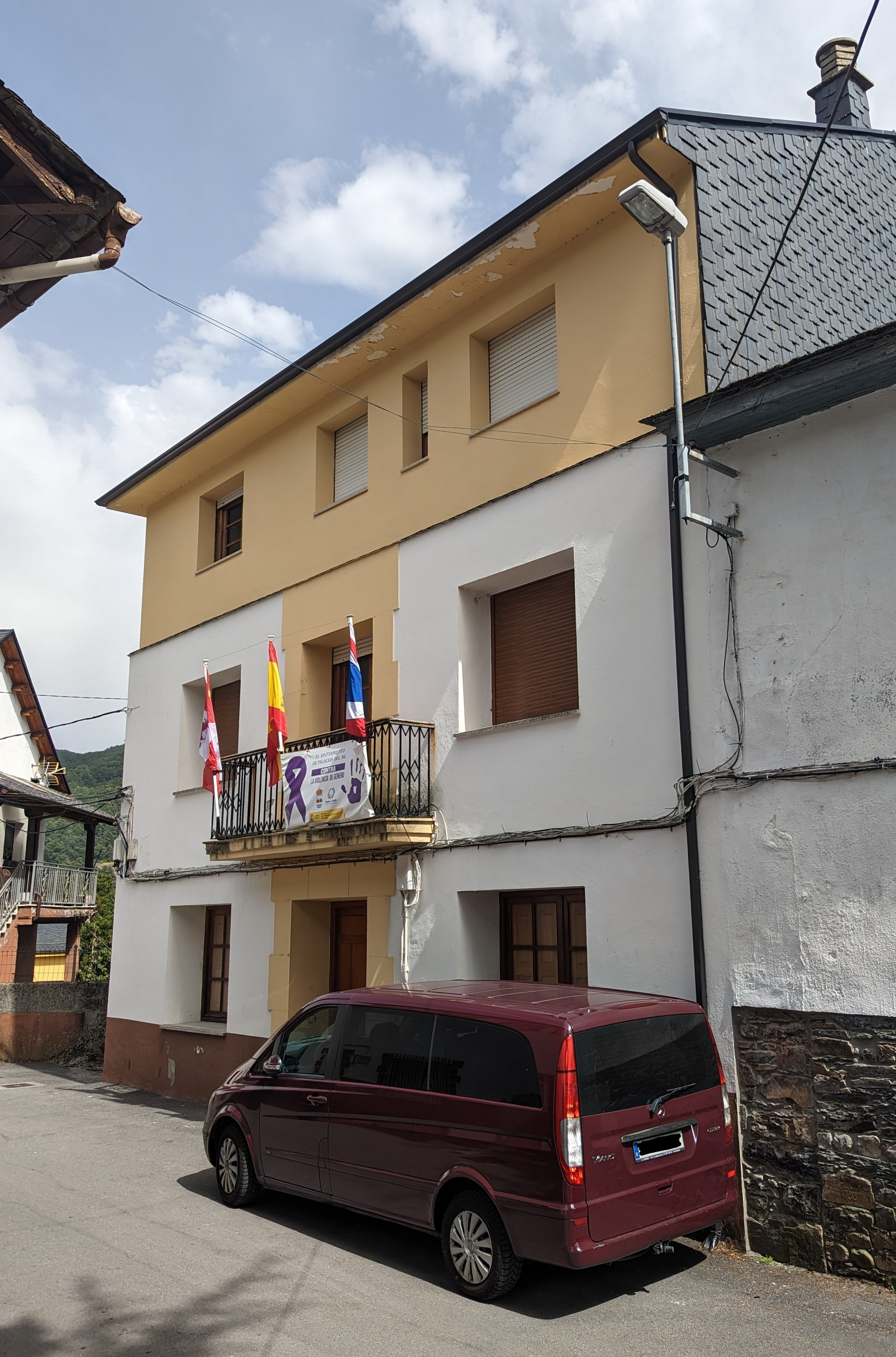

- Flag Coat of arms
- Interactive map of Palacios del Sil, Spain
- Coordinates: 42°53′N 6°26′W
- Country: Spain
- Autonomous community: Castile and León
- Province: León
- Region: El Bierzo
- Municipality: Palacios del Sil

Area
  - Total: 182 km^{2} (70 sq mi)

Population (2025-01-01)
  - Total: 862
  - Density: 4.74/km^{2} (12.3/sq mi)
- Time zone: UTC+1 (CET)
  - Summer (DST): UTC+2 (CEST)
- Climate: Csb

Palacios del Sil is a village and municipality located in the region of El Bierzo (province of León, Castile and León, Spain). According to the 2004 census (INE), the municipality has a population of 1,373 inhabitants. Palacios del Sil is also a village.

== Notable people ==
Some of the most known writers in asturleonés language have their origin in this municipality, as Eva González, Roberto González-Quevedo or Severiano Álvarez.

== See also ==
- El Bierzo
