= San Pedro de Pegas =

- Locality
- Location within Province of León Location within Castile and León Location within Spain
- Coordinates: 42°27′2″N 5°52′31″W
- Country: Spain
- Autonomous community: Castile and León
- Province: Province of León
- Municipality: Bustillo del Páramo
- Elevation: 821 m (2,694 ft)

Population
  - Total: 87

San Pedro de Pegas is a locality located in the municipality of Bustillo del Páramo, in the province of León, Castile and León, Spain. As of 2020, it has a population of 87.

== Geography ==
San Pedro de Pegas is located 37km west-southwest of León, Spain.
