= Omañese =

Romance language dialects

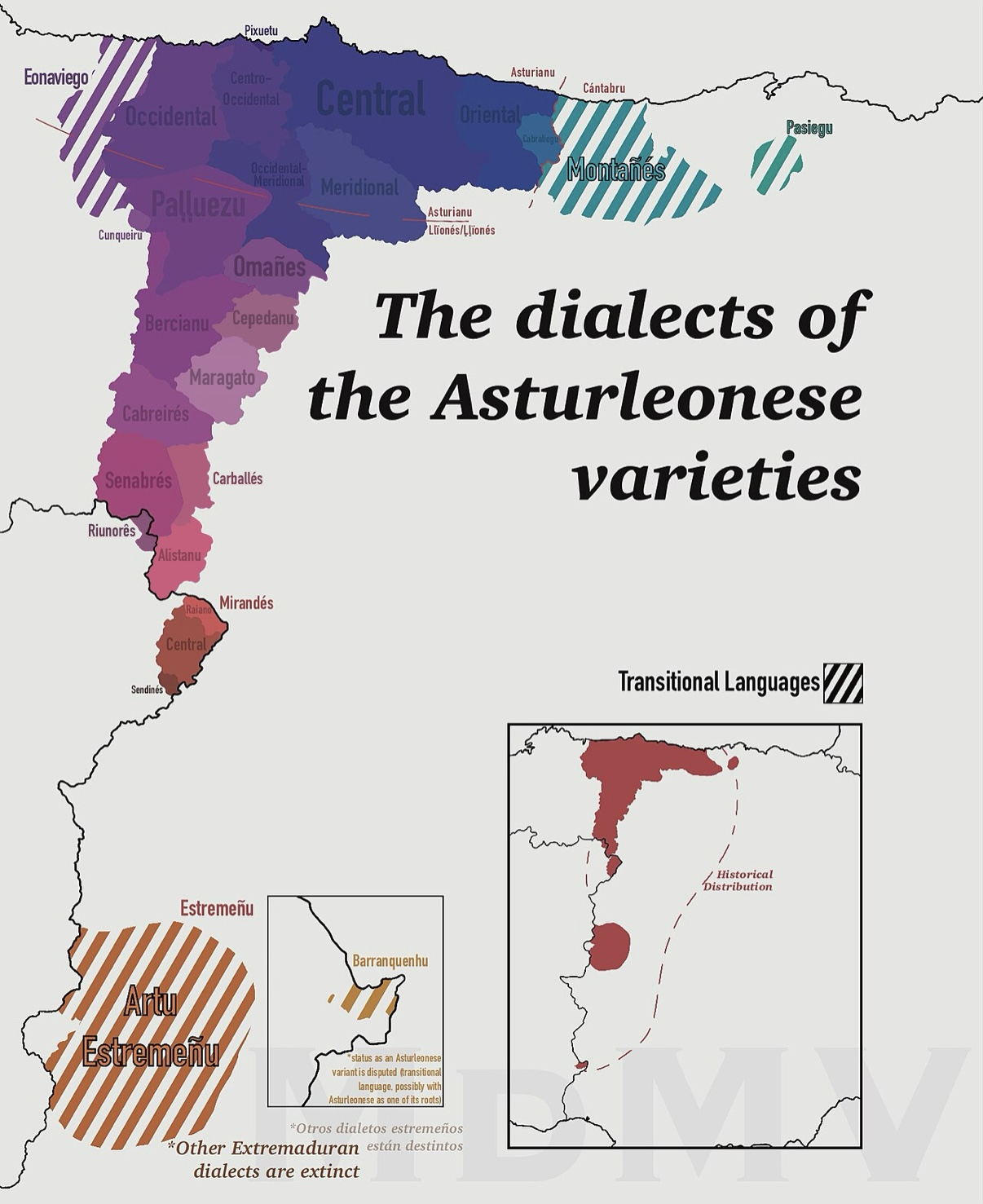

Omañese dialects are varieties of Leonese language spoken in the comarca of Omaña in Castile and León, Spain. Omañese dialects form part of Western Asturleonese.
