= Acebes del Páramo =

- Locality
- Location within Province of León Location within Castile and León Location within Spain
- Coordinates: 42°26′30″N 5°50′39″W
- Country: Spain
- Autonomous community: Castile and León
- Province: Province of León
- Municipality: Bustillo del Páramo
- Elevation: 825 m (2,707 ft)

Population
  - Total: 154

Acebes del Páramo is a locality located in the municipality of Bustillo del Páramo, in the province of León, Castile and León, Spain. As of 2020, it has a population of 154.

== Geography ==
Acebes del Páramo is located 35km southwest of León.
