= Grisuela del Páramo =

- Location within Spain
- Coordinates: 42°24′47″N 5°47′9″W
- Country: Spain
- Region: Castile and León
- Province: León
- Founded: 12th century
- Elevation: 840 m (2,760 ft)

Population (2009)
  - Total: 175
- Postal code: 24357
- Website: Ayuntamiento de Bustillo del Páramo

Grisuela del Páramo is a village belonging to the Bustillo del Páramo municipality, the province of León, Castile and León, Spain. According to the 2009 census (INE), it has a population of 175 inhabitants.

The Church of Grisuela del Páramo is an outstanding building listed as Bien de Interés Cultural, "Property of special Cultural Interest", in Spain.

== Gallery ==
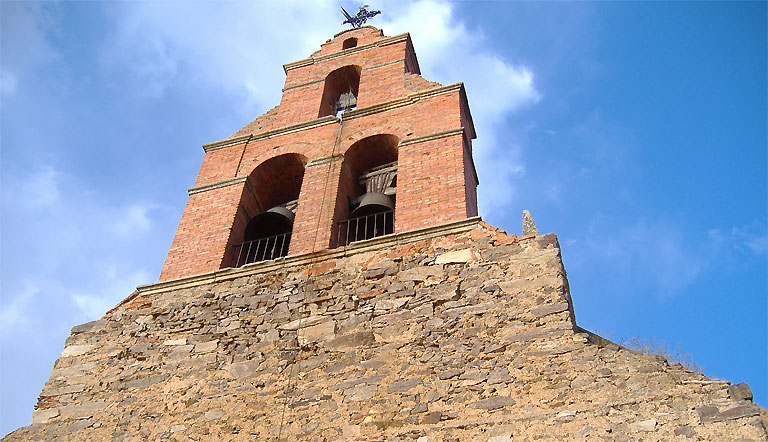
Bell-gable of the church of Grisuela del Páramo

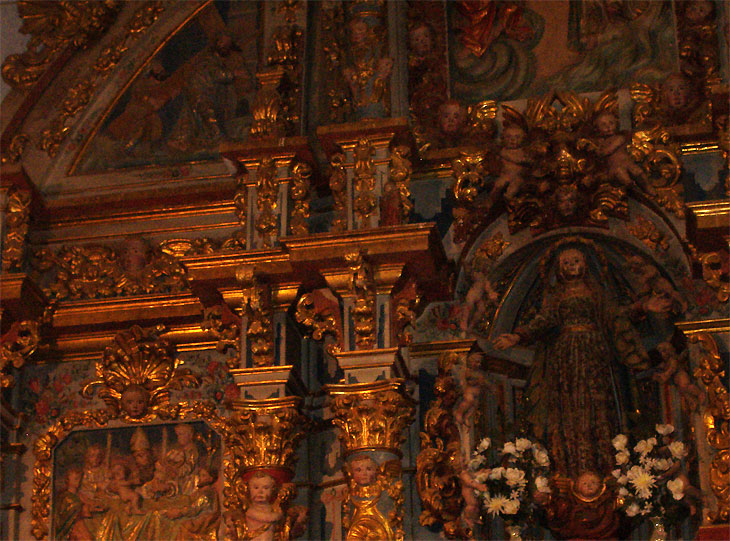
1777 retable of the Church

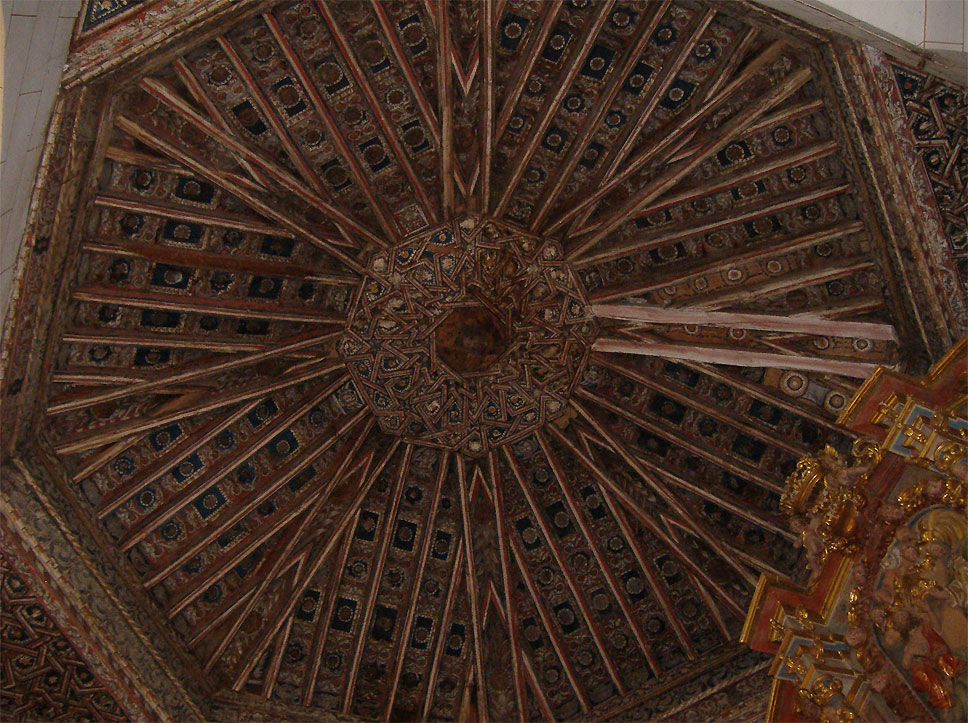
Moorish-style ceiling

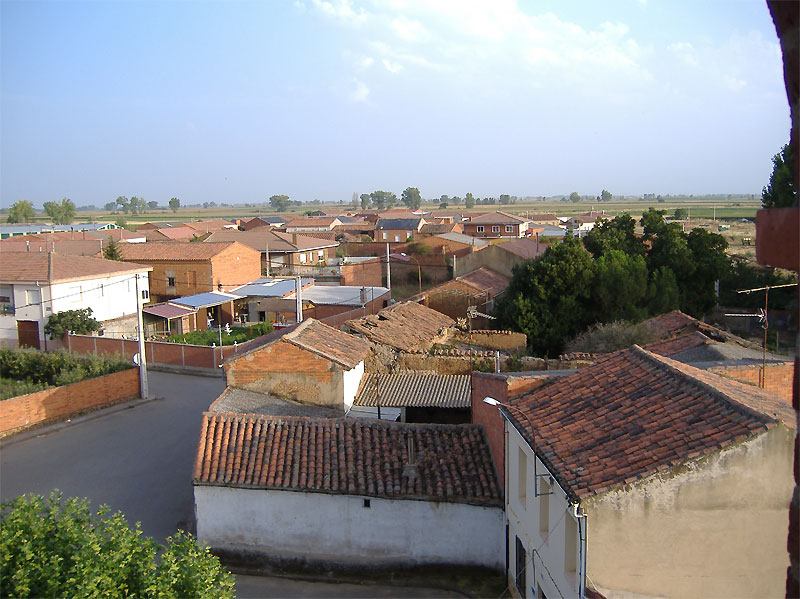
View of Grisuela del Páramo
