= Matalobos del Páramo =

- Locality
- Location within Province of León Location within Castile and León Location within Spain
- Coordinates: 42°25′7″N 5°48′59″W
- Country: Spain
- Autonomous community: Castile and León
- Province: Province of León
- Municipality: Bustillo del Páramo
- Elevation: 824 m (2,703 ft)

Population
  - Total: 184

Matalobos del Páramo is a hamlet located in the municipality of Bustillo del Páramo, in the province of León, Castile and León, Spain. As of 2020, it has a population of 184.

== Geography ==
Matalobos del Páramo is located 39km southwest of León, Spain.
