= La Milla del Páramo =

- Locality
- Location within Province of León Location within Castile and León Location within Spain
- Coordinates: 42°28′3″N 5°48′1″W
- Country: Spain
- Autonomous community: Castile and León
- Province: Province of León
- Municipality: Bustillo del Páramo
- Elevation: 855 m (2,805 ft)

Population
  - Total: 177

La Milla del Páramo is a locality located in the municipality of Bustillo del Páramo, in the province of León, Castile and León, Spain. As of 2020, it has a population of 177.

== Geography ==
La Milla del Páramo is located 29km southwest of León, Spain.
