= Antoñanes del Páramo =

- Locality
- Location within Province of León Location within Castile and León Location within Spain
- Coordinates: 42°24′14″N 5°47′22″W
- Country: Spain
- Autonomous community: Castile and León
- Province: Province of León
- Municipality: Bustillo del Páramo
- Elevation: 820 m (2,690 ft)

Population
  - Total: 91

Antoñanes del Páramo is a locality located in the municipality of Bustillo del Páramo, in the province of León, Castile and León, Spain. As of 2020, it has a population of 91.

== Geography ==
Antoñanes del Páramo is located 36km southwest of León, Spain.
