= Severiano Álvarez =

Severiano Álvarez (1933 – September 23, 2013) was a Leonese language writer. He was born in Cuevas del Sil (in the municipality of Palacios del Sil), province of León. He had two mentions in Leonese language in their region variety in 1982 and 1983, and was awarded with two more in 1983. He died on September 23, 2013, aged 80.

== Books ==
- Cousas de Aiquí (1987)

== Collective books ==
- Cuentos del Sil (2006)
- El Dialecto Leonés (2006)

== See also ==
- List of Leonese language writers
