= Caitano Bardón =

Leonese language writer

Cayetano Álvarez Bardón (1881–1924) was a Leonese language writer. His work "Cuentos en Dialecto Leonés" was one of the first books written in the Leonese language in the 20th century.

A street in León was named in Bardón's honour, to commemorate his contributions to literature in Leonese.

== Works ==
- Cuentos en Dialecto Leonés (1907)

== See also ==
- List of Leonese language writers
