= Asociación de Profesores y Monitores de Llingua Llïonesa =

Leonese language association

The Asociación de Profesores y Monitores en Llingua Llïonesa or APMLL (Leonese Language Teachers and Monitor Association) is a Leonese language association where are integrated the teachers and monitors that teach this language. It was founded in 2007 in Leon, Castile and Leon, Spain, and has members from the provinces of Llión, Zamora and Salamanca.

== Activities ==
They have participated in several activities for promoting Leonese language, as Leonese language Day in 2008 or the Mother Language Day in 2009, where they signed a communicate with the Leonese language associations for promoting this language.

== See also ==
- Leonese language
- Leonese language writers
