= Bercian dialect =

Bercian is the generic name of the linguistic varieties spoken in El Bierzo region, in the province of León, Spain. They belong to the dialect continuum of Romance languages in northern Spain, linking the Galician and Leonese languages. Many of these varieties are on the brink of disappearing.

== Written references ==
The first written references dealing with the local speech like Bercian dialect correspond to the middle of the 19th century in Isidoro Andrés de Llano's work, Remembrance of Puentedeume in Bercian dialect, 1860, published in the Esla journal. In 1861, Antonio Fernandez Morales wrote upon Mariano Cubí's (co-author) request, in Bercian dialect: Ensaios Poéticos en Dialecto Berciano.

Nowadays it has almost disappeared, surviving in many expressions of daily use. Local expressions and vocabulary have been gathered in several works, the most interesting ones being those made by Luís A. Pastrana and David Lopez, at the beginning of the 1970s, with a sketch of the morphology and syntax of the dialect and one interesting dictionary of expressions and words, and Manuel Gutiérrez Tuñón's doctoral thesis "The Speech of El Bierzo", published in 1975.

== Classifications ==
El Bierzo has always been considered a bridge between Galicia and Leon province; but with salient particular features, which led to defining this speech of El Bierzo as Bercian dialect in the 19th century, being considered part of the Galician linguistic domain by Antonio Fernández Morales in 1861 and part of the Leonese linguistic domain by Ramón Menéndez Pidal, the latter stating that the dividing line between Leonese and Galician should be placed between the basins of the Cúa and Sil rivers. In 1934, Verardo García Rey gathered the vocabulary of the Bercian dialect in the publication: Vocabulario de El Bierzo, where the author makes clear that after his fieldwork, he would re-place the dividing line between the Asturleonese and the Galician-Portuguese linguistic groups, setting it strictly along the Sil river. Jesús García y García, in 1994, places the mentioned line from the high Cúa river up to a place in Ponferrada's municipality (Dehesas, Fuentesnuevas).

== External links / Further reading ==
- El gallego-leonés de Ancares y su interés para la dialectología portuguesa. Dámaso Alonso y García Yebra.
- L'Asturianu n'El Bierzu. Apropósitu del ALBI, Ana Mª Cano en "Lletres Asturianes" Boletín Oficial de la ALLA.
- La Fala de Palacios de Sil, Roberto González-Quevedo; Academia de la Llingua Asturiana.
- Aspeutos fónicos na fala de Forniella; Héctor García Xil en Lletres Asturianes, Alla.
- Cruce de dialectos en el habla de San Pedro de Olleros, Alfredo Álvarez Díaz en "Lletres Asturianes".
- Ensayos poeticos en dialecto berciano Autor Antonio Fernandez y Morales, Mariano Cubí y Soler . Google books
