= Eva González (writer) =

Spanish writer (1918–2007)

Eva González Fernández (17 January 1918 – 25 April 2007) was a Leonese language writer; she was born in Palacios del Sil (León Province, Spain) in 1918 and died in León in 2007. She has a dedicated street in León by her contribution to the literature in Leonese.

== Selected works ==
- Poesías ya cuentus na nuesa tsingua (1980).
- Bitsarón. Cousas pa nenos y pa grandes na nuesa tsingua (1981).
- Xentiquina (1983).
- Xeitus: poesías ya cuentus (1985).
- Branas d'antanu ya xente d'anguanu: poesías ya cuentus (1990) reedited (2003)

=== Collective books ===
- Cuentos de Lleón (1996)
- Cuentos del Sil (2006)
- El Dialecto Leonés, edición conmemorativa (2006)

== See also ==
- Leonese language
- List of Leonese language writers
- Kingdom of León
- Cuentos del Sil
