= Riberan dialect =

Dialect of Leonese spoken in Salamanca

Riberan
- Native to: Spain
- Region: La Ribera
- Language family: Indo-European: Italic; Latino-Faliscan; Latin; Romance; Italo-Western; Western; Ibero-Romance; West Iberian; Asturleonese; Eastern Astur-Leonese; Riberan
- Early forms: Old Latin: Vulgar Latin; Proto-Romance; Old Leonese

Language codes
- ISO 639-3: –

The Riberan dialect, also known as Reviran, Arribenian, or Riberenian, was a dialect of Eastern Astur-Leonese spoken in the north-western region of La Ribera in the province of Salamanca, in the autonomous community of Castile and León. It has since been replaced by Castilian as the sole language of the region.

It was known for being extremely similar to the Sayaguese dialect of Zamora and the Mirandese language spoken in several Portuguese municipalities which include Miranda do Douro.
