= Voiceless pharyngeal fricative =

Consonantal sound represented by ⟨ħ⟩ in IPA

ħ
- IPA number: 144

Audio sample
- source · help

Encoding
- Entity (decimal): &#295;
- Unicode (hex): U+0127
- X-SAMPA: X\
- Braille: ⠖ (braille pattern dots-235) ⠓ (braille pattern dots-125)
Image

A voiceless pharyngeal fricative is a type of consonantal sound, used in some spoken languages. The symbol in the International Phonetic Alphabet that represents this sound is an h with stroke, ⟨ħ⟩. In the transcription of Arabic, Berber (and other Afro-Asiatic languages) as well as a few other scripts, it is often written ⟨Ḥ⟩, ⟨ḥ⟩.

It is typically characterized as fricative in the upper pharynx, similar to [h], except that the latter is placed at the glottis instead.

== Features ==
Features of a voiceless pharyngeal fricative:

- Its manner of articulation is fricative, which means it is produced by constricting air flow through a narrow channel at the place of articulation, causing turbulence.
- Its place of articulation is pharyngeal, which means it is articulated with the tongue root against the back of the throat (the pharynx).
- Its phonation is voiceless, which means it is produced without vibrations of the vocal cords. In some languages the vocal cords are actively separated, so it is always voiceless; in others the cords are lax, so that it may take on the voicing of adjacent sounds.
- It is an oral consonant, which means that air is not allowed to escape through the nose.
- It is a median consonant, which means it is produced by directing the airstream down the midline of the tongue, rather than to the sides.
- Its airstream mechanism is pulmonic, which means it is articulated by pushing air only with the intercostal muscles and abdominal muscles, as in most speech sounds.

== Occurrence ==
This sound is the most commonly cited realization of the Semitic letter hēth, which occurs in all dialects of Arabic, Classical Syriac, Western Neo-Aramaic, Central Neo-Aramaic, Ge'ez, Tigre, Tigrinya as well as Biblical, Mishnaic and Mizrahi Hebrew. It has also been reconstructed as appearing in Ancient Egyptian, a related Afro-Asiatic language. Assyrian Neo-Aramaic, Ashkenazi Hebrew and most speakers of Modern Hebrew have merged the voiceless pharyngeal fricative with the voiceless velar (or uvular) fricative. However, phonetic studies have shown that the so-called voiceless pharyngeal fricatives of Semitic languages are often neither pharyngeal (but rather epiglottal) nor fricatives (but rather approximants).

Language		Word	IPA	Meaning	Notes
Abaza		хIахъвы/kh'akh"vy	[ħaqʷə]	'stone'	
Abkhaz		ҳара/khara	[ħaˈra]	'we'	See Abkhaz phonology
Adyghe		тхьэ/tkh'ė/ﺗﺤﻪ	[tħa]	'god'	
Afar		dalcu	[dʌlħu]	'striped hyena'	
Agul		мухI/mukh'	[muħ]	'barn'	
Amis		tuduh	[tuɮuħ]	'burn, roast'	Word-final allophone of /ʜ/.
Arabic	Standard	ﺣﺎل/ḥāl	[ħaːl]	'situation'	See Arabic phonology
Arabic	Essaouira	شلوح (šlūḥ)	[ʃlɵːħ]	'chleuh'	
Archi		хIал/kh'al	[ħal]	'state'	
Central Neo-Aramaic	Turoyo	ܡܫܝܚܐ (mšìḥo)	[mʃiːħɔ]	'Christ'	Corresponds with [x] in most other dialects.
Atayal		hiyan	[ħijan]	'in/at/on him/her/it'	
Avar		xIебецI/kh'ebets'/ﺣﯧﺒﯧﺾ	[ħeˈbetsʼ]	'earwax'	
Azerbaijani		əhdaş	[æħd̪ɑʃ]	'instrument'	
Breton	Sant-Nikolaz-ar-Pelem	dalc’hmat	[dæħˈmɑːt]	'always'	Corresponds with [x] or [h] in most other dialects.
Breton	Bro Gwened	bouc'h	[bo̞:ħ]	'goat'	Corresponds with [x] or [h] in most other dialects.
Chechen		xьач/ẋaç/ﺣﺎچ	[ħatʃ]	'plum'	
English	Some speakers, mostly of Received Pronunciation	horrible	[ħɒɹɪbəl]	'horrible'	Glottal [h] for other speakers. See English phonology
French	Some speakers	faire	[feː(ă)ħ]	'to do, to make'	
Galician	Some dialects	gato	[ˈħatʊ]	'cat'	Corresponds to /ɡ/ in other dialects. See Galician phonology and gheada
Hebrew	Mizrahi	חַשְׁמַל/ḥašmal	[ħaʃˈmal]	'electricity'	Merged with [χ] for most modern speakers. See Modern Hebrew phonology.
Hebrew	Temani	אֶחָדֿ/aḥoḏ	[æˈħɔð]	'one'	Yemenite pronunciation of the letter chet. Merged with /χ/ in most other dialects. See Yemenite Hebrew
Judeo-Spanish	Haketia	Ḥaketía	[ħakeˈti.a]	'Haketia'	Borrowed from Arabic and Hebrew
Judeo-Spanish	Jerusalem	ḥakura	[ħaˈkuɾa]	'small vegetable garden'	Borrowed from Arabic and Hebrew
Kabardian		кхъухь/ꝗvɦ/ٯّوح	[q͡χʷəħ]	'ship'	
Kabyle		ⴰⵃⴻⴼⴼⴰⴼ/aḥeffaf/اﺣـﻔﺎف	[aħəfːaf]	'hairdresser'	
Kullui			[biːħ]	'twenty'	/ħ/ historically derives from /s/ and occurs word-finally
Kurdish	Most speakers	ḧol	[ħol]	'environment'	Corresponds to /h/ in some Kurdish dialects
Leonese	Riberan	harina	[ħaˈɾi.na]	'flour'	
Maltese	Standard	wieħed	[wiːħet]	'one'	
Nuu-chah-nulth		ʔaap-ḥii	[ʔaːpˈħiː]	'friendly'	
Sioux	Nakota	haxdanahâ	[haħdanahã]	'yesterday'	
Somali		xood/ﺣٗﻮد/𐒄𐒝𐒆	[ħoːd]	'cane'	See Somali phonology
Tarifit		tameǧaḥt	[θæmədʒæħt]	'salt'	
Ukrainian		нігті/nihti	[ˈnʲiħtʲi]	'fingernails'	Allophone of /ʕ/ (which may be transcribed /ɦ/) before voiceless consonants; can be fronted to [x] in some "weak positions". See Ukrainian phonology

== See also ==
- Voiced pharyngeal fricative
- Heth
- Index of phonetics articles
- Guttural
- H with stroke

== Notes ==
Place →	Labial					Coronal										Dorsal					Laryngeal			
Manner ↓	Bilabial		Labiodental		Linguolabial		Dental		Alveolar		Postalveolar		Retroflex		(Alveolo-)palatal		Velar		Uvular		Pharyngeal/epiglottal		Glottal	
Nasal	m̥	m	ɱ̊	ɱ		n̼	n̪̊	n̪	n̥	n	n̠̊	n̠	ɳ̊	ɳ	ɲ̊	ɲ	ŋ̊	ŋ	ɴ̥	ɴ				
Plosive	p	b	p̪	b̪	t̼	d̼	t̪	d̪	t	d			ʈ	ɖ	c	ɟ	k	ɡ	q	ɢ	ʡ		ʔ	
Sibilant affricate							t̪s̪	d̪z̪	ts	dz	t̠ʃ	d̠ʒ	tʂ	dʐ	tɕ	dʑ								
Non-sibilant affricate	pɸ	bβ	p̪f	b̪v			t̪θ	d̪ð	tɹ̝̊	dɹ̝	t̠ɹ̠̊˔	d̠ɹ̠˔			cç	ɟʝ	kx	ɡɣ	qχ	ɢʁ	ʡʜ	ʡʢ	ʔh	
Sibilant fricative							s̪	z̪	s	z	ʃ	ʒ	ʂ	ʐ	ɕ	ʑ								
Non-sibilant fricative	ɸ	β	f	v	θ̼	ð̼	θ	ð	θ̠	ð̠	ɹ̠̊˔	ɹ̠˔	ɻ̊˔	ɻ˔	ç	ʝ	x	ɣ	χ	ʁ	ħ	ʕ	h	ɦ
Approximant		β̞		ʋ				ð̞		ɹ		ɹ̠		ɻ		j		ɰ						˷
Tap/flap		ⱱ̟		ⱱ					ɾ̥	ɾ			ɽ̊	ɽ						ɢ̆		ʡ̆		
Trill	ʙ̥	ʙ							r̥	r		r̠	ɽ̊r̥	ɽr					ʀ̥	ʀ	ʜ	ʢ		
Lateral affricate									tɬ	dɮ			tꞎ	d𝼅	c𝼆	ɟʎ̝	k𝼄	ɡʟ̝						
Lateral fricative							ɬ̪		ɬ	ɮ			ꞎ	𝼅	𝼆	ʎ̝	𝼄	ʟ̝						
Lateral approximant								l̪	l̥	l		l̠	ɭ̊	ɭ	ʎ̥	ʎ	ʟ̥	ʟ		ʟ̠				
Lateral tap/flap									ɺ̥	ɺ			𝼈̊	𝼈		ʎ̆		ʟ̆						

		BL	LD	D	A	PA	RF	P	V	U
Implosive	Voiced	ɓ			ɗ		ᶑ	ʄ	ɠ	ʛ
Implosive	Voiceless	ɓ̥			ɗ̥		ᶑ̊	ʄ̊	ɠ̊	ʛ̥
Ejective	Stop	pʼ			tʼ		ʈʼ	cʼ	kʼ	qʼ
Ejective	Affricate		p̪fʼ	tθʼ	tsʼ	tʃʼ	tʂʼ	tɕʼ	kxʼ	qχʼ
Ejective	Fricative	ɸʼ	fʼ	θʼ	sʼ	ʃʼ	ʂʼ	ɕʼ	xʼ	χʼ
Ejective	Lateral affricate				tɬʼ			c𝼆ʼ	k𝼄ʼ	q𝼄ʼ
Ejective	Lateral fricative				ɬʼ					
Click (top: velar; bottom: uvular)	Tenuis	kʘ qʘ		kǀ qǀ	kǃ qǃ		k𝼊 q𝼊	kǂ qǂ		
Click (top: velar; bottom: uvular)	Voiced	ɡʘ ɢʘ		ɡǀ ɢǀ	ɡǃ ɢǃ		ɡ𝼊 ɢ𝼊	ɡǂ ɢǂ		
Click (top: velar; bottom: uvular)	Nasal	ŋʘ ɴʘ		ŋǀ ɴǀ	ŋǃ ɴǃ		ŋ𝼊 ɴ𝼊	ŋǂ ɴǂ	ʞ	
Click (top: velar; bottom: uvular)	Tenuis lateral				kǁ qǁ					
Click (top: velar; bottom: uvular)	Voiced lateral				ɡǁ ɢǁ					
Click (top: velar; bottom: uvular)	Nasal lateral				ŋǁ ɴǁ					
