= List of Leonese-language writers =

This is a list of writers who have worked in the Leonese language (Llingua Llïonesa in Leonese), a language developed from Vulgar Latin with contributions from the pre-Roman languages which were spoken in the territory of the Spanish provinces of León, Zamora, and Salamanca and in some villages in the District of Bragança, Portugal. The Leonese language belongs to the Leonese or Astur-Leonese subgroup of Iberian languages.

- Caitano Bardón (1881–1924)
- Eva González (1918–2007)
- Severiano Álvarez (born 1933)

== See also ==
- Leonese language
- Cuentos del Sil
