= Leonese language =

Set of certain vernacular Romance dialects

Leonese
- Llionés, Ḷḷionés, Lionés
- Native to: Spain, Portugal
- Region: Provinces of León (north and west), Zamora (north-west) in Castilla y León, in Spain, and the parishes of Riudenor (Rio de Onor) and Deilon (Deilão) in northeastern Portugal.
- Ethnicity: Leonese
- Native speakers: 20,000–50,000 (2008)
- Language family: Indo-European: Italic; Latino-Faliscan; Latin; Romance; Italo-Western; Western; Ibero-Romance; West Iberian; Asturleonese; Leonese
- Early forms: Old Latin: Vulgar Latin; Proto-Romance; Old Leonese
- Dialects: Bercian; Paḷḷuezu; Sayaguese; Cabreirese; Riberan; Fala de Ḷḷuna; Cepedan; Omañese; Senabrese

Official status
- Recognised minority language in: Castile and León (Spain)

Language codes
- ISO 639-2: ast
- ISO 639-3: ast
- Glottolog: leon1250
- Linguasphere: 51-AAA-cc
- IETF: ast-u-sd-escl
- Astur-Leonese is classified as Definitely Endangered by the UNESCO Atlas of the World's Languages in Danger

A man speaking Leonese.

Leonese (llionés, ḷḷionés, lionés) is a set of vernacular Romance language varieties spoken in northern and western portions of the historical region of León in Spain (the modern provinces of León, Zamora, and Salamanca), the village of Riudenore (in both Spain and Portugal) and Guadramil in Portugal, sometimes considered another language. In the past, it was spoken in a wider area, including most of the historical region of Leon. The current number of Leonese speakers is estimated at 20,000 to 50,000. Spanish is now the predominant language in the area.

Leonese forms part of the Asturleonese linguistic group along with dialects of Asturian. The division between Asturian and Leonese is extra-linguistic, as the main divisions within the Asturleonese complex are between eastern and western varieties, rather than between varieties spoken in Asturias and Leon.

== Name ==
Menéndez Pidal used "Leonese" for the entire linguistic area, including Asturias. This designation has been replaced by Ibero-Romance scholars with "Asturian-Leonese", but "Leonese" is still often used to denote Asturian-Leonese by non-speakers of Asturian or Mirandese. Sometimes the language as a whole is simply called "Asturian" for several reasons, such as the Leonese dialects being on the brink of extinction, or the widespread ignorance of its very existence (even in León), as well as their lack of recognition and institutional support (as opposed to their Asturias counterparts).

== Leonese and Asturleonese ==
In a narrow geographical sense, Leonese is distinct from the dialects grouped under the Asturian language. However, the division between Leonese and Asturian is due to the distinctly different identities of both areas, separated by a mighty mountain range, while the dialects have enough common traits to consider them part of a single language, Astur-Leonese or Asturian-Leonese. The principal isoglosses in this region do not divide Asturias and Leon, dialectal areas (western, central, eastern) are in fact shaped along a north-south axis (thus encompassing lands both north and south of the mountains, both in Asturias and in Castile and León). In the west of Asturias and Leon, dialects of Asturo-Leonese begin to transition into the closely related Galician language, with the westernmost variants effectively constituting dialects of Galician.

On the other hand, Menéndez Pidal and fellow scholars discussed a "Leonese language" descending from Latin and encompassing two groups: the Asturian dialects on one hand, and dialects spoken in the provinces of León and Zamora in Spain and a related dialect in Trás-os-Montes (Portugal), on the other hand.

The Asturleonese dialect (considered part of the Leonese dialects) of Miranda do Douro (Portugal), Mirandese, is most certainly a dialect on its own, considering the numerous differences it has when compared to dialects in the Spanish side. In fact, it is often considered as a separate language, especially in Portugal, where it has been granted official recognition, and is regulated by the Institute of the Mirandese Language. Thus, Asturleonese is sometimes considered a group of two languages, Asturian or Asturleonese proper, and Mirandese.

Unlike Asturian, which is regulated by the Academy of the Asturian Language (ALLA) and promoted by the Asturian Government and local legislation, the Leonese dialects are not officially promoted or regulated.

== Linguistic description ==
=== Phonology ===
Leonese consonants
		Labial	Dental	Alveolar	Palatal	Velar
Nasal		m		n	ɲ	
Plosive	voiceless	p	t		tʃ	k
Plosive	voiced	b	d		ʝ~j	g
Fricative		f	θ	s	ʃ	
Lateral				l	ʎ	
Flap				ɾ		
Trill				r		

Leonese vowels
	Front	Central	Back
Close	i		u
Mid	e		o
Open		a	

In Leonese, any of five vowel phonemes, /a, e, i, o, u/, may occur in stressed position. In the unstressed positions, the distinction between close and mid vowels is neutralized in favor of the archiphonemes /ɪ/ and /ʊ/.

=== Grammar ===
Leonese has two genders (masculine and feminine) and two numbers (singular and plural). The main masculine noun and adjective endings are -u for singular and -os for plural. Typical feminine endings are -a for singular and -as for plural. Masculine and feminine nouns ending in -e in the singular take -es for the plural.

==== Adjectives ====
Adjectives agree with nouns in number and gender.

=== Comparative table ===
Evolution from Latin to Portuguese, Galician, Astur and Leonese, Mirandese and Castilian
Gloss	Latin	Portuguese	Galician	Asturian/Leonese	Mirandese	Spanish
Gloss	Diphthongization of ŏ and ĕ					
door	pŏrta(m)	porta	porta	puerte	puorta	puerta
eye	ŏc(u)lu(m)	olho	ollo	güeyu güechu	uolho	ojo
time	tĕmpu(m)	tempo	tempo	tiempu	tiempo	tiempo
land	tĕrra(m)	terra	terra	tierre	tierra	tierra
	Falling diphthongs					
thing	causa(m)	cousa coisa	cousa	co(u)sa	cousa	cosa
blacksmith	ferrariu(m)	ferreiro	ferreiro	ferre(i)ru	ferreiro	herrero
	Initial n-					
Christmas	natal(is) nativitate(m)	natal	nadal	Nnatal/Nnadal	natal	navidad
	Initial f-					
make	facere	fazer	facer	facer	fazer	hacer
iron	fĕrru(m)	ferro	ferro	fierro	fierro	hierro
	Initial l-					
fireplace	lare(m)	lar	lar	llar ḷḷar	lhar	lar
wolf	lupu(m)	lobo	lobo	llubu l.l.ubu	lhobo	lobo
	Initial pl-, cl-, fl-					
flat	planu(m)	chão	chan chao	chanu llanu	chano	llano
key	clave(m)	chave	chave	chave llave	chabe	llave
flame	flamma(m)	chama	chama	'flama llama	chama	llama
	Intervocalic -n-					
frog	rana(m)	rã	ra(n)	xaronca	rana	rana
	-ct- and -lt-					
made	factu(m)	feito	feito	feitu fecho	feito	hecho
night	nŏcte(m)	noite	noite	nueite nueche	noute	noche
much	mŭltu(m)	muito	moito muito	muitu mueitu muncho	muito	mucho
listen	auscultāre	escutar	escoitar escuitar	escuitare escueitare escuchar	scuitar	escuchar
	-c’l-, -t’l-, -g’l-					
razor	novac(u)la(m)	navalha	navalla	ñavaya	nabalha	navaja
old	vet(u)lu(m)	velho	vello	vieyu, viiyu viechu	bielho	viejo
tile	teg(u)la(m)	telha	tella	teya	telha	teja
	-lj-					
woman	muliere(m)	mulher	muller	muyer, moyer mucher	mulhier	mujer
	-ll-					
castle	castellu(m)	castelo	castelo	castiellu castieḷḷu	castielho	castillo
	Intervocalic -l-					
ice / to frost	gelu(m) gelare	gelo (Note: Latinate borrowing, the shift applies otherwise mostly regularly in the language) gear	xeo xear	xelu		hielo
fern	filictu(m)	feto	fieito, fento	feleitu, felechu feichu	feleito	helecho
	-m'n-					
man	hom(i)ne(m)	homem	home	home	home	hombre
hunger, famine	fam(i)ne(m)	fome	fame	fame	fame	hambre
fire	lum(i)ne(m)	lume	lume	llume ḷḷume	lhume	lumbre

== Historical, social and cultural aspects ==
=== History ===
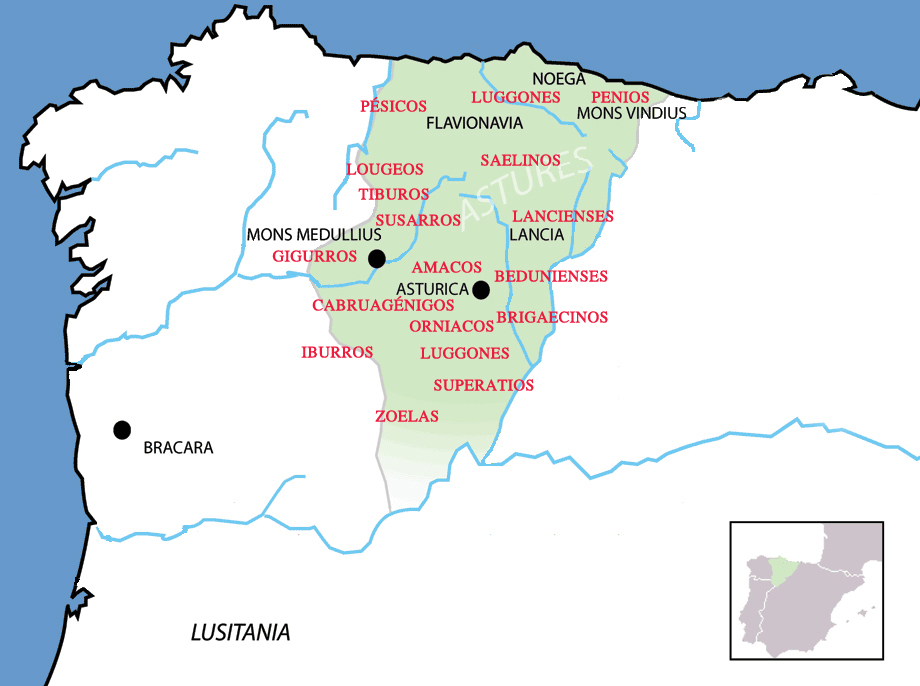
Conventus Asturum in the first century BC

The Leonese Romance language expanded into new territories of the Kingdom of León.

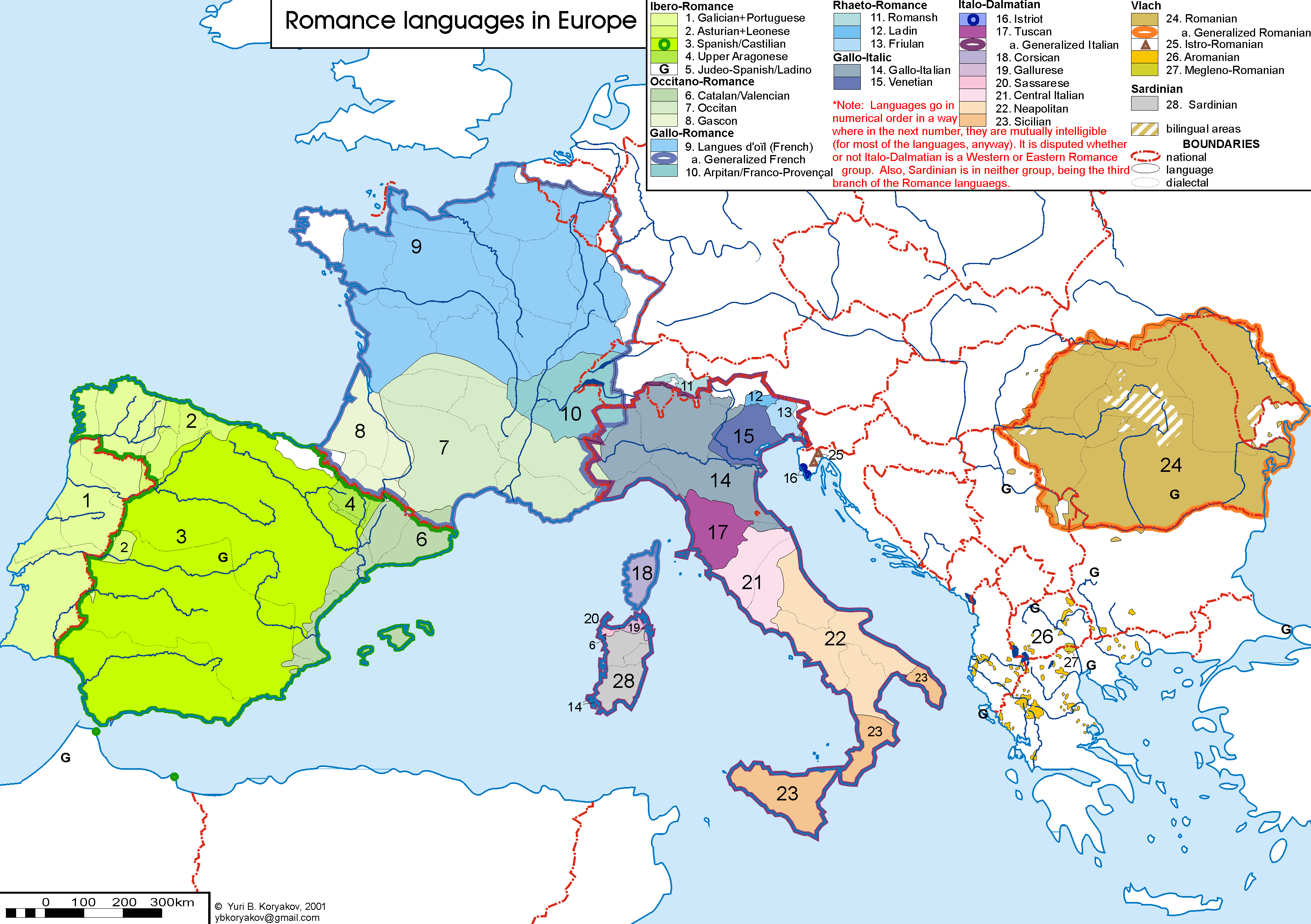
Atlas of 20th-century European Romance languages

The native languages of Leon, Zamora, Asturias, and the Terra de Miranda in Portugal are the result of the evolution of Latin introduced by Roman conquerors in the region. Their colonization and organization led to the Conventus Asturum, with its capital at Asturica Augusta (present-day Astorga, Spain, the centre of Romanization for the indigenous tribes).

The city of Astorga was sacked by the Visigoths in the 5th century, and never regained its former prominence. The region remained unified until the eighth-century Islamic invasion. Around the 11th century, it began to be defined as Leonese territory roughly corresponding to the southern conventus. In medieval León, the Romance Galician, Asturian-Leonese, and Castilian languages evolved and spread south.

The first known text in Asturian-Leonese is the Nodicia de kesos, written between 974 and 980 AD, an inventory of cheeses owned by a monastery written in the margin of the reverse of a document written in Latin. During the 12th and 13th centuries, Leonese reached its territorial zenith as the administrative language of the Kingdom of León, a literary language (Poema de Elena y María and the Libro de Alexandre), in the Leonese court, judiciary (with the translation of the Visigothic Liber Iudicum or Liber Iudiciorum into Leonese), administration, and organization.

After the 1230 union of Leon and Castile, Leonese had greater written and institutional use, although at the end of the 13th century Castilian began to replace it as a written language. Leonese became an oral, rural language with little literary development.

At the beginning of the 20th century, it survived in oral form only in mid-western León and western Zamora provinces. Its scientific study and a nascent cultural movement began in the province of Leon in 1906. During the 1950s and 60s, the number of Leonese speakers and the area in which it was spoken decreased.

=== Use and distribution ===
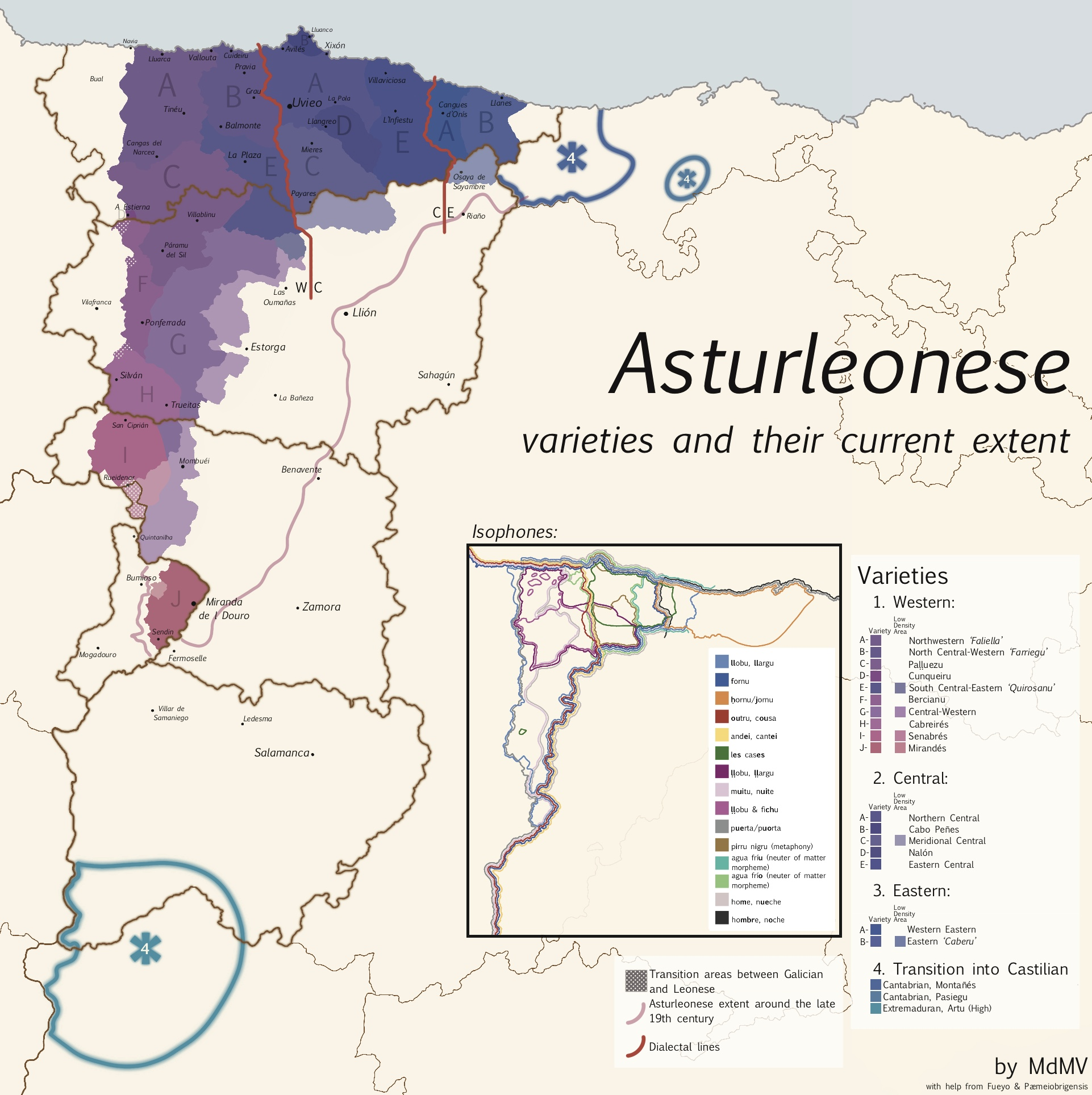
Varieties of Asturleonese and their current extent

Although the Astur-Leonese linguistic domain covers most of the principality of Asturias, the north and west of the province of Leon, the northeast of Zamora, both provinces in Castile and León, and the region of Miranda do Douro in the east of the Portuguese district of Bragança, this article focuses on the autonomous community of Castile and León. Borrego Nieto wrote that the area in where Leonese is best preserved, defined as "area 1", consists of the regions of Babia and Laciana, part of Los Argüellos, eastern Bierzo and La Cabrera; in Zamora, non-Galician Sanabria.

Borrego Nieto describes another geographical circle, which he calls "area 2", where Leonese is fading: " ... It is extended to the regions between the interior area and the Ribera del Órbigo (Maragatería, Cepeda, Omaña ... ). In Zamora, the region of La Carballeda – with the subregion La Requejada – and Aliste, with at least a part of its adjacent lands (Alba and Tábara). This area is characterized by a blur and progressive disappearance, greater as we move to the East, of the features still clearly seen in the previous area. The gradual and negative character of this characteristic explains how vague the limits are".

==== Number of speakers ====
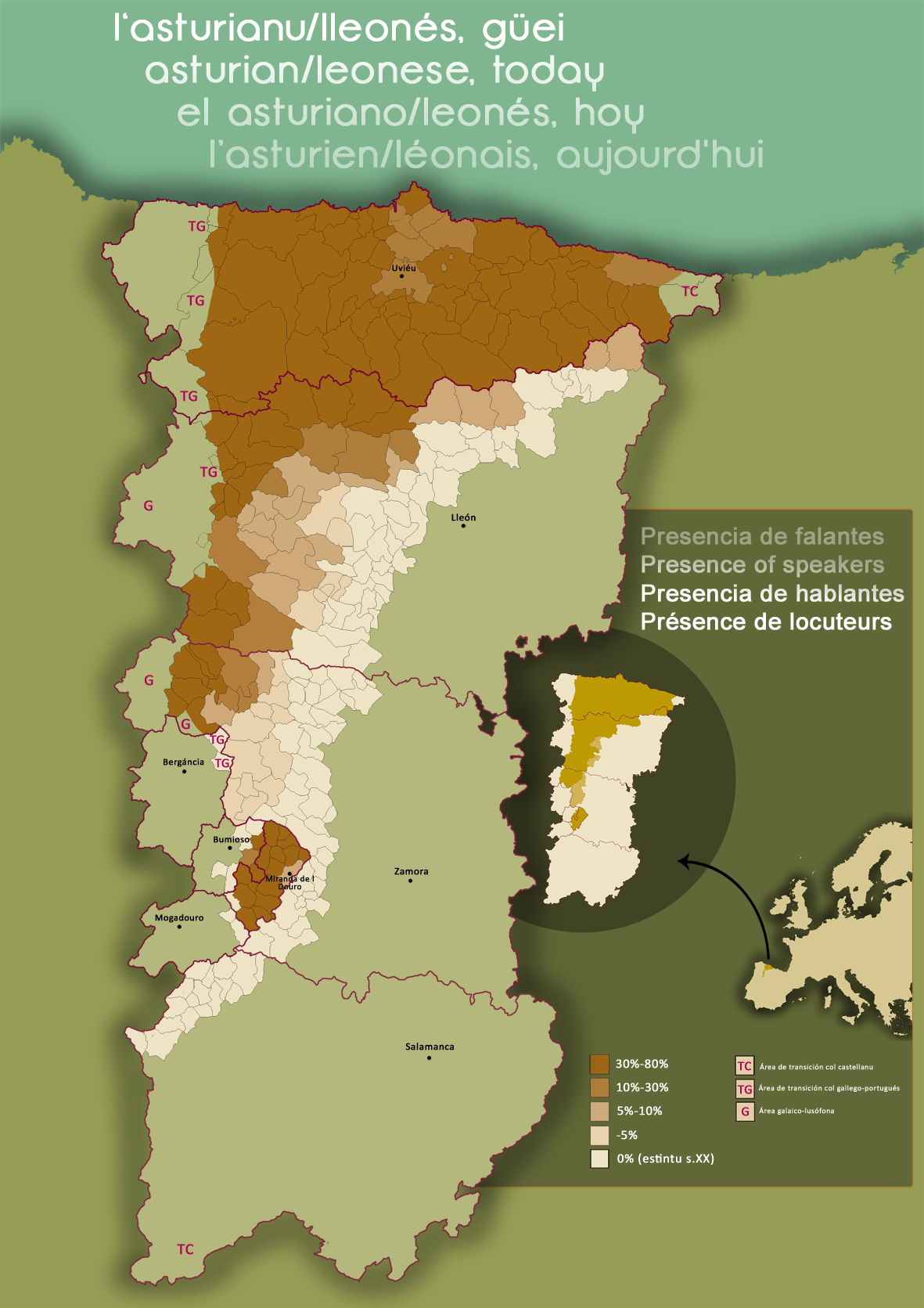
Percentage of Asturleonese speakers, according to Iniciativa pol Asturianu

A "speaker of Leonese" is defined here as a person who knows (and can speak) a variety of Leonese. There is no linguistic census of the number of Leonese speakers in the provinces of León and Zamora, and estimates vary from 5,000 to 50,000.

Number of speakers, according to studies
Sociolinguistic study	Number of speakers
II Estudiu sociollingüísticu de Lleón: Identidá, conciencia d'usu y actitúes llingüístiques de la población lleonesa	50,000
Facendera pola Llengua newsletter	25,000
El asturiano-leonés: aspectos lingüísticos, sociolingüísticos y legislación	20,000 to 25,000
Linguas en contacto na bisbarra do Bierzo: castelán, astur-leonés e galego.	2,500 to 4,000 (El Bierzo, Ribas de Sil, Fornela, and La Cabrera)

==== Studies ====
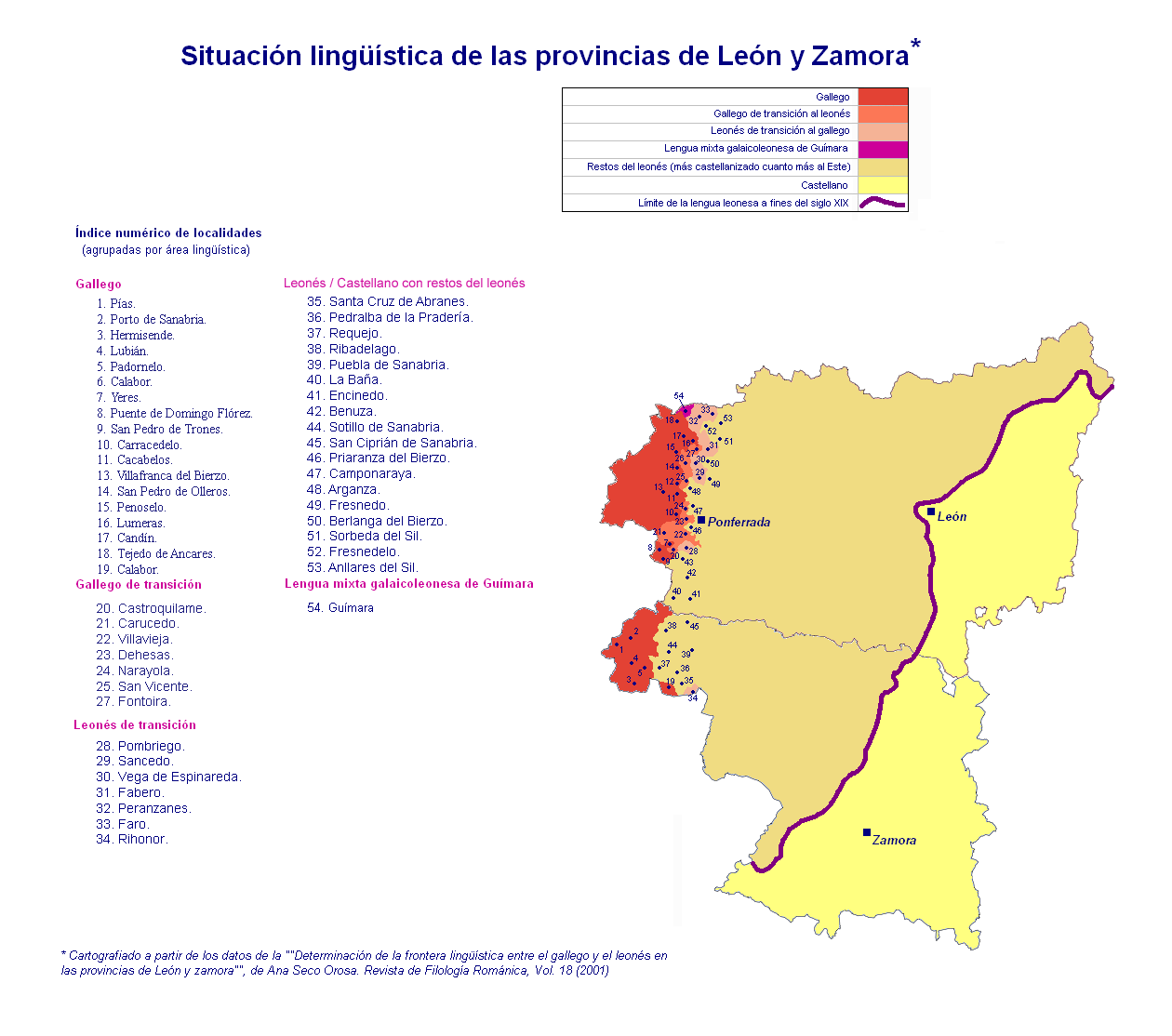
2009 linguistic map of Zamora and León

Two sociolinguistic studies, in northern Leon and the entire province analysed the prevalence of Leonese and the linguistic attitudes of its speakers. According to the latter, maintenance of the language is the primary wish but opinions differ about how to do so. Almost 37 per cent think that the language should be kept for nonofficial uses, and about 30 per cent believe it should be on a par with Spanish. Twenty-two per cent favour its disappearance. Nearly the population supports granting official status to Leonese by amending the Statute of Autonomy. About 70 per cent favour linguistic coordination between León and Asturias, with 20 per cent opposing. Leonese in education is favoured by more than 63 per cent of the population, and opposed by about 34 per cent. Institutional promotion of the dialect, especially by town councils, was favoured by more than 83 per cent of respondents.

==== Recognition ====
The Statute of Autonomy of Castile and León, amended 30 November 2007, addresses the status of Spanish, Leonese, and Galician. According to Section 5.2, "Leonese will be specifically protected by the institutions for its particular value within the linguistic patrimony of the Community. Its protection, usage and promotion will be regulated".

On 24 February 2010, a parliamentary group from the Spanish Socialist Workers' Party presented a proposition to the Cortes of Castile and León to recognize the value of Leonese and implement a plan to protect and promote it. Although the proposition was approved unanimously by the plenary session of the parliament of Castile and León on 26 May, the government's position has not changed.

==== Vitality ====
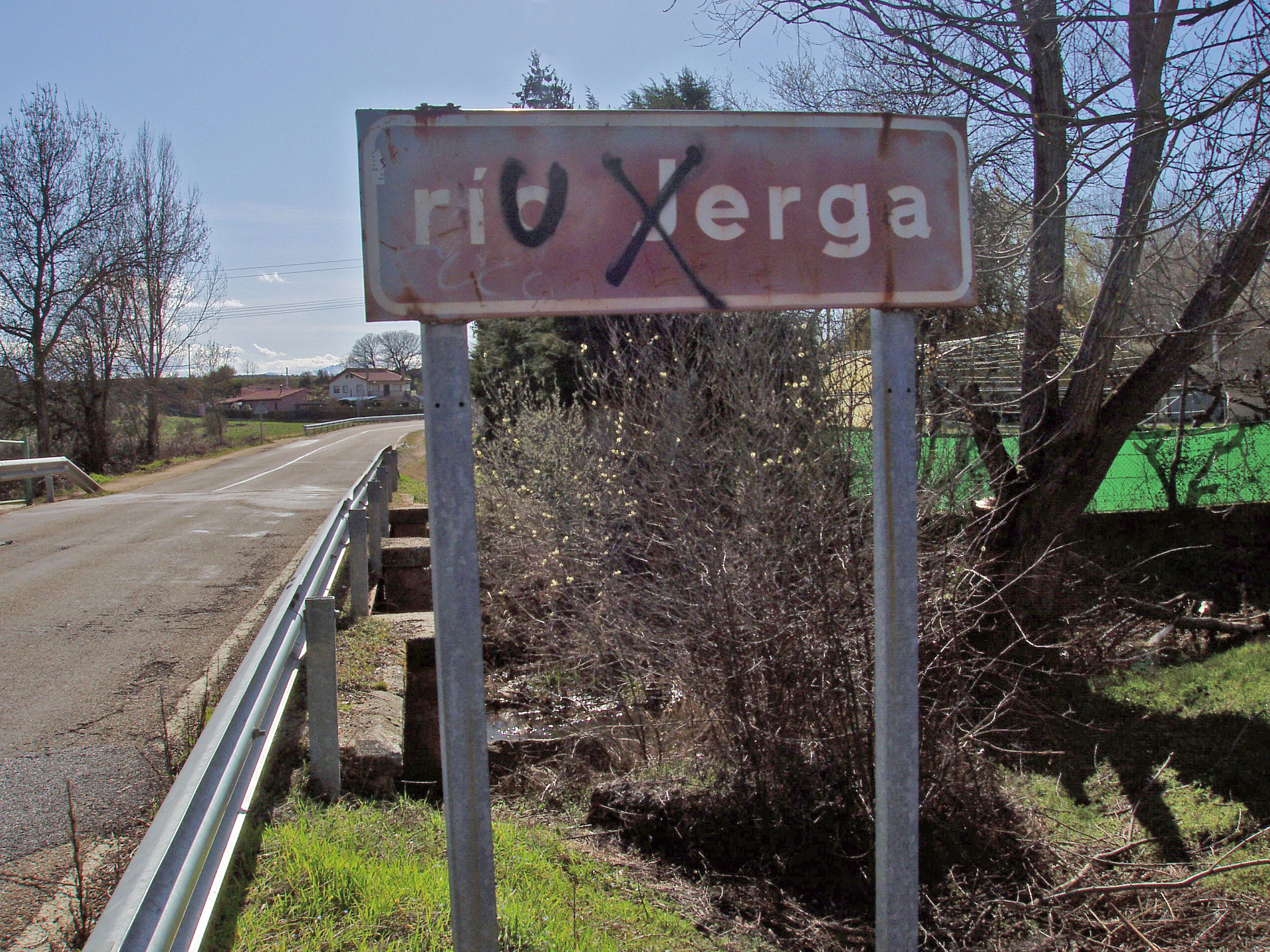
Ad hoc "translation" into Leonese

UNESCO, in its Atlas of the World's Languages in Danger, listed Leonese in the most at-risk category. The category's criteria are:

- unofficial
- without legitimized significant use in the news media
- low levels of proficiency and use
- poor social prestige
- not used as a medium of primary education
- not used in official toponyms

==== Standardization ====
The Autonomous Community of Castile and León lacks a government agency to promote minority languages and a nongovernmental agency in an advisory capacity in matters pertaining to minority languages. The Academy of the Asturian Language has sponsored linguistic and sociolinguistic research, which encompasses the non-Asturian dialects of Asturian-Leonese. Two congresses about Leonese have been held, at which the following measures were proposed to move towards language standardization:

- Based on articles 5.2 and 5.3 of the Statute of Autonomy, raise the legal status of Leonese to equal that of Galician.
- Create an autonomous administrative organ under the Department of Culture and Tourism responsible for protecting and promoting Leonese and Galician.
- Introduce Leonese into adult and childhood education.
- Recover native toponymy with bilingual signage.
- Support cultural and literary Leonese and its publications and collaborate with associations which base their work on the recovery of Leonese, encourage Leonese in social media, and promote literary contests in the dialect.
- Promote study of Leonese through the universities and centres of study and investigation such as the Institute of Studies in Zamora, the Cultural Institute in Leon, the Institute of Studies of El Bierzo and the Marcelo Macías Institute of Studies in Astorga.
- Coordinate and cooperate with linguistic institutions, study centres, and administrations in the rest of the Asturialeonese linguistic area.
- Require local governments to assume responsibility for the recovery of Leonese.

==== Promotion ====
For about 15 years cultural associations have offered Leonese-language courses, sometimes with the support of local administrations in the provinces of Leon and Zamora. In 2001, the Universidad de León (University of León) created a course for teachers of Leonese. The dialect can be studied in the larger villages of León, Zamora and Salamanca provinces as El Fueyu courses, following an agreement between the Leonese provincial government and the organization. The Leonese Language Teachers and Monitors Association (Asociación de Profesores y Monitores de Llingua Llïonesa) was created in 2008 to promote Leonese-language activities.

== Literature ==
Leonese literature includes:

- Benigno Suárez Ramos, El tío perruca, 1976. ISBN 978-84-400-1451-1.
- Cayetano Álvarez Bardón, Cuentos en dialecto leonés, 1981. ISBN 978-84-391-4102-0.
- Xuan Bello, Nel cuartu mariellu, 1982. ISBN 978-84-300-6521-9.
- Miguel Rojo, Telva ya los osos, 1994. ISBN 978-84-8053-040-8.
- Manuel García Menéndez, Corcuspin el Rozcayeiru, 1984. ISBN 978-84-600-3676-0.
- Manuel García Menéndez, Delina nel valle'l Faloupu, 1985. ISBN 978-84-600-4133-7.
- Eva González Fernández, Poesía completa : 1980–1991, 1991. ISBN 978-84-86936-58-7.
- Cuentos de Lleón: Antoloxía d'escritores lleoneses de güei, 1996. ISBN 84-87562-12-4.
- Roberto González-Quevedo, L.lume de l.luz, 2002. ISBN 978-84-8168-323-3.
- Roberto González-Quevedo, Pol sendeiru la nueite, 2002. ISBN 978-84-95640-37-6.
- Roberto González-Quevedo, Pan d'amore : antoloxía poética 1980–2003, 2004. ISBN 978-84-95640-95-6.
- Roberto González-Quevedo, El Sil que baxaba de la nieve, 2007. ISBN 978-84-96413-31-3.
- Emilce Núñez Álvarez, Atsegrías ya tristuras, 2005. ISBN 978-84-8177-093-3.
- Luis Cortés Vázquez, Leyendas, cuentos y romances de Sanabria, 2003. ISBN 978-84-95195-55-5.
- Ramón Menéndez Pidal, El dialecto leonés (Commemorative edition with stories and poems in Leonese), 2006. ISBN 978-84-933781-6-5.
- Cuentos populares leoneses (escritos por niños), 2006. ISBN 978-84-611-0795-7.
- Nicolás Bartolomé Pérez, Filandón: lliteratura popular llionesa, 2007. ISBN 978-84-933380-7-7.
- José Aragón y Escacena, Entre brumas, 1921. ISBN 978-84-8012-569-7.
- Francisco Javier Pozuelo Alegre, Poemas pa nun ser lleídos, 2008. ISBN 978-84-612-4484-3.
- Xosepe Vega Rodríguez, Epífora y outros rellatos, 2008. ISBN 978-84-612-5315-9.
- Xosepe Vega Rodríguez, Breve hestoria d'un gamusinu, 2008. ISBN 978-84-612-5316-6.
- Antoine De Saint-Exupéry, El Prencipicu (Translation of The Little Prince), 2009. ISBN 978-84-96872-03-5.
- Ramón Rei Rodríguez, El ñegru amor, 2009. ISBN 978-84-613-1824-7.
- Juan Andrés Oria de Rueda Salguero, Llogas carbayesas, 2009. ISBN 978-84-613-1822-3.

== See also ==
- Asturian language
- Mirandese language
- Spanish language
- Bercian dialect
- Asociación de Profesores y Monitores de Llingua Llïonesa
- Caitano Bardón
- Cuentos del Sil
- Eva González
- Omañese

== Sources ==
- García Gil, Héctor (2008). Asturian-leonese: Linguistic, Sociolinguistic and Legal Aspects (PDF). Working Papers. Vol. 25. Translated by Jenkins, Peter David. Barcelona, Spain: Mercator Legislation; CIEMEN. ISSN 2013-102X. Archived from the original (PDF) on 27 March 2014.
- González Riaño, Xosé Antón; García Arias, Xosé Lluis (2008). II Estudiu Sociollingüísticu De Lleón: Identidá, conciencia d'usu y actitúes llingüístiques de la población lleonesa. Estaya Sociollingüística (in Asturian). Vol. 4. Oviedo, Spain: Academia de la Llingua Asturiana. ISBN 978-84-8168-448-3.
- López Morales, Humberto (August 1965). "Elementos leoneses en la lengua del teatro pastoril de los siglos XV y XVI" (PDF). In Sánchez Romeralo, Jaime; Poulussen, Norbert (eds.). Actas del Segundo Congreso Internacional de Hispanistas. Congress of the International Association of Hispanists. Nijmegen, The Netherlands: Asociación Internacional de Hispanistas (published 1967). pp. 411–419.
- Morala Rodríguez, José Ramón (2009). El leonés en el siglo XXI: Un romance milenario ante el reto de su normalización. Beltenebros. Vol. 23. Burgos, Spain: Instituto Castellano y Leonés de la Lengua. ISBN 978-84-936383-8-2.
- Menéndez Pidal, Ramón (1906). "El dialecto leonés" (PDF). Revista de Archivos, Bibliotecas y Museos (in Spanish). No. 2–3. Cuerpo de Archiveros, Bibliotecarios y Arqueólogos. pp. 128–172, 294–311. ISSN 0034-771X.
- Pardo Fernández, Abel (2008). "El Llïonés y las TICs" (PDF). In Sánchez Prieto, Raúl; Veith, Daniel; Martínez Areta, Mikel (eds.). Mikroglottika Yearbook 2008 (in Spanish). Vol. 1. Peter Lang. pp. 55–65. ISBN 978-3-631-58027-1. Archived from the original on 20 September 2009.
- Staaff, Erik (1907). Étude sur l'ancien dialecte léonais d'après les chartes du XIIIe siècle. Uppsala, Sweden.
