= River Cúa =

River in the province of León, Spain

Coordinates: 42°31′44″N 6°46′56″W

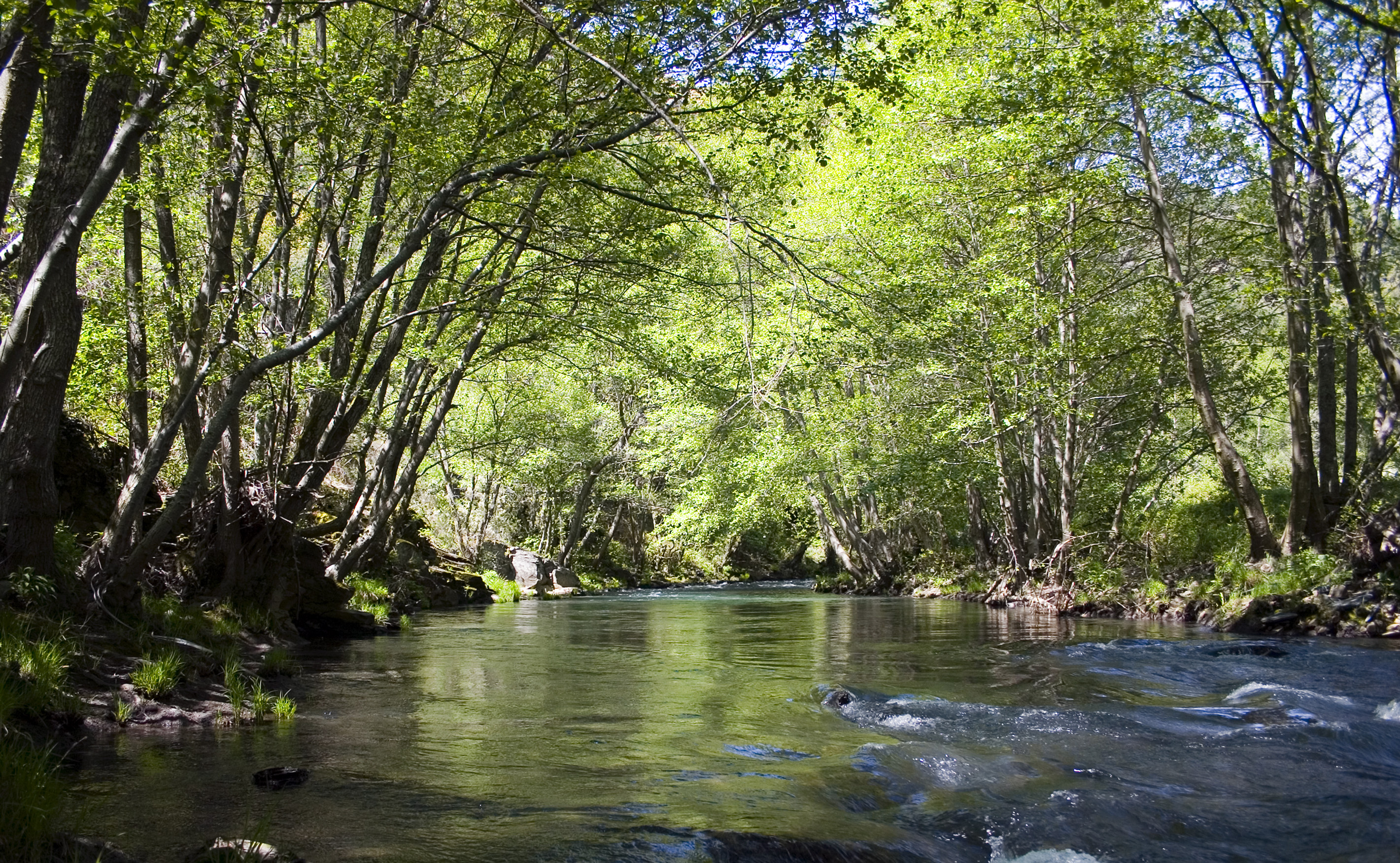
River Cùa between the towns of Vega de Espinareda and San Vicente in Spain.

The river Cúa is situated in the north of the region of El Bierzo in the province of León, autonomous community of Castilla y León (Spain). It rises in the Campo de la Pesca, near the port of Cienfuegos and flows into the river Sil at Toral de los Vados. The tributaries of some importance on the right are the Ancares and Burbia rivers and of lesser volume on the left: the aforementioned Arroyo de Trayecto, the Faro river and the Biarzas river.

At first it runs in a W-E direction until one kilometre after receiving the waters of the Trayecto stream on the left, where the direction changes to N-S. It crosses the municipalities of Peranzanes, Fabero, Vega de Espinareda, Arganza, Cacabelos, Carracedelo and Villadecanes-Toral de los Vados.

It belongs to the Miño-Sil Hydrographic Confederation.

== Bridges ==
The bridge over the River Cúa on the outskirts of Cacabelos was the scene of the Battle of Cacabelos, an armed confrontation of the Spanish War of Independence that took place in January 1809 during the retreat to La Coruña of British troops under the command of Sir John Moore.

As it passes through the municipality of Vega de Espinareda there are several bridges that cross the river Cúa, one of them being a Roman bridge from the 1st or 2nd century AD. This bridge has been restored because the river carried part of it away in a flood.
