= List of municipalities of El Bierzo =

This is a list of the municipalities in the region of El Bierzo in the province of León, autonomous community of Castile and León, Spain.

Name	Pop. (2002)
Arganza	878
Balboa	440
Barjas	370
Bembibre	10,486
Benuza	787
Berlanga del Bierzo	416
Borrenes	484
Cabañas Raras	1,293
Cacabelos	4,816
Camponaraya	3,256
Candín	423
Carracedelo	3,560
Carucedo	660
Castropodame	1,866
Congosto	1,753
Corullón	1,190
Cubillos del Sil	1,563
Fabero	5,632
Folgoso de la Ribera	1,297
Igüeña	1,851
Molinaseca	769
Noceda del Bierzo	873
Oencia	468
Palacios del Sil	1,440
Páramo del Sil	1,698
Peranzanes	334
Ponferrada	64,010
Priaranza del Bierzo	926
Puente de Domingo Flórez	1,943
Sancedo	567
Toral de los Vados	2,247
Sobrado	499
Toreno	4,053
Torre del Bierzo	3,011
Trabadelo	520
Vega de Espinareda	2,834
Vega de Valcarce	850
Villafranca del Bierzo	3,682

== See also ==
- Geography of Spain
- List of cities in Spain
