= Cabreira =

Cabreira La Cabrera
- Comarca
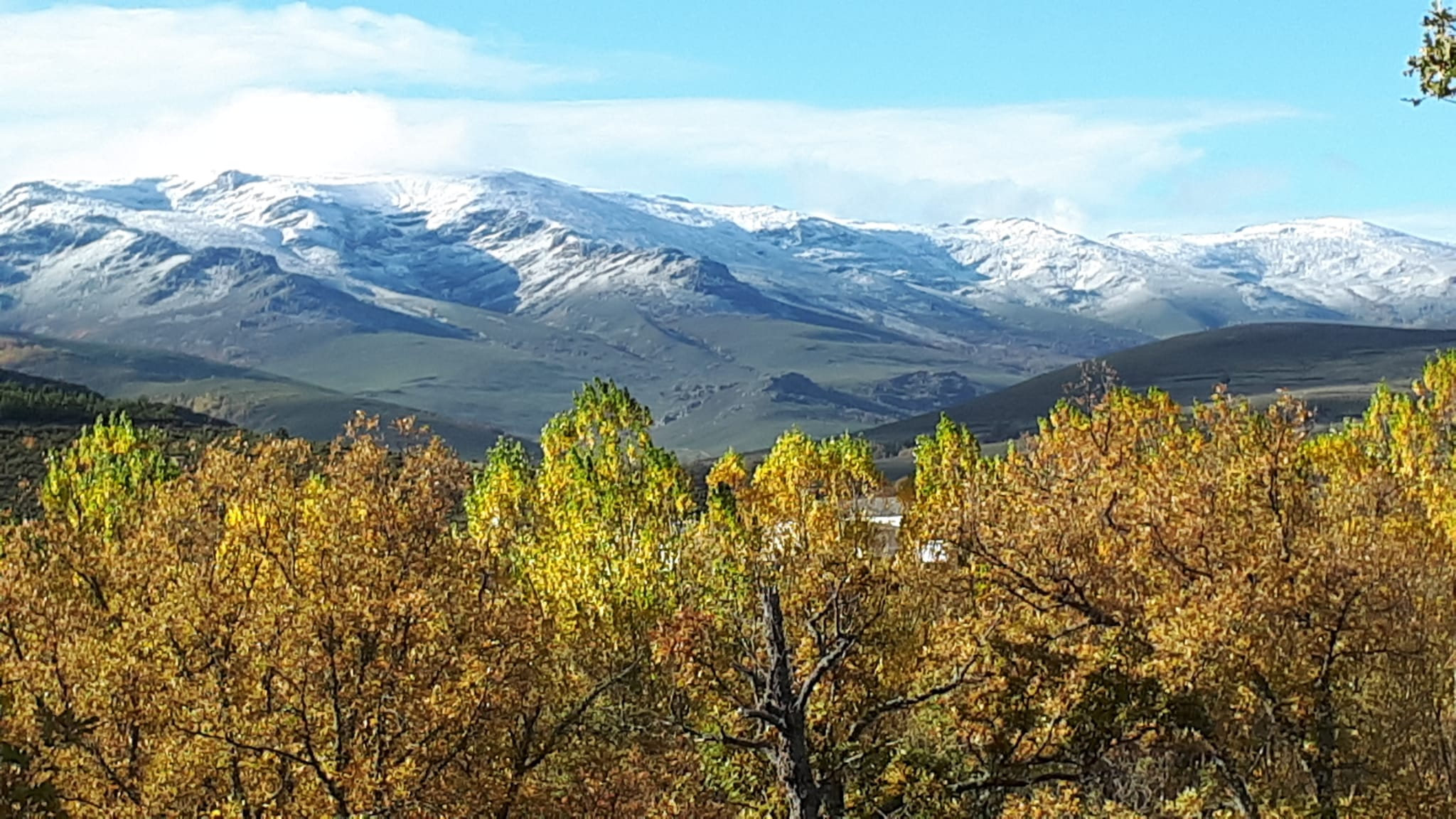

- Location of La Cabrera in the province of Leon
- Coordinates: 42.340278°N 6.544167°W
- Country: Spain
- Province: León
- Subdivisions: Municipalities: 5

Area
  - Total: 846 km^{2} (327 sq mi)

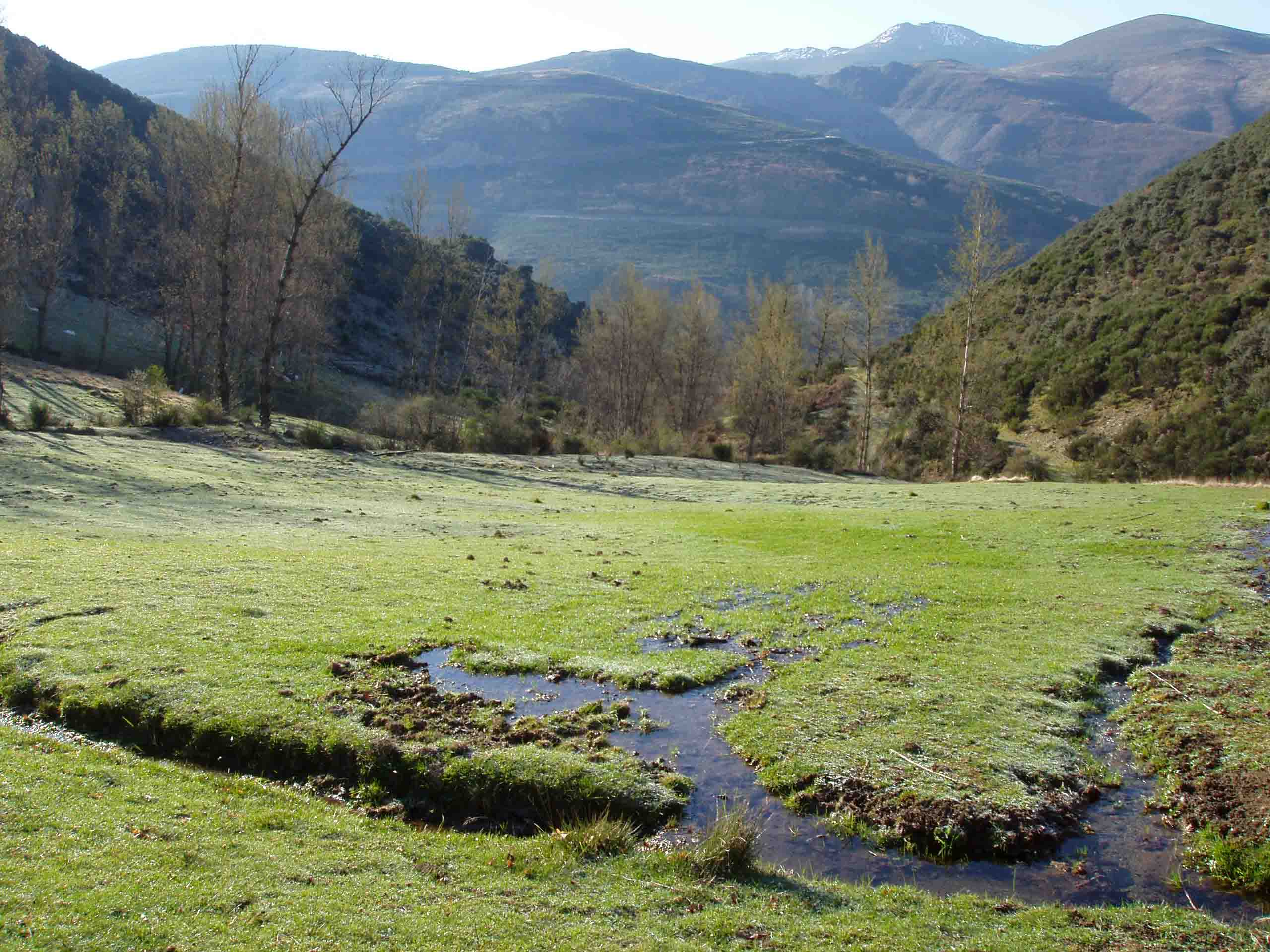
Valdouteiru valley near Quintanilla de Losada.

La Cabrera (Cabreira in Leonese language) is a comarca (shire) in the province of León, Spain. Its surface is 115.87 km^{2} and the population was 3,375 inhabitants in 2016. The Sierra de la Cabrera range dominates the landscape of this mountainous comarca.

== Municipalities ==
- Benuza (Benuza)
- Castriellu de Cabreira (Castrillo de Cabrera)
- Encinéu (Encinedo)
- A Ponte de Domingos Flórez (Puente de Domingo Flórez)
- Trueitas (Truchas)

== Language ==
Leonese language is widely spoken throughout the entire shire by a large, well established and historically rooted community of local native speakers across the whole region.

== See also ==
- León Province
- Leonese language
