= Manuel Orallo =

Manuel Orallo (1919 – 2003) was mayor of Fabero, León, in north-west Spain, from 1967 until 1977 and a provincial deputy of Léon during the 1960s and 1970s. He was declared Adopted Son of Fabero in December 2005 and a street was named after him.

He was born in Toreno in 1919 and raised there as well. He read pharmacy at the University of Santiago de Compostela before moving to Fabero in 1952 to work as a pharmacist.

His achievements as mayor of Fabero include the institution of several education centres (the La Cortina and Manuel Fernández centres for basic and primary education, plus a high school), as well as the construction of a new church, a multi-sports centre and a municipal football pitch. During his time in office the main road to the Fornela Valley was constructed.

He died in his 84th year.
