= Truchas =

Truchas, Spanish for "trout" (plural), may refer to:

- Truchas, León
- Truchas, New Mexico
- Truchas Peak, peak in New Mexico
