= Sancedo =

Coordinates: 42°40′0″N 6°38′7.1″W

Sancedo, Spain
- municipality
- Flag Coat of arms
- Interactive map of Sancedo, Spain
- Country: Spain
- Autonomous community: Castile and León
- Province: León
- Region: El Bierzo
- Municipality: Sancedo

Area
  - Total: 31 km^{2} (12 sq mi)
- Elevation: 673 m (2,208 ft)

Population (2025-01-01)
  - Total: 532
  - Density: 17/km^{2} (44/sq mi)
- Time zone: UTC+1 (CET)
  - Summer (DST): UTC+2 (CEST)
- Climate: Csb

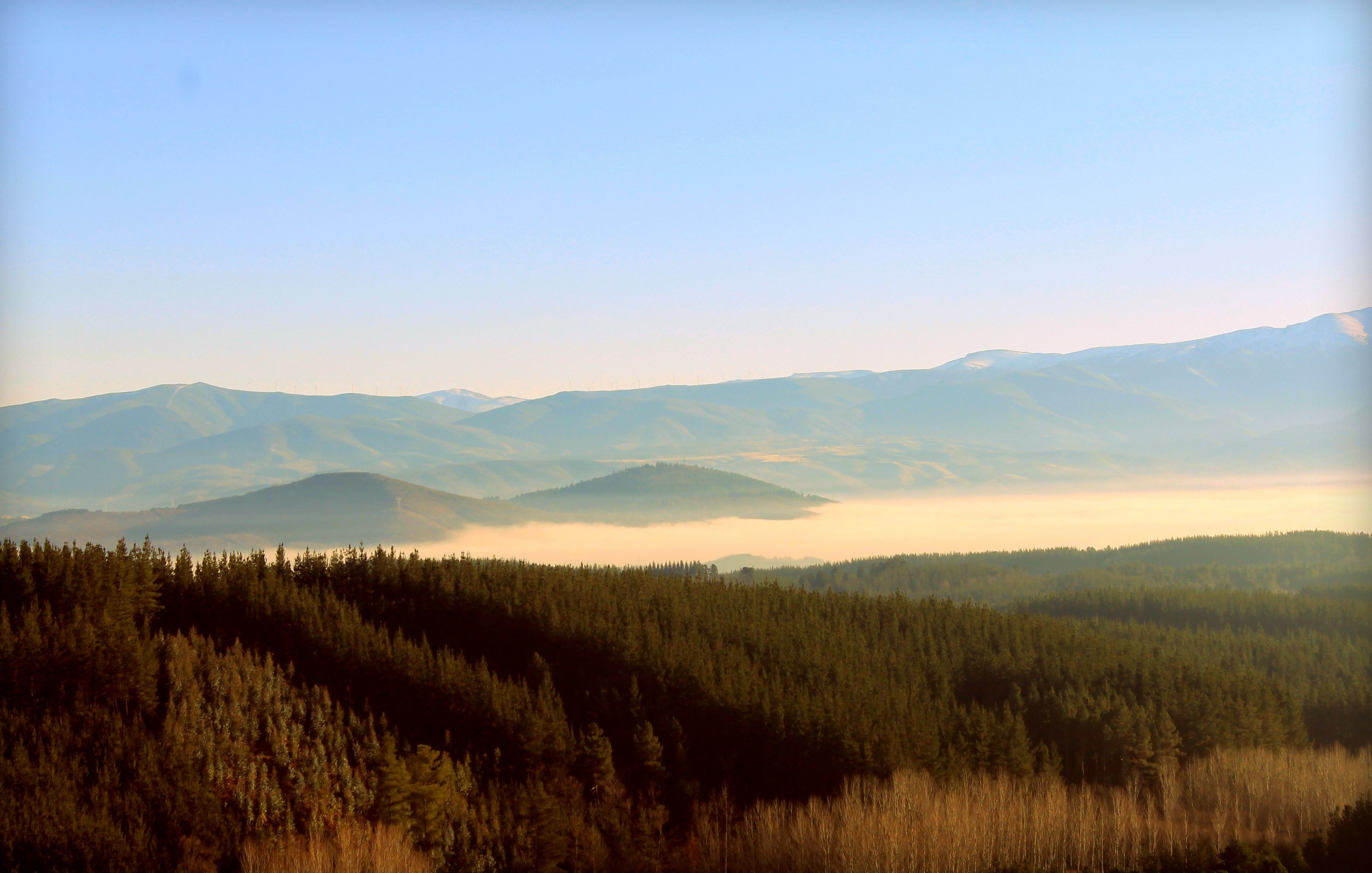
view from Sancedo

Sancedo (Sancéu in Leonese language) is a village and municipality located in the region of El Bierzo (province of León, Castile and León, Spain) . According to the 2025 census (INE), the municipality had a population of 532 inhabitants.
