= Berlanga del Bierzo =

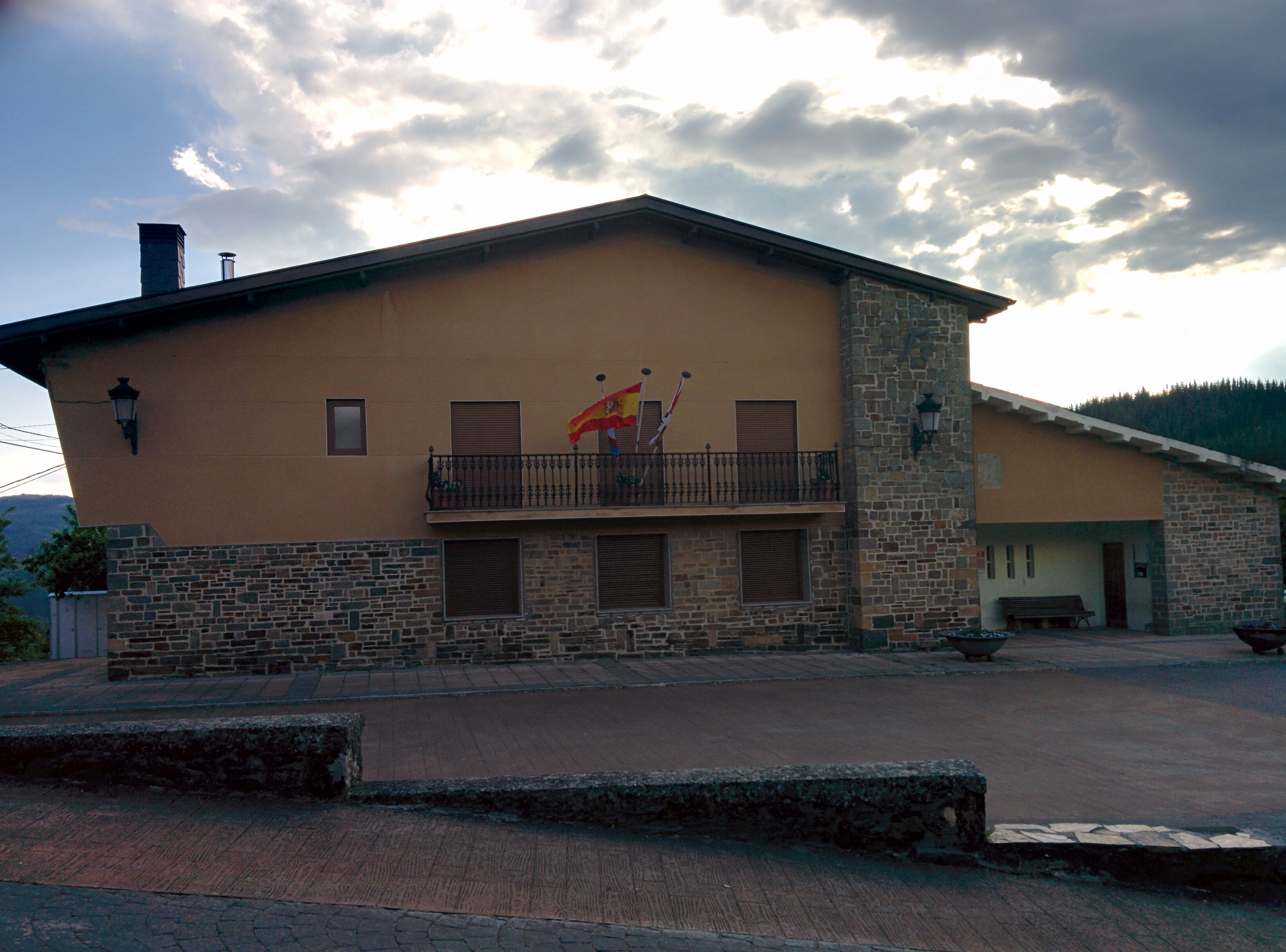
- Town hall

- Coat of arms

- Location within Spain
- Coordinates: 42°43′52″N 6°36′15″W
- Country: Spain
- Autonomous community: Castile and León
- Province: León
- Comarca: El Bierzo
- Municipality: Berlanga del Bierzo

Government
  - Mayor: César Álvarez Rodríguez (PSOE)

Area
  - Total: 27.89 km^{2} (10.77 sq mi)
- Elevation: 809 m (2,654 ft)

Population (2025-01-01)
  - Total: 311
  - Density: 11.2/km^{2} (28.9/sq mi)
- Time zone: UTC+1 (CET)
  - Summer (DST): UTC+2 (CEST)
- Postal Code: 24438
- Telephone prefix: 987
- Climate: Csb
- Website: Berlanga del Bierzo

Berlanga del Bierzo (Spanish pronunciation: [beɾˈlaŋɡa ðel ˈβjeɾθo]) is a village and municipality located in the region of El Bierzo (province of León, Castile and León, Spain). According to the 2010 census (INE), the municipality has a population of 389 inhabitants.
