= Trabadelo =

Coordinates: 42°38′58″N 6°52′55″W

Trabadelo, Spain
- municipality
- Coat of arms
- Interactive map of Trabadelo, Spain
- Country: Spain
- Autonomous community: Castile and León
- Province: León
- Region: El Bierzo
- Municipality: Trabadelo

Area
  - Total: 64.73 km^{2} (24.99 sq mi)

Population (2025-01-01)
  - Total: 321
  - Density: 4.96/km^{2} (12.8/sq mi)
- Time zone: UTC+1 (CET)
  - Summer (DST): UTC+2 (CEST)
- Climate: Csb

Trabadelo (Trabadiellu, in Leonese language) is a village and municipality located in the region of El Bierzo (province of León, Castile and León, Spain). According to the 2025 census (INE), the municipality had a population of 321.

== History ==
In 1821 Trabadelo became part of the province of Villafranca. When that province lost its status, the 1833 territorial division assigned Trabadelo to the province of León, within a demarcation known as the Kingdom of León (Reinu de Llión in Leonese), distinct from the medieval kingdom, which is still in effect today.

== See also ==
- El Bierzo
