= Barjas =

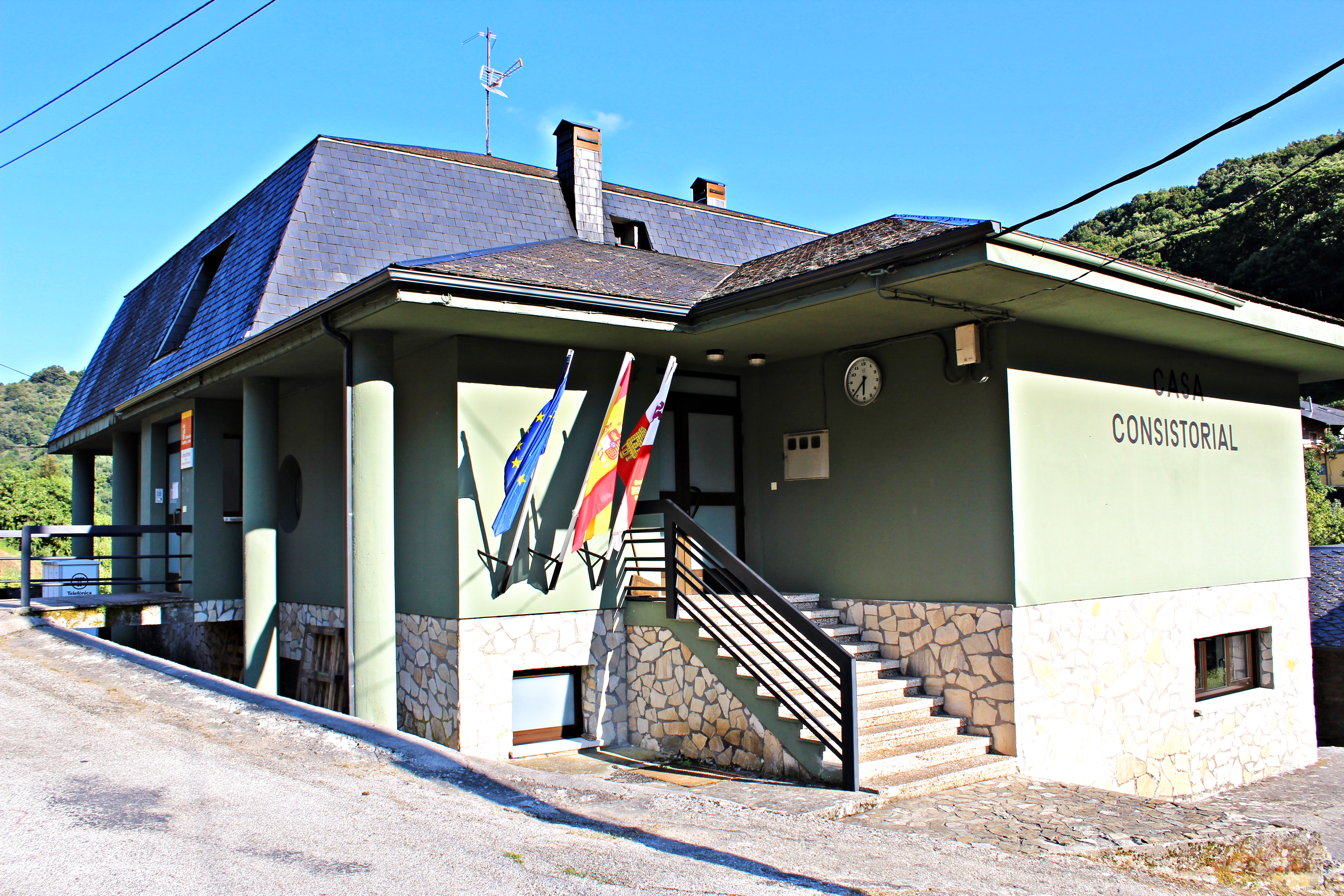
- Town hall

- Flag Coat of arms

- Location within Spain
- Coordinates: 42°36′40″N 6°58′43″W
- Country: Spain
- Autonomous community: Castile and León
- Province: León
- Comarca: El Bierzo
- Municipality: Barjas

Government
  - Mayor: Alfredo de Arriba López (PSOE)

Area
  - Total: 62.66 km^{2} (24.19 sq mi)
- Elevation: 837 m (2,746 ft)

Population (2025-01-01)
  - Total: 140
  - Density: 2.2/km^{2} (5.8/sq mi)
- Time zone: UTC+1 (CET)
  - Summer (DST): UTC+2 (CEST)
- Postal Code: 24521
- Telephone prefix: 987
- Climate: Csb

Barjas (Spanish pronunciation: [ˈbaɾxas]) (Barceniellas in Leonese language) is a village and municipality located in the region of El Bierzo (province of León, Castile and León, Spain). According to the 2010 census (INE), the municipality has a population of 261 inhabitants.
