= Encinedo =

Encinedo, Spain Encinéu
- Flag Coat of arms

- Location within Spain
- Coordinates: 42°16′15″N 6°35′39″W
- Country: Spain
- Autonomous community: Castile and León
- Province: León
- Municipality: Encinedo

Government
  - Mayor: José Manuel Moro Carrera (PP)

Area
  - Total: 195.01 km^{2} (75.29 sq mi)
- Elevation: 997 m (3,271 ft)

Population (2025-01-01)
  - Total: 621
  - Density: 3.18/km^{2} (8.25/sq mi)
- Demonym(s): cabreirense; cabreirés, cabreiresa
- Time zone: UTC+1 (CET)
  - Summer (DST): UTC+2 (CEST)
- Postal Code: 24745
- Telephone prefix: 987
- Website: Ayto. de Encinedo

Encinedo (Spanish pronunciation: [enθiˈneðo]), Encinéu in Leonese language, is a municipality located in the province of León, Cabreira shire, Spain. According to the 2010 census (INE), the municipality has a population of 870 inhabitants.

== Language ==
Leonese language is widely spoken in this municipality.

== See also ==
- Leonese language
- Cabreira
- Kingdom of León
