= Oencia =

Coordinates: 42°33′N 6°58′W

- municipality
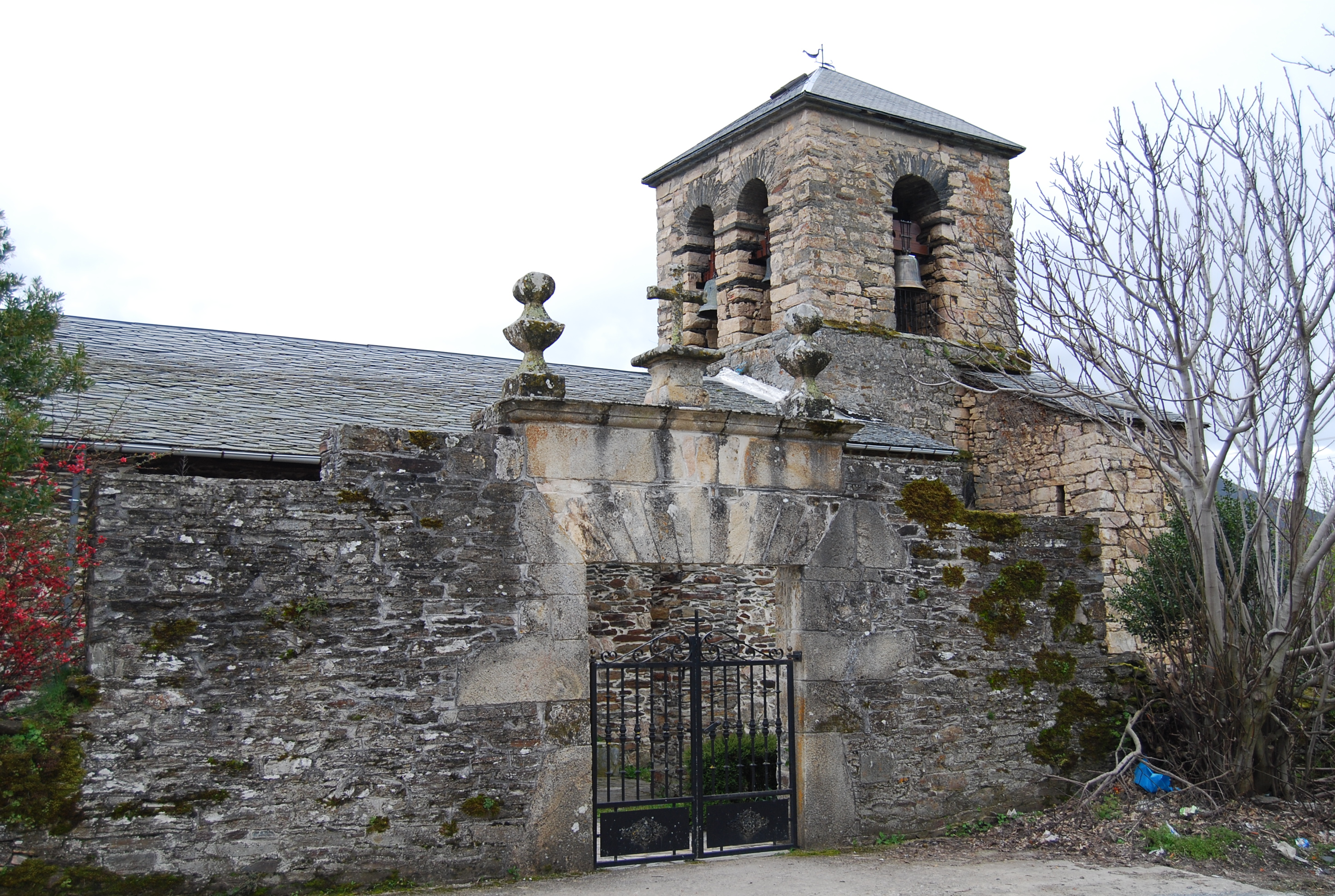
- Oencia Church
- Interactive map of Oencia
- Country: Spain
- Autonomous community: Castile and León
- Province: León
- Region: El Bierzo
- Municipality: Oencia

Area
  - Total: 98 km^{2} (38 sq mi)

Population (2025-01-01)
  - Total: 267
  - Density: 2.7/km^{2} (7.1/sq mi)
- Time zone: UTC+1 (CET)
  - Summer (DST): UTC+2 (CEST)
- Climate: Csb

Oencia is a village and municipality located in the region of El Bierzo (province of León, Castile and León, Spain). According to the 2025 census (INE), the municipality has a population of 267 inhabitants.

== Natural environment ==
The Selmo River is characterized by a high-velocity flow, which historically supported the operation of several ironworks along its course. Situated between Peña se Seo and the Serra da Enciña da Lastra mountain range, the surrounding mountainous region features forests of birch, beech, oak, and chestnut. Recorded fauna in the area includes species such as wolf, red fox, Eurasian otter, European badger, and roe deer.

== History ==
The founding of Oencia and the rest of the localities in the municipality dates back to the Middle Ages, when they were incorporated into the Kingdom of León, within which their foundation or repopulation would have taken place. Thus, during the 11th and 12th centuries, the localities of the municipality formed part of the tenencia of Aguiar.

By the 13th century, it is worth noting that in 1206 King Alfonso IX of León granted a specific charter (fuero) to the Tierra de Friera, and in 1228 he also issued a carta de behetría to the inhabitants of the Tierra de Aguiar.

Later, in the 14th century, most of Aguiar and the Tierra de Friera came under the control of the Rodríguez de Valcarce family, a lineage that at that time ended up bringing virtually the entire western third of El Bierzo under its authority.

Subsequently, in the 15th century, following the marriage between Pedro Álvarez Osorio, lord of Cabrera and Ribera de León, and Constanza de Valcarce, daughter of García Rodríguez de Valcarce y Balboa, these lands passed into the hands of the Osorio family, who in 1456 received the County of Lemos from King Henry IV. However, upon his death in 1483, a succession conflict broke out, which the Catholic Monarchs resolved in 1486 with the creation of the Marquisate of Villafranca, thereby placing Oencia under the authority of the Marquisate of Villafranca. During this period, with the reduction in the number of cities entitled to vote in the Cortes following the Cortes of 1425, the localities of the municipality also came to be represented by León, which led them to form part of the province of León in the Early Modern period, within which they were located in the district of Ponferrada.

On the other hand, due to the territorial attachment of Oencia to the Kingdom of León since the Early Middle Ages, throughout the entire Early Modern period the localities of the municipality formed part of the jurisdiction of the “Adelantamiento of the Kingdom of León.”

Finally, in the Contemporary period, in 1821 Oencia and the rest of the municipality’s localities became part of the province of Villafranca; however, when this province lost its provincial status at the end of the Liberal Triennium, the 1833 division reassigned them to the province of León, within a territorial demarcation known as the Kingdom of León (known in Leonese language as Reinu de Llión), distinct from the historical medieval kingdom, a designation that has remained in use and retains its validity to the present day. One year later, in 1834, when Spain carried out its first division into judicial districts, the municipality of Oencia was placed within the judicial district of Villafranca del Bierzo, although after this district was abolished in 1966, it came under the jurisdiction of the judicial district of Ponferrada.

In the mid-20th century, during the World War II, the municipality experienced its own particular gold rush with wolfram (tungsten), a mineral especially sought after at that time due to its suitability for the manufacture of heavy military weaponry.
