= Folgoso de la Ribera =

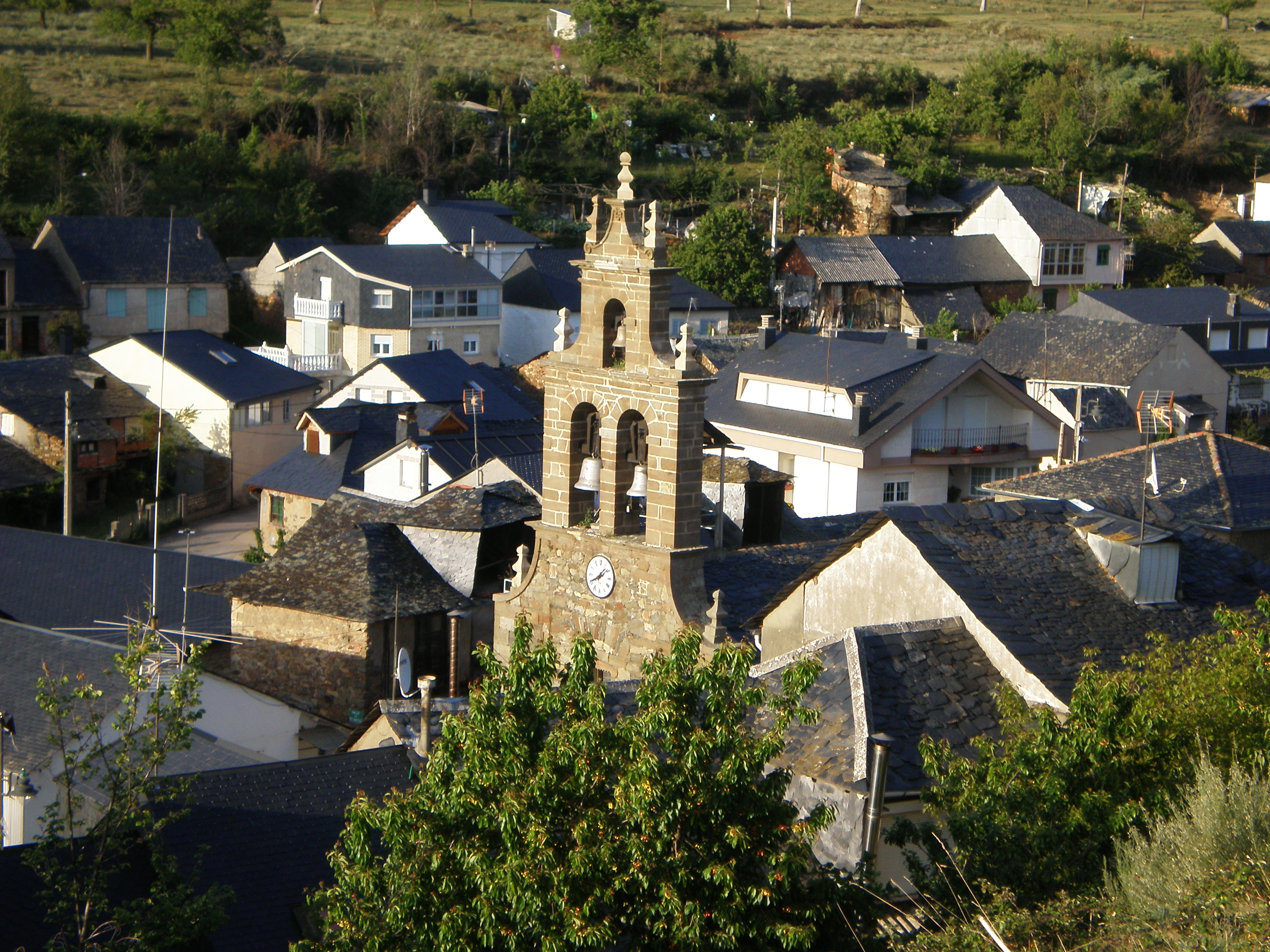

- Flag Coat of arms

- Location within Spain
- Coordinates: 42°38′36″N 6°19′9″W
- Country: Spain
- Autonomous community: Castile and León
- Province: León
- Comarca: El Bierzo
- Municipality: Folgoso de la Ribera

Government
  - Mayor: José Manuel Otero Merayo (PP)

Area
  - Total: 69.26 km^{2} (26.74 sq mi)
- Elevation: 768 m (2,520 ft)

Population (2025-01-01)
  - Total: 973
  - Density: 14.0/km^{2} (36.4/sq mi)
- Time zone: UTC+1 (CET)
  - Summer (DST): UTC+2 (CEST)
- Postal Code: 24311
- Telephone prefix: 987
- Climate: Csb
- Website: Ayto. de Folgoso de la Ribera

Folgoso de la Ribera (Spanish pronunciation: [folˈɣoso ðe la riˈβeɾa]) is a village and municipality located in the region of El Bierzo (province of León, Castile and León, Spain) . According to the 2010 census (INE), the municipality has a population of 1,233 inhabitants.

LINKS:

MOST COMPLETE WEB

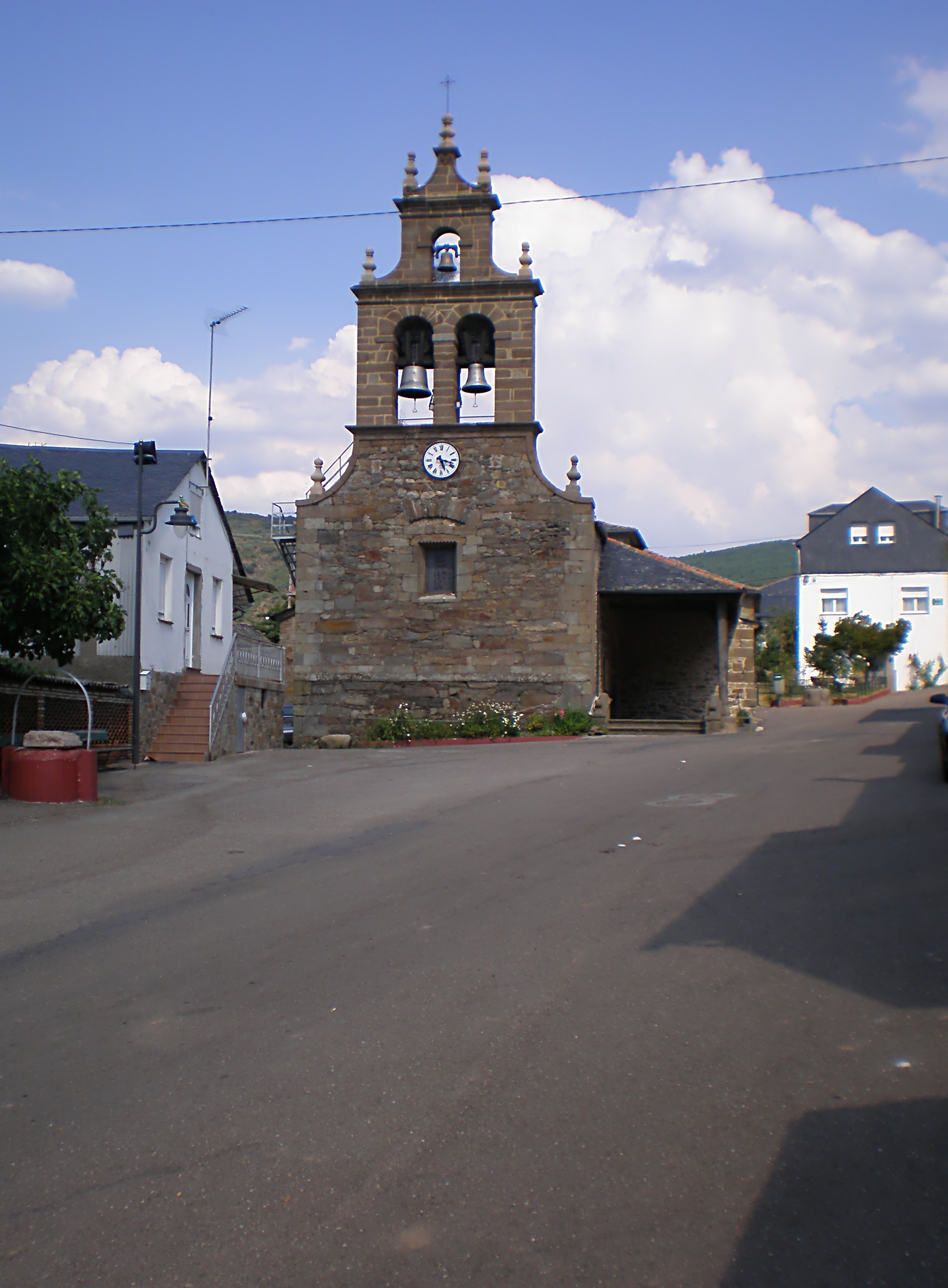
Church in Folgoso de la Ribera.

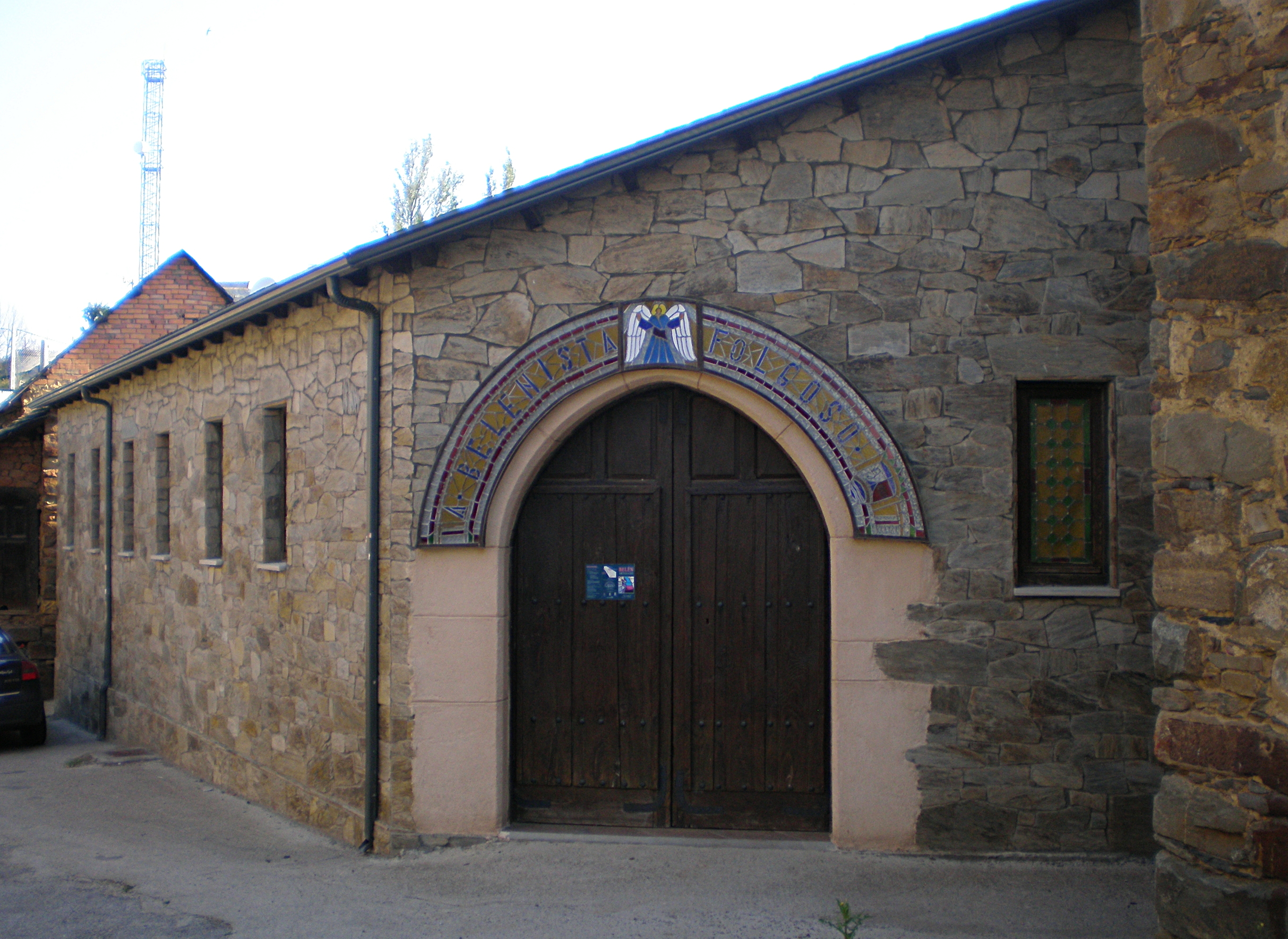
Asociación Belenista de Folgoso de la Ribera.

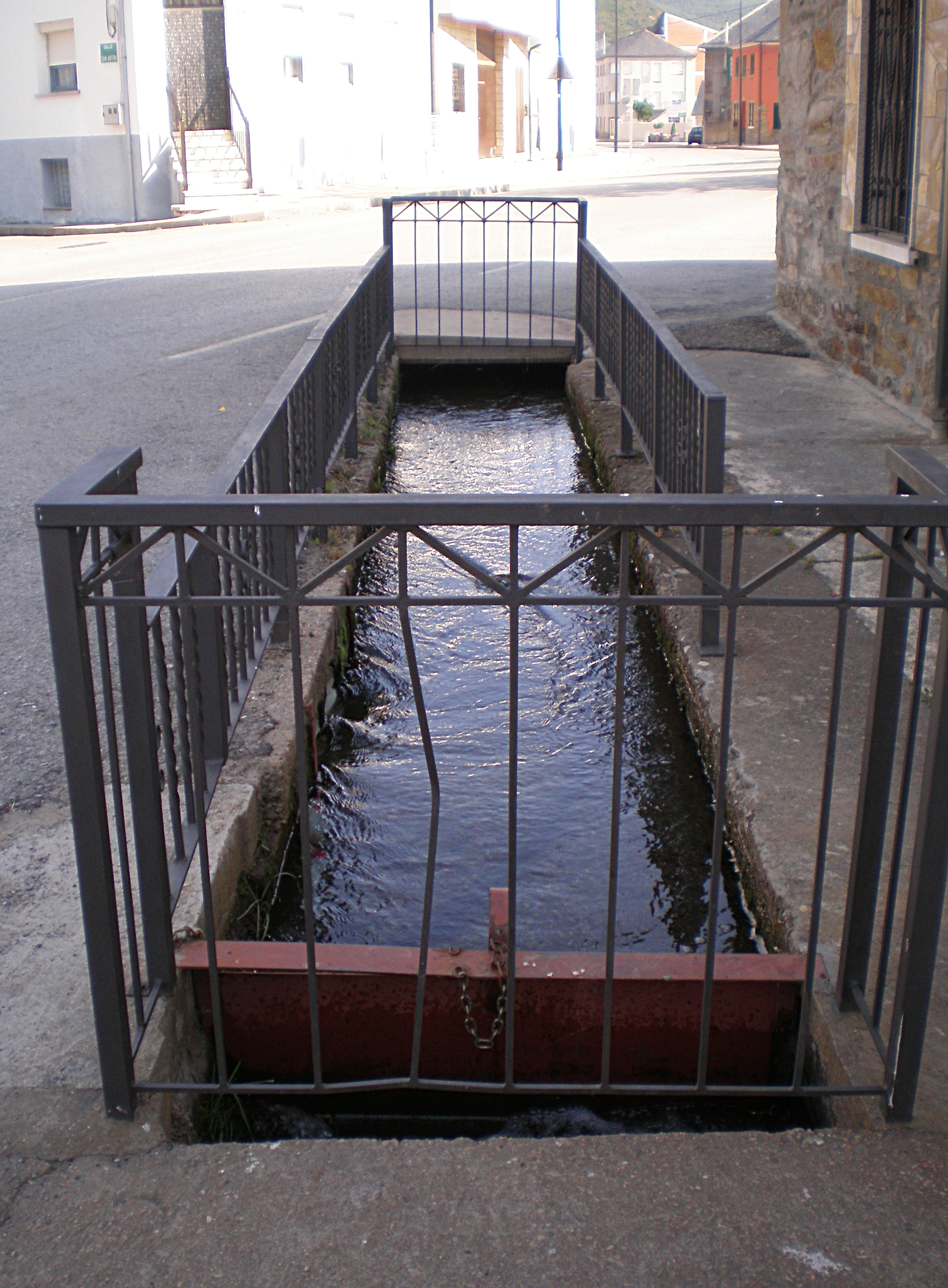

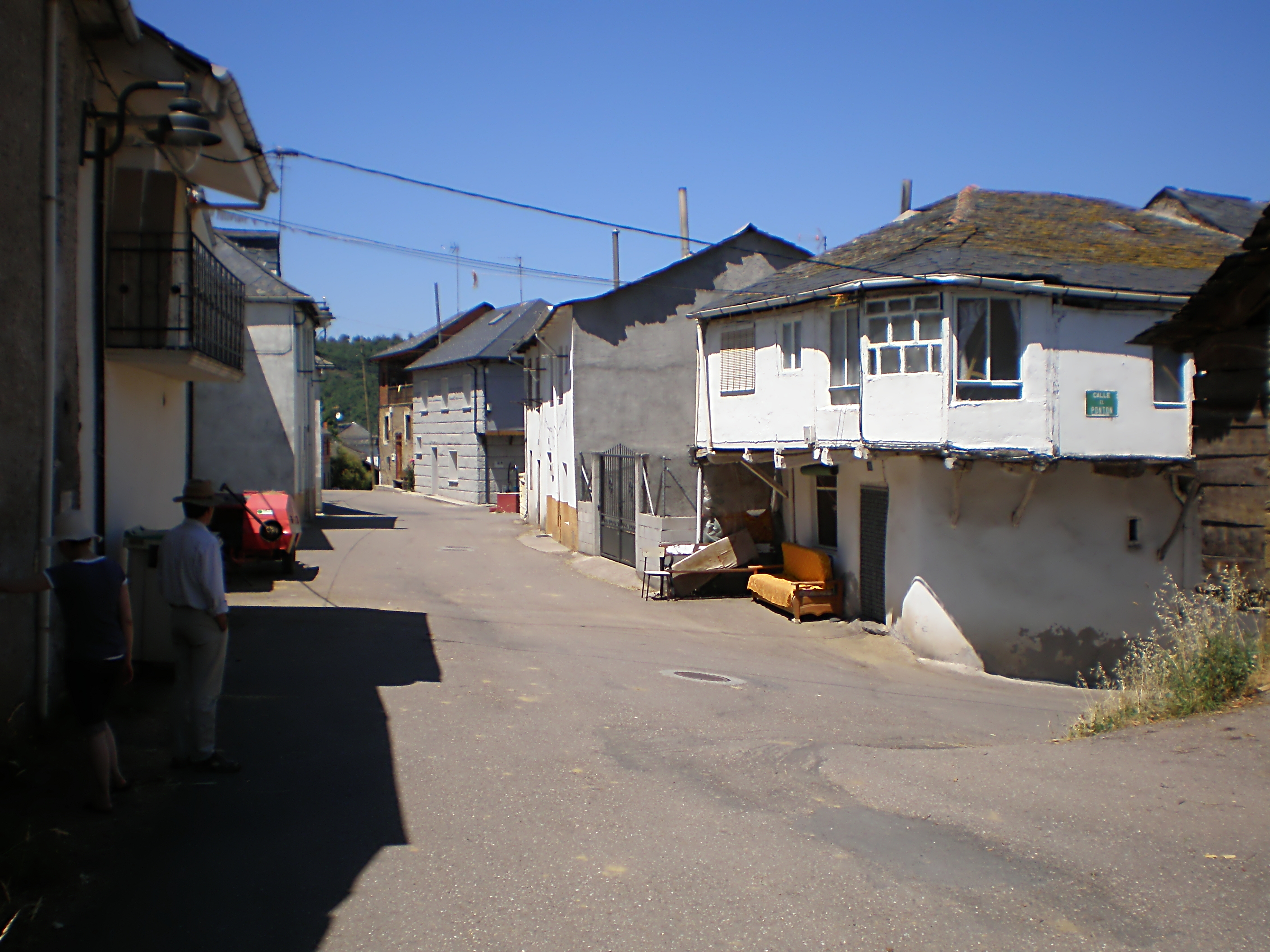

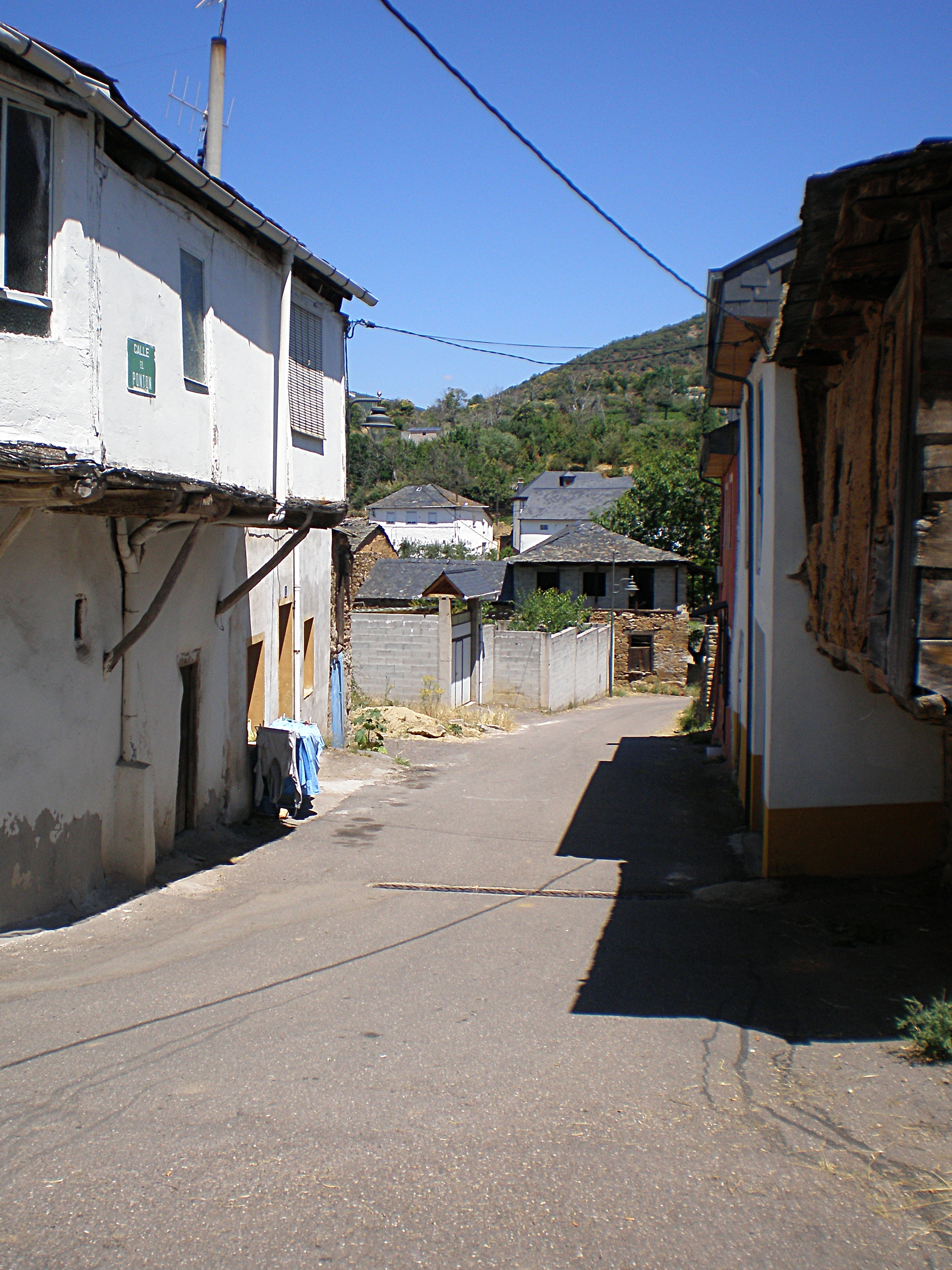
