= Borrenes =

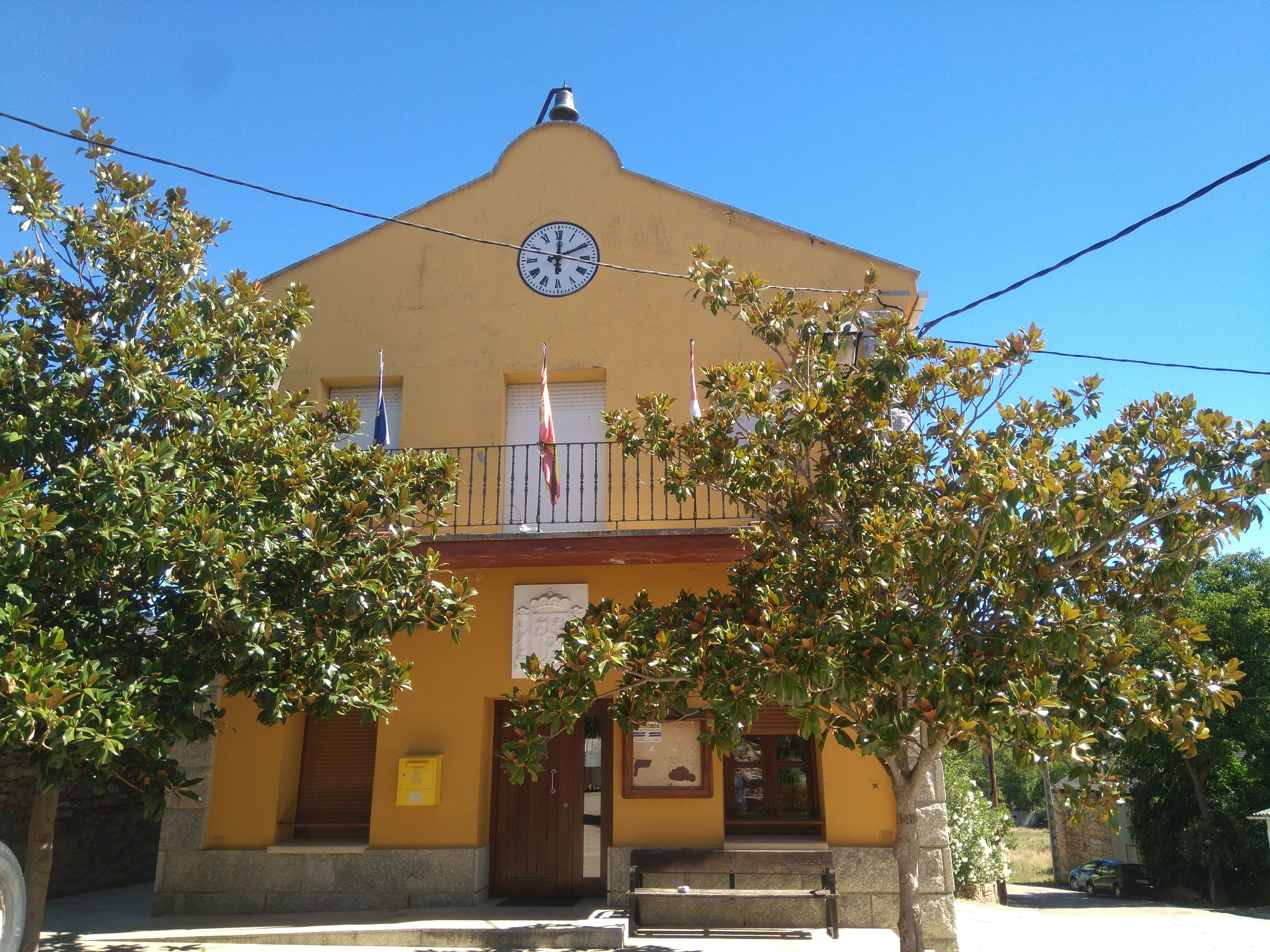
- Town hall

- Coat of arms

- Location within Spain
- Coordinates: 42°29′29″N 6°43′34″W
- Country: Spain
- Autonomous community: Castile and León
- Province: León
- Comarca: El Bierzo
- Municipality: Borrenes

Government
  - Mayor: Eduardo Prada Blanco (PP)

Area
  - Total: 36.38 km^{2} (14.05 sq mi)
- Elevation: 554 m (1,818 ft)

Population (2025-01-01)
  - Total: 297
  - Density: 8.16/km^{2} (21.1/sq mi)
- Demonym(s): borrenés, borrenesa
- Time zone: UTC+1 (CET)
  - Summer (DST): UTC+2 (CEST)
- Postal Code: 24443
- Telephone prefix: 987
- Climate: Csb

Borrenes (Spanish pronunciation: [boˈrenes]; is a village and municipality located in the region of El Bierzo (province of León, Castile and León, Spain). According to the 2010 census (INE), the municipality has a population of 402 inhabitants.

The council's linguistic identity is defined by its Leonese roots, which form the primary vernacular substrate of the area. This is recognized by the Statute of Autonomy of Castile and León, which mandates the protection and promotion of the Leonese language of the area
