= Tombrio de Abajo =

Area of Toreno in León, Spain

Coordinates: 42°42′35″N 6°33′08″W

Tombrio de Abajo is a locality in the municipality of Toreno, situated in El Bierzo, in the province of León, (Spain).

== Location ==
It is located in the west of the municipality, on the LE-716 road, from Vega de Espinareda to Toreno.

== Population ==
According to the INE, in 2014 there were 210 inhabitants, 104 men and 106 women.

== History ==
Tombrio de Abajo has historically been linked to the town of Toreno. During the Roman era, Toreno gained importance as a communication hub. One of the roads, which headed northwest, had its first milestone in the town of Tombrio de Abajo. There, the road through Berlanga to Vega branched off towards Fresnedo, a road of which vestiges still remain.

An inscription dated October 2, 1082, related to the activity of Bishop Osmundo, is also preserved.

The acquisition of the lordship over Toreno and Tombrio by the banker, court moneylender, and exchanger Antonio Vázquez Vuelta in 1583 is documented, a lordship that extended until 1600. Between 1606 and 1608, it was managed by Gregorio de Velasco and Pedro de Velasco, and in 1613 it was acquired by Captain Sancho de Merás from Jerónimo Vázquez for 16,000 ducats.

However, Sancho de Merás was accused of tax fraud, and the lordship was seized by the Crown, remaining in this formal situation until 1615, although it was managed in practice by his brother-in-law Captain Suero Queipo de Llano and handed over in 1615 to the widow, Clara Queipo de Llano, who enjoyed the assets and the title of lady of the towns of Toreno and Tombrio, by testamentary disposition of her absent husband until 1630.

By that year, the lordship included Toreno (130 residents), Librán, San Pedro de Mallo, Santa Leocadia and the Barrio de Langre (another 70), and the town of Tombrio de Abajo, with 44 residents. Between 1630 and 1657, Álvaro Queipo de Llano became lord of Toreno and Tombrio, and its first count between 1657 and 1662.

In 1858, the town of Tombrio de Abajo was part of the municipality of Toreno, judicial district of Ponferrada, province of León, and its population amounted to 472 inhabitants.

Mining became the main resource of Tombrio, specifically the exploitation of coal, despite which in May 1993 the town overwhelmingly rejected a proposal from the company Antracitas del Bierzo to exploit an open-pit mine in a communal forest near the urban area.

== Local festivals ==
=== Patron saint festivals ===
The patron saint of the town is Saint Dominic of Guzmán, a festival that is celebrated on the weekend closest to August 8. These festivals run from Thursday to Sunday, offering different events: opening of wine cellars (similar to pubs), orchestra in the main square (schools) from Friday to Sunday, clay pigeon shooting, traditional games for children, rana competition, various shows.

Every year, the weekend before the festivals, a large pilgrimage in honor of St. Dominic of Guzmán is held in the natural area where the hermitage of Santo Domingo is located. Traditionally, a mass in honor of the saint was celebrated, during which offerings were made and special mention was made of St. Dominic's life. Today, the people of the town and surrounding areas celebrate this festival with popular games and a beef barbecue for everyone. To conclude the day, people enjoy the music of a small orchestra.

=== Magosto ===
The magosto is celebrated in Tombrio de Abajo during the period after the chestnut harvest, which usually takes place between late October and mid-November. This festival is celebrated in the school square with a large bonfire, roasted sausages for dinner, and hot chocolate accompanied by homemade sweets provided by the villagers.

=== Other festivals ===
To raise money for the August festivals, the town collaborates in various celebrations throughout the year. Thus, Halloween, Living Nativity scene at Christmas, popular New Year's Eve dinner (December 28), carnival, and April fair are celebrated.
