= Cabañas Raras =

- Flag Coat of arms

- Location within Spain
- Coordinates: 42°37′12″N 5°38′25″W
- Country: Spain
- Autonomous community: Castile and León
- Province: León
- Comarca: El Bierzo
- Municipality: Cabañas Raras

Government
  - Mayor: María Belén Fernández Sánchez (PSOE)

Area
  - Total: 19.11 km^{2} (7.38 sq mi)
- Elevation: 551 m (1,808 ft)

Population (2025-01-01)
  - Total: 1,286
  - Density: 67.29/km^{2} (174.3/sq mi)
- Demonym(s): cabañés, cabañesa
- Time zone: UTC+1 (CET)
  - Summer (DST): UTC+2 (CEST)
- Postal Code: 24412
- Telephone prefix: 987
- Climate: Csb
- Website: Ayto. de Cabañas Raras

Cabañas Raras (Spanish pronunciation: [kaˈβaɲas ˈraɾas]) is a village and municipality located in the region of El Bierzo (province of León, Castile and León, Spain) . According to the 2010 census (INE), the municipality has a population of 1,329 inhabitants.
