= Vega de Valcarce =

Coordinates: 42°40′N 6°56′W

- municipality
- Coat of arms
- Interactive map of Vega de Valcarce
- Country: Spain
- Autonomous community: Castile and León
- Province: León
- Region: El Bierzo
- Municipality: Vega de Valcarce

Government

Area
  - Total: 69 km^{2} (27 sq mi)
- Elevation: 631 m (2,070 ft)

Population (2025-01-01)
  - Total: 555
  - Density: 8.0/km^{2} (21/sq mi)
- Time zone: UTC+1 (CET)
  - Summer (DST): UTC+2 (CEST)
- Climate: Csb
- Website: http://www.vegadevalcarce.net/index.php

Vega de Valcarce (Veiga de Valcarce in Leonese language) is a village and municipality located in the region of El Bierzo (province of León, Castile and León, Spain) . According to a census (INE), the municipality has a population of 555 inhabitants. The mayoress is María Luisa González Santín. The village is at an altitude of 631 m (2070.21 ft), and the average rainfall is around 622.05 mm (24.49 in). The village is along the route of the Camino de Santiago, which brings tourists in the spring and summer months. There are several accommodations for these tourists. The Valcarce River runs through the village, and there are various tourist attractions throughout the village and surrounding the village as well.

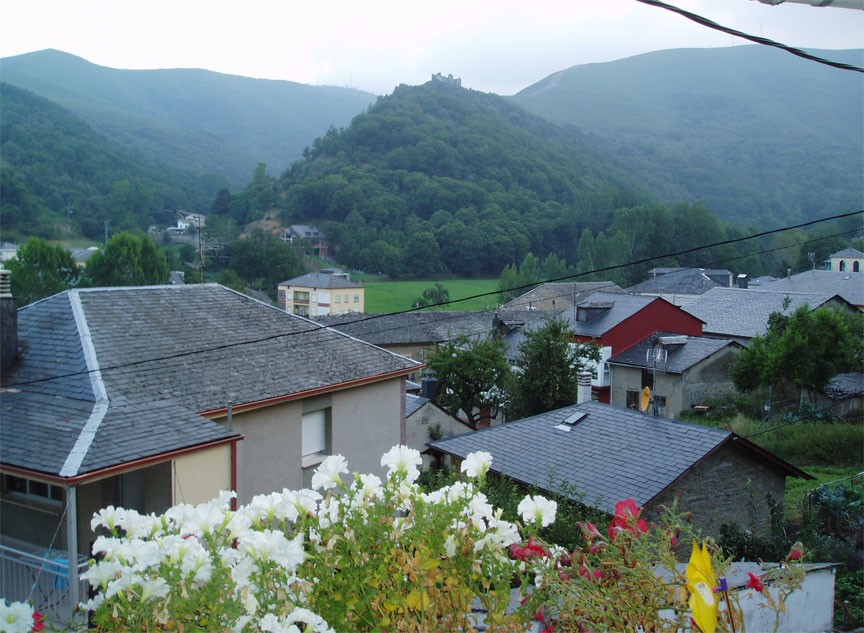
View of Vega de Valcarce

== Population Centers ==
The municipality is divided into population centers which had the following population in 2017 according to the INE.

Population Center	Population
Vega de Valcarce	205
Villasinde	66
Ambasmestas	43
Las Herrerías	39
La Faba	28
La Laguna	26
San Julián	23
La Portela de Valcarce	22
Lindoso	21
Ruitelán	20
La Braña	20
Ransinde	16
San Tirso	15
El Castro	14
Moñón	10
Cernada	9
Las Lamas	9
Laballós	9
Sotogayoso	9
Bargelas	7
Argenteiro	7
Samprón	3
La Treita	0
