= Carucedo =

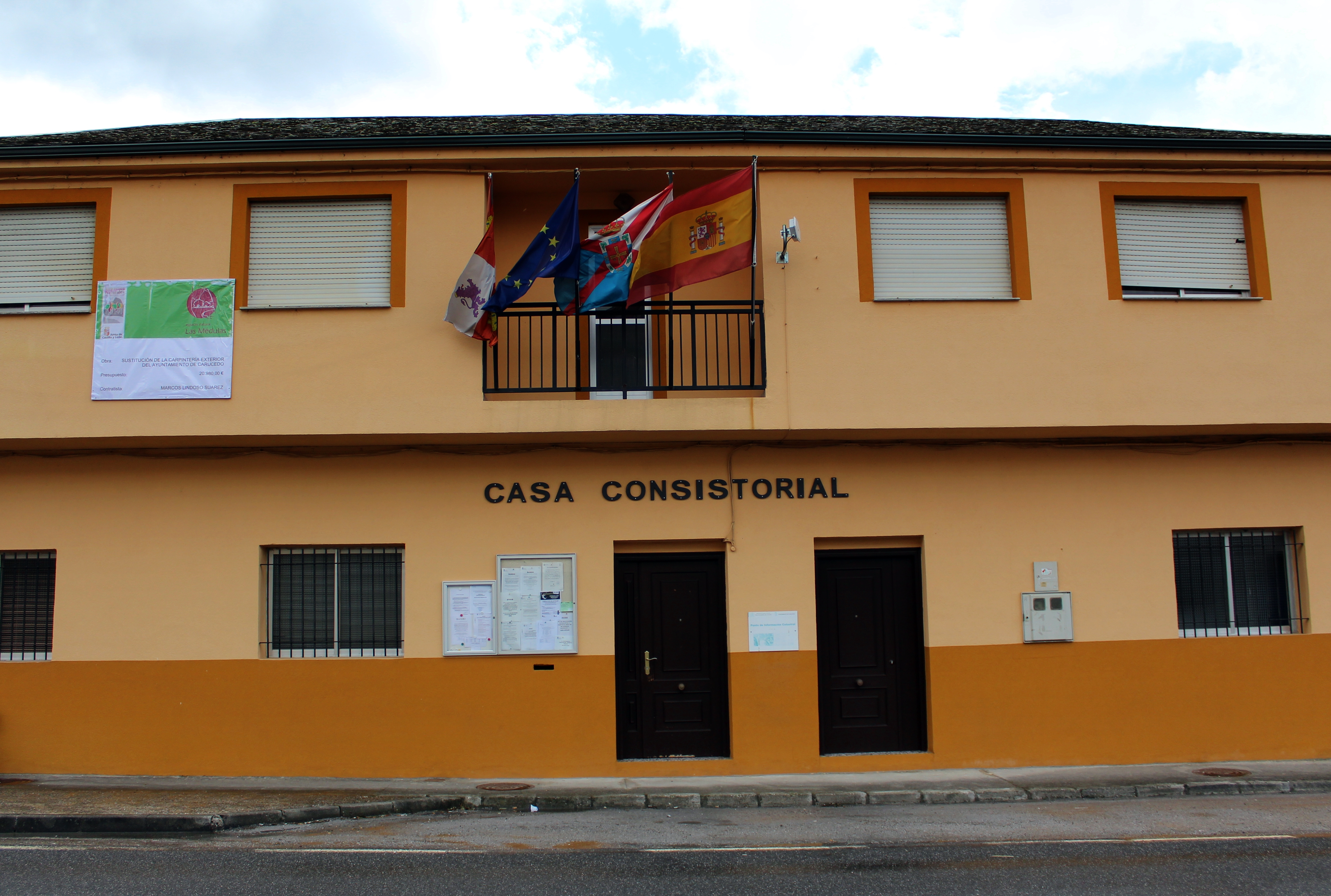
- Town hall

- Coat of arms

- Location within Spain
- Coordinates: 42°29′25″N 6°45′45″W
- Country: Spain
- Autonomous community: Castile and León
- Province: León
- Comarca: El Bierzo
- Municipality: Carucedo

Government
  - Mayor: Alfonso Fernández Pacios (PSOE)

Area
  - Total: 35.00 km^{2} (13.51 sq mi)
- Elevation: 511 m (1,677 ft)

Population (2025-01-01)
  - Total: 479
  - Density: 13.7/km^{2} (35.4/sq mi)
- Time zone: UTC+1 (CET)
  - Summer (DST): UTC+2 (CEST)
- Postal Code: 24442
- Telephone prefix: 987
- Climate: Csb
- Website: Ayto. de Carucedo

Carucedo (Spanish pronunciation: [kaɾuˈθeðo]; Leonese: Carucéu) is a village and municipality located in the region of El Bierzo (the province of León, Castile and León, Spain) . According to the 2025 census (INE), the municipality has a population of 479 inhabitants.

Situated in the comarca of El Bierzo, it is located 147 kilometres from the provincial capital, León. The municipality is crossed by the N-536, linking it to Ponferrada and El Barco de Valdeorras, and the N-122, which connects it with León and Ourense.
