= Castropodame =

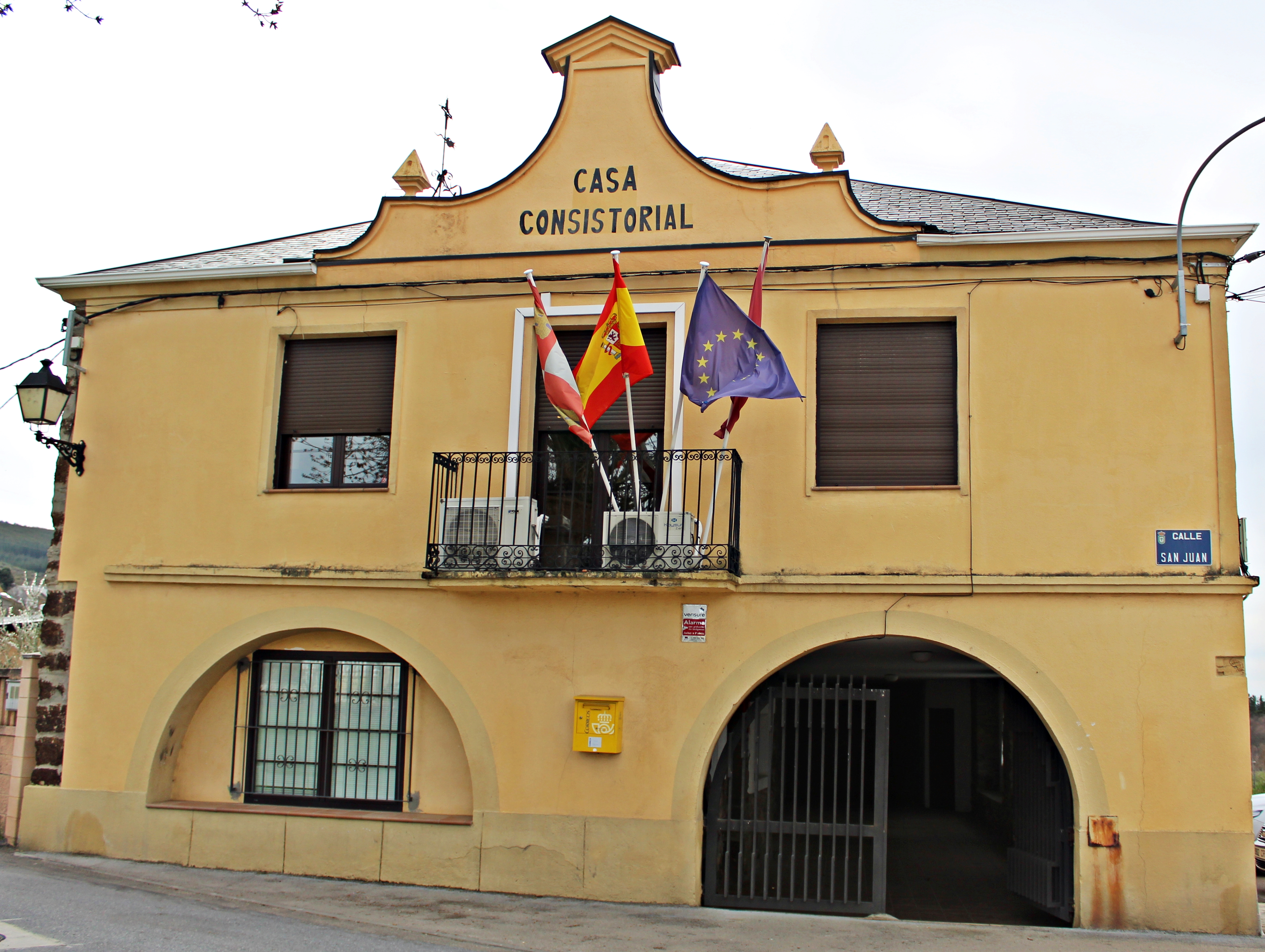
- Town hall

- Coat of arms

- Location within Spain
- Coordinates: 42°34′48″N 6°28′2″W
- Country: Spain
- Autonomous community: Castile and León
- Province: León
- Comarca: El Bierzo
- Municipality: Castropodame

Government
  - Mayor: Julio Anta González (PSOE)

Area
  - Total: 59.97 km^{2} (23.15 sq mi)
- Elevation: 747 m (2,451 ft)

Population (2025-01-01)
  - Total: 1,570
  - Density: 26.2/km^{2} (67.8/sq mi)
- Time zone: UTC+1 (CET)
  - Summer (DST): UTC+2 (CEST)
- Postal Code: 24314
- Telephone prefix: 987
- Climate: Csb

Castropodame (Spanish pronunciation: [ˈkastɾopoˈðame]) is a village and municipality located in the region of El Bierzo (the province of León, Castile and León, Spain) . According to the 2010 census (INE), the municipality has a population of 1,812 inhabitants.
