= Toreno =

Coordinates: 42°42′N 6°30′W

- municipality
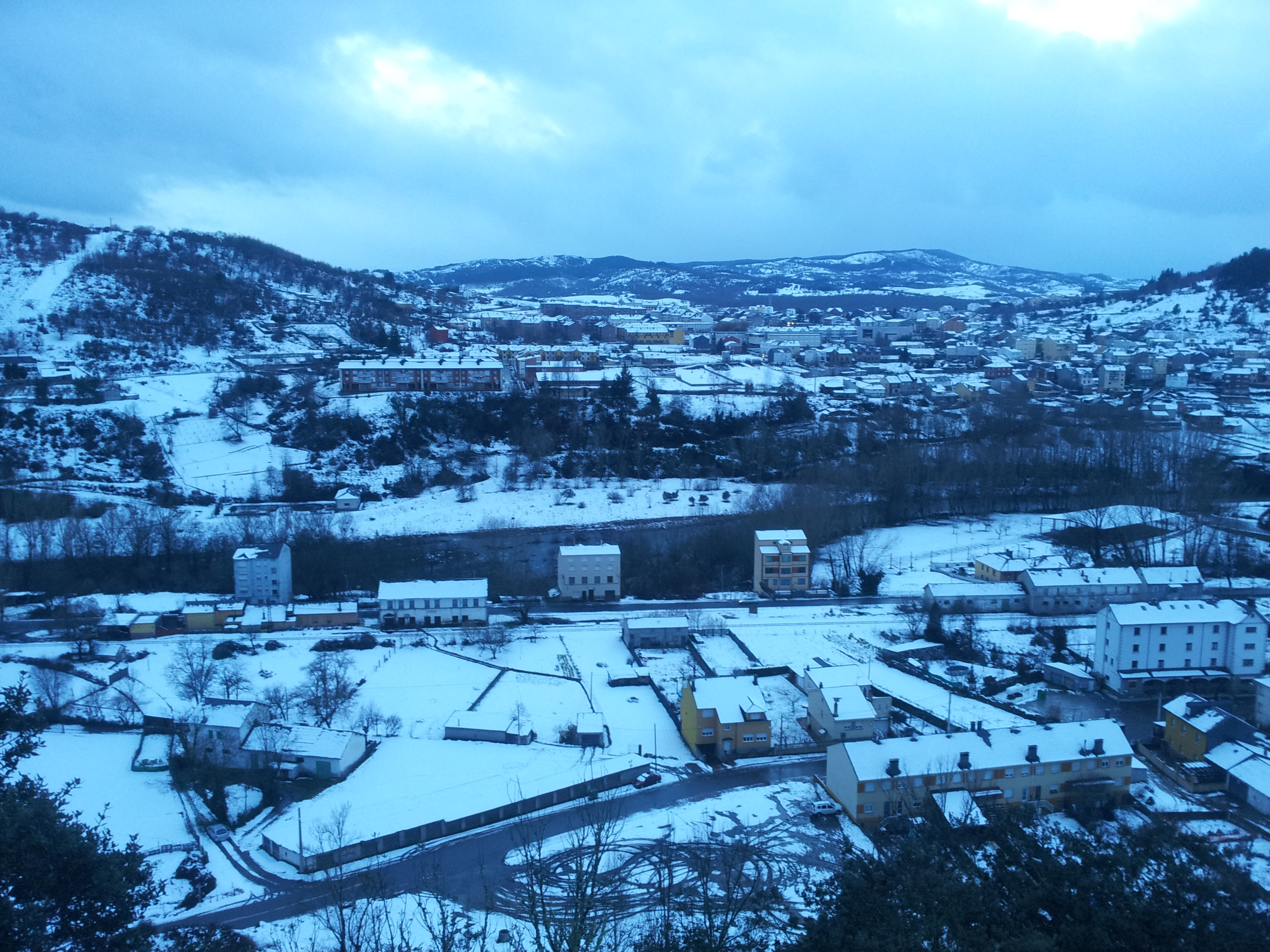

- Coat of arms
- Interactive map of Toreno
- Country: Spain
- Autonomous community: Castile and León
- Province: León
- Region: El Bierzo
- Municipality: Toreno

Area
  - Total: 103 km^{2} (40 sq mi)

Population (2025-01-01)
  - Total: 2,833
  - Density: 27.5/km^{2} (71.2/sq mi)
- Time zone: UTC+1 (CET)
  - Summer (DST): UTC+2 (CEST)
- Climate: Csb

Toreno (Leonese: Torenu) is a village and municipality located in the region of El Bierzo (province of León, Castile and León, Spain) . According to the 2004 census (INE), the municipality has a population of 3,792 inhabitants.

The town of Tombrio de Abajo is located in the municipality of Toreno.
