= Toral de los Vados =

- Coat of arms

- Location within Castile and León Location within Spain
- Country: Spain
- Autonomous community: Castile and León
- Province: León
- Region: El Bierzo
- Municipality: Toral de los Vados

Area
  - Total: 24 km^{2} (9.3 sq mi)

Population (2004)
  - Total: 2,169
  - Density: 90.4/km^{2} (234/sq mi)
- Time zone: UTC+1 (CET)
  - Summer (DST): UTC+2 (CEST)
- Climate: Csb

Toral de los Vados is a village and municipality located in the region of El Bierzo (province of León, Castile and León, Spain) . According to the 2004 census (INE), the municipality has a population of 2,169 inhabitants.
