= Arganza =

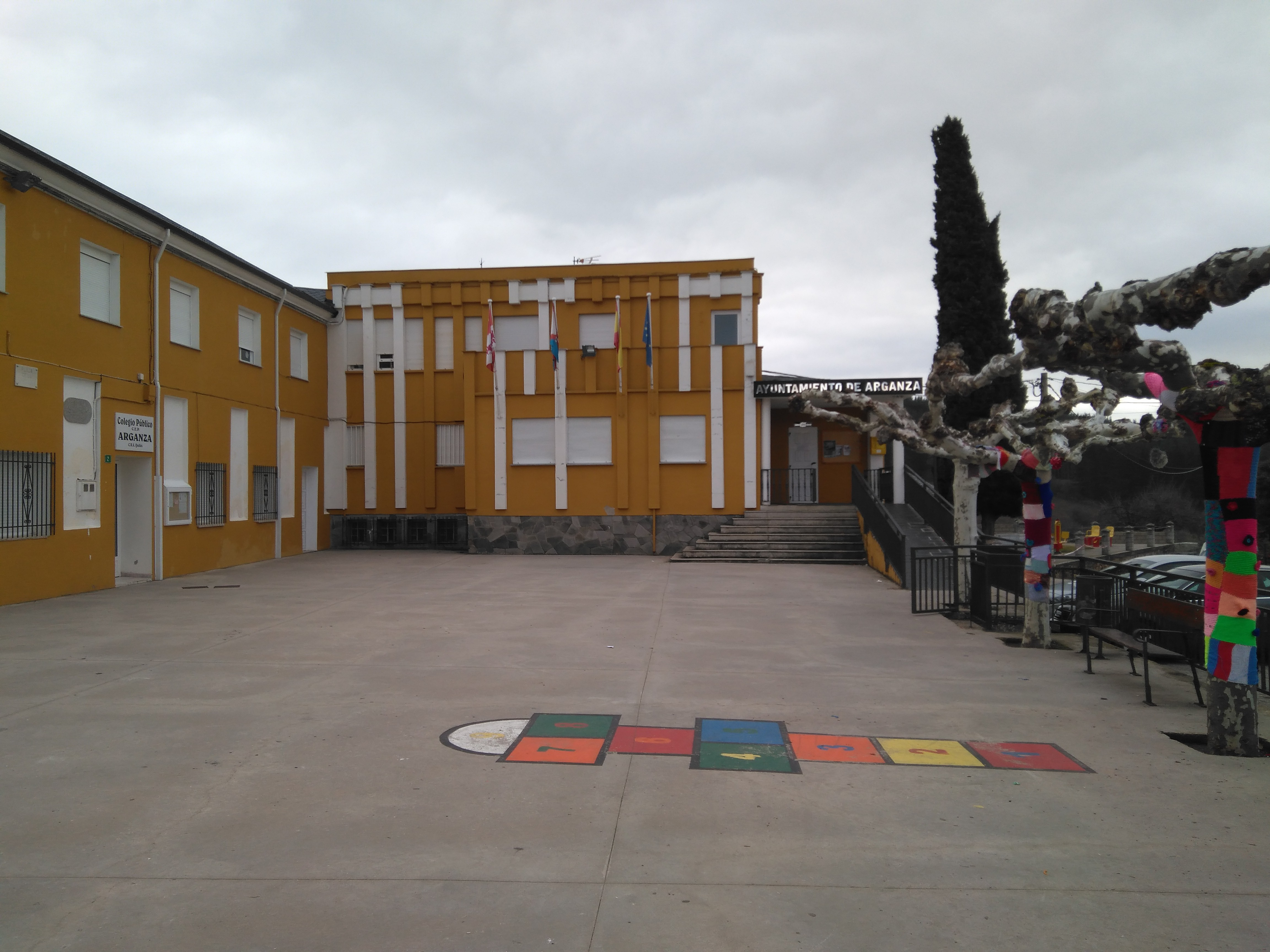
- Town hall

- Coat of arms

- Location within Spain
- Coordinates: 42°38′25″N 6°41′9″W
- Country: Spain
- Autonomous community: Castile and León
- Province: León
- Comarca: El Bierzo
- Municipality: Arganza

Government
  - Mayor: Luis Manuel González Arias (PSOE)

Area
  - Total: 39.99 km^{2} (15.44 sq mi)
- Elevation: 589 m (1,932 ft)

Population (2025-01-01)
  - Total: 800
  - Density: 20/km^{2} (52/sq mi)
- Time zone: UTC+1 (CET)
  - Summer (DST): UTC+2 (CEST)
- Postal Code: 24546
- Telephone prefix: 987
- Climate: Csb

Arganza (Spanish pronunciation: [aɾˈɣanθa]) is a village and municipality located in the region of El Bierzo (province of León, Castile and León, Spain) . According to the 2010 census (INE), the municipality has a population of 944 inhabitants while the village has 245.
