= Truchas, León =

Spanish village

Truchas Trueitas
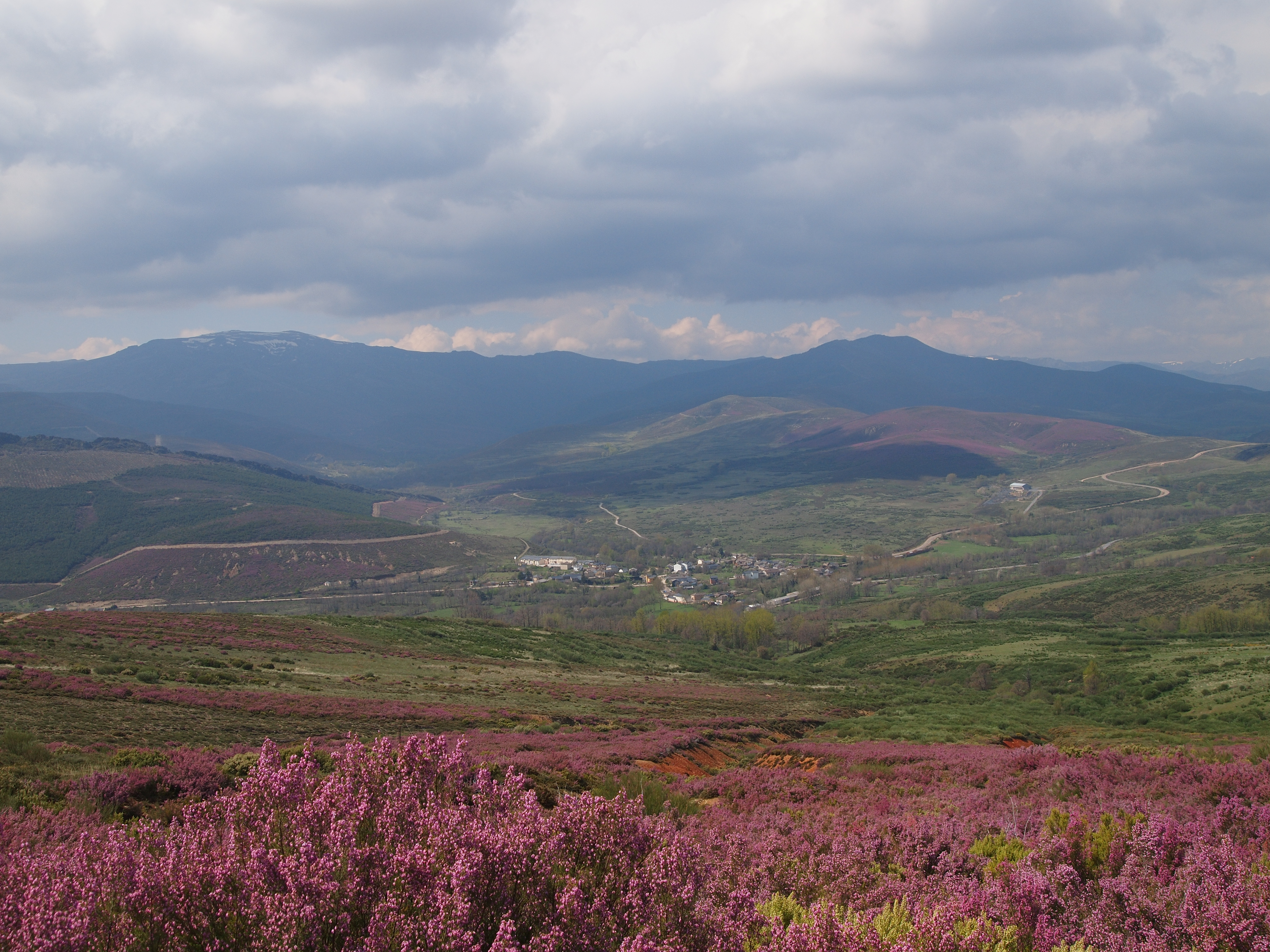
- Landscape surrounding the village of Truchas

- Flag Coat of arms

- Location within Spain
- Coordinates: 42°15′39″N 6°26′6″W
- Country: Spain
- Autonomous community: Castile and León
- Province: León
- Municipality: Truchas

Government
  - Mayor: Francisco Simón Callejo (PSOE)

Area
  - Total: 301.38 km^{2} (116.36 sq mi)
- Elevation: 1,118 m (3,668 ft)

Population (2025-01-01)
  - Total: 371
  - Density: 1.23/km^{2} (3.19/sq mi)
- Time zone: UTC+1 (CET)
  - Summer (DST): UTC+2 (CEST)
- Postal Code: 24740
- Telephone prefix: 987
- Climate: Cfb
- Website: Oficial

Truchas (Cabreirese Leonese: Trueitas) is a town and municipality located in the province of León, Castile and León, Spain. According to the 2024 census (INE), the municipality has a population of 392 inhabitants.

== Villages ==
The municipality of Truchas is made up of 13 towns:

- Baíllo
- Corporales
- La Cuesta
- Cunas
- Iruela
- Manzaneda
- Pozos
- Quintanilla de Yuso
- Truchas (seat or capital)
- Truchillas
- Valdavido
- Villar del Monte
- Villarino

== Language ==
Leonese language is widely spoken in this area. Although in a growing diglossia compared to Spanish.

== See also ==
- Cabreira Comarca
- Kingdom of León
- Leonese language
