= Benuza =

- Coat of arms

- Location within Spain
- Coordinates: 42°23′54″N 6°42′40″W
- Country: Spain
- Autonomous community: Castile and León
- Province: León
- Comarca: El Bierzo
- Municipality: Benuza

Government
  - Mayor: Rafael Blanco Blanco (PP)

Area
  - Total: 172.90 km^{2} (66.76 sq mi)
- Elevation: 792 m (2,598 ft)

Population (2025-01-01)
  - Total: 457
  - Density: 2.64/km^{2} (6.85/sq mi)
- Time zone: UTC+1 (CET)
  - Summer (DST): UTC+2 (CEST)
- Postal Code: 24389
- Telephone prefix: 987
- Climate: Csb
- Website: http://www.benuza.org/

Benuza (Spanish pronunciation: [beˈnuθa]) is a village and municipality located in the region of El Bierzo (province of León, Castile and León, Spain). According to the 2010 census (INE), the municipality has a population of 601 inhabitants.
