= Peranzanes =

Coordinates: 42°53′N 6°38′W

- municipality
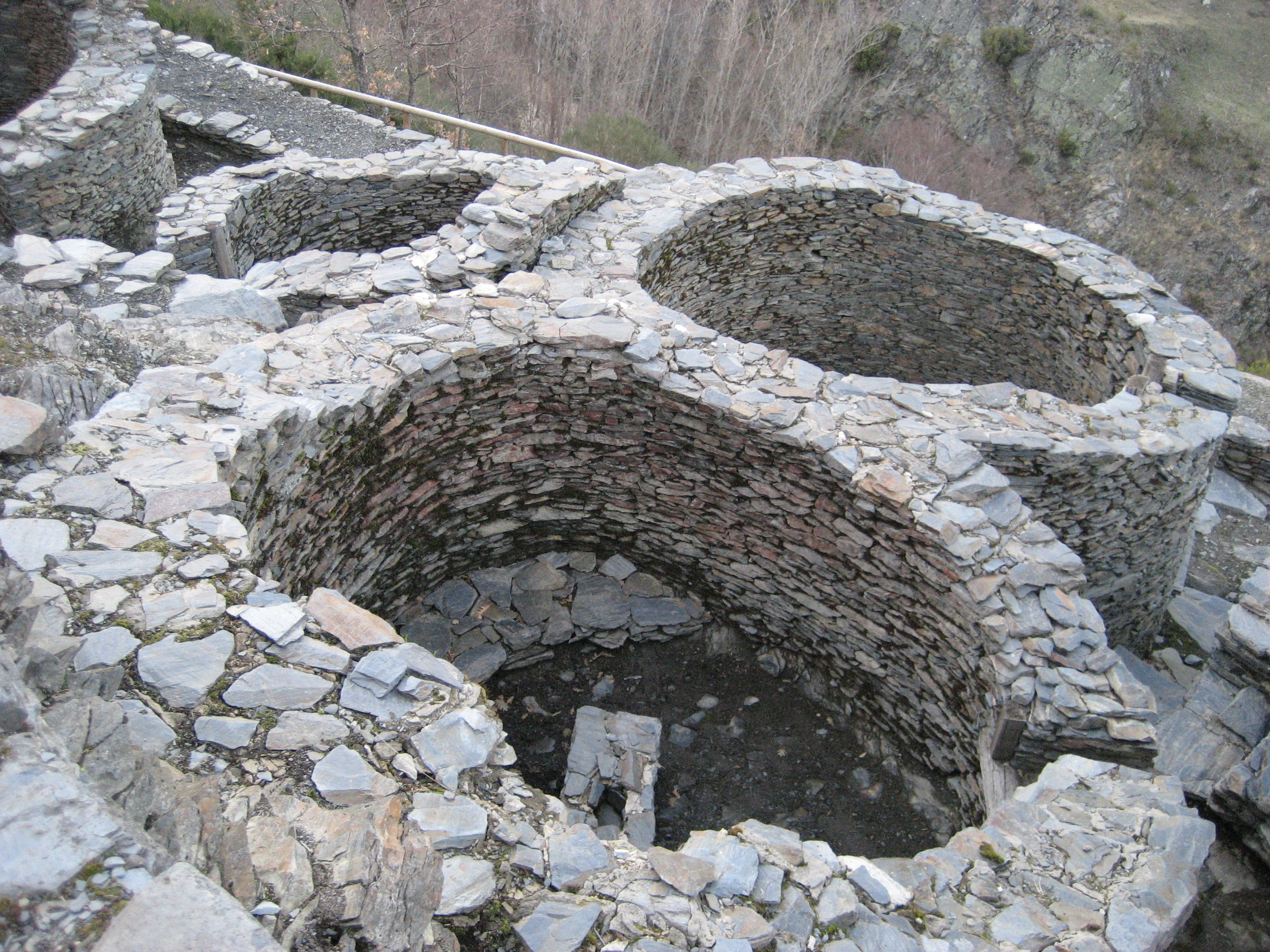
- Rests of the Castro de Chano

- Flag Coat of arms
- Interactive map of Peranzanes
- Country: Spain
- Autonomous community: Castile and León
- Province: León
- Comarca: El Bierzo

Area
  - Total: 117 km^{2} (45 sq mi)

Population (2025-01-01)
  - Total: 276
  - Density: 2.36/km^{2} (6.11/sq mi)
- Time zone: UTC+1 (CET)
  - Summer (DST): UTC+2 (CEST)
- Climate: Csb

Peranzanes (in Leonese: Peranzáis) is a village and municipality located in the region of El Bierzo (province of León, Castile and León, Spain). According to the 2004 census (INE), the municipality has a population of 329 inhabitants.

== Geography ==
Peranzanes counts the hamlets (pueblos) of Cariseda (Leonese: Careiseda), Chano (Chan), Faro (Faru), Fresnedelo (Fernidiellu), Guímara and Trascastro (Trescastru).

== See also ==
- List of municipalities of El Bierzo
