= Sobrado, León =

Coordinates: 42°31′10″N 6°51′13″W

Sobrado
- Municipality
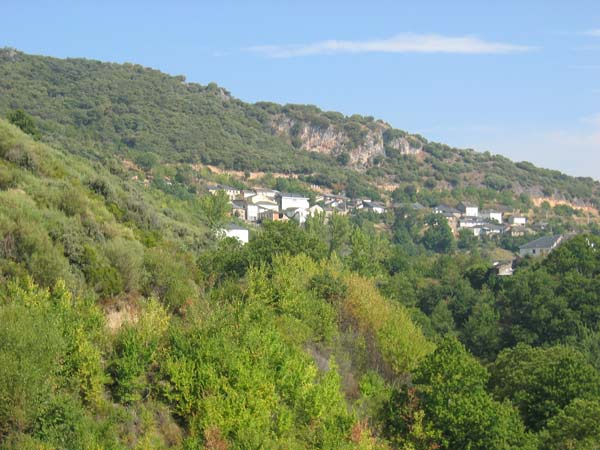
- View of Sobrado in 2005

- Coat of arms
- Interactive map of Sobrado
- Country: Spain
- Province: León

Area
  - Total: 41.01 km^{2} (15.83 sq mi)
- Elevation: 426 m (1,398 ft)

Population
  - Total: 302
  - Density: 7.36/km^{2} (19.1/sq mi)
- Time zone: UTC+1 (CET)
  - Summer (DST): UTC+2 (CEST)

Sobrado is a municipality in the province of León, Castile and León, Spain. It contains the following villages:

- Sobrado
- Aguiar
- Cabeza de Campo
- Friera
- Requejo
- Sobredo
- Cancela
- Portela de Aguiar
- Cabarcos
