= Vega de Espinareda =

Coordinates: 42°43′N 6°39′W

- municipality
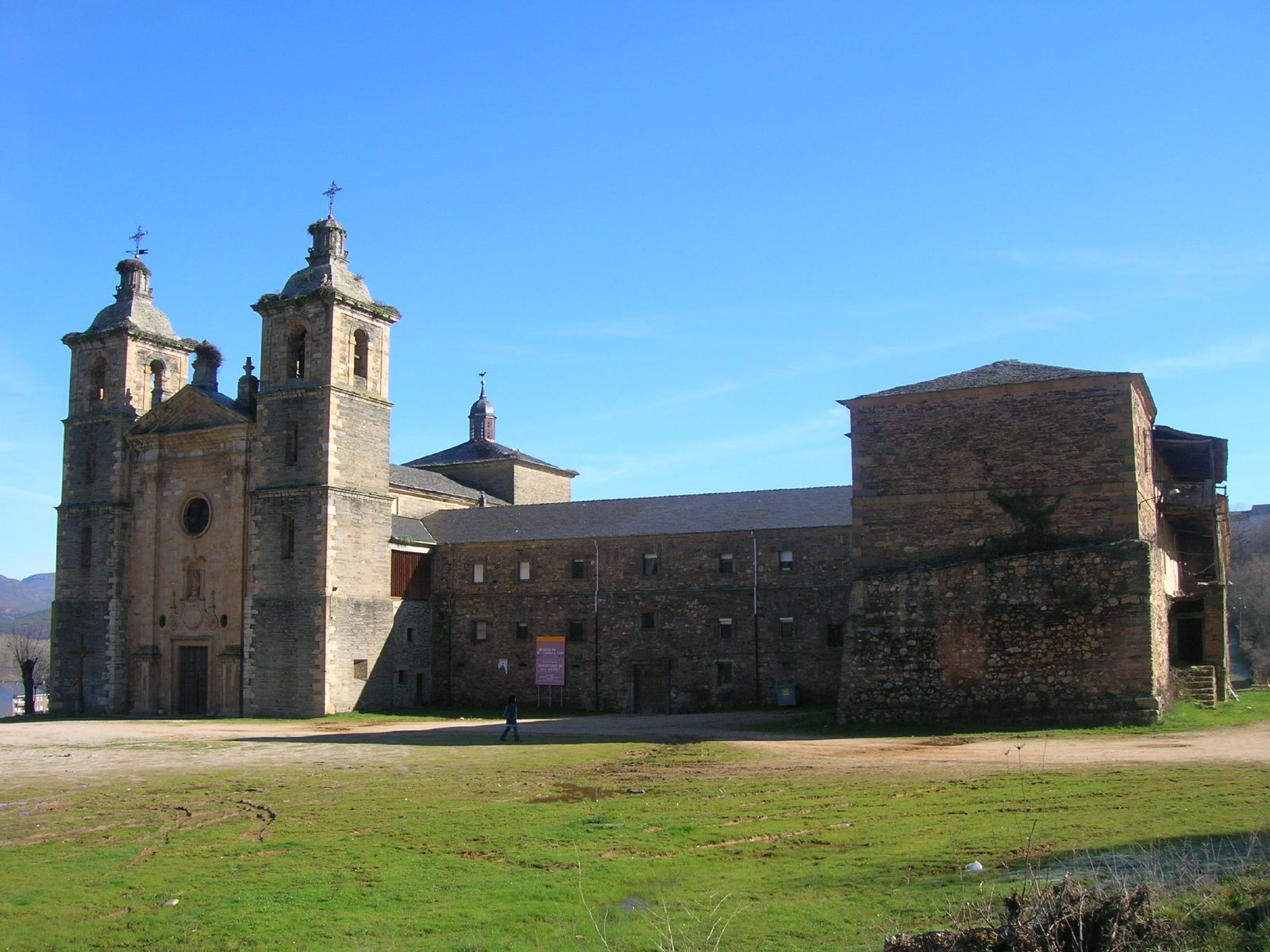
- Vega de Espinareda church.

- Flag Coat of arms
- Interactive map of Vega de Espinareda
- Country: Spain
- Autonomous community: Castile and León
- Province: León
- Region: El Bierzo
- Municipality: Vega de Espinareda

Area
  - Total: 132 km^{2} (51 sq mi)

Population (2025-01-01)
  - Total: 2,006
  - Density: 15.2/km^{2} (39.4/sq mi)
- Time zone: UTC+1 (CET)
  - Summer (DST): UTC+2 (CEST)
- Climate: Csb

Vega de Espinareda (Veiga d'Espinareda in Leonese language) is a village and municipality located in the region of El Bierzo (province of León, Castile and León, Spain) . According to the 2025 census (INE), the municipality has a population of 2,006 inhabitants.

== Population Centers ==
The municipality is divided into population centers which had the following population in 2025 according to the INE.

Population Center	Population
Vega de Espinareda	1,251
Sésamo	260
Valle de Finolledo	159
San Pedro de Olleros	87
El Espino	76
Burbia	57
San Martín de Moreda	37
Moreda	31
Espinareda de vega	20
Villar de Otero	10
Penoselo	16
La Bustarga	2
