= Páramo del Sil =

Municipality of Spain

Coordinates: 42.820°N 6.490°W

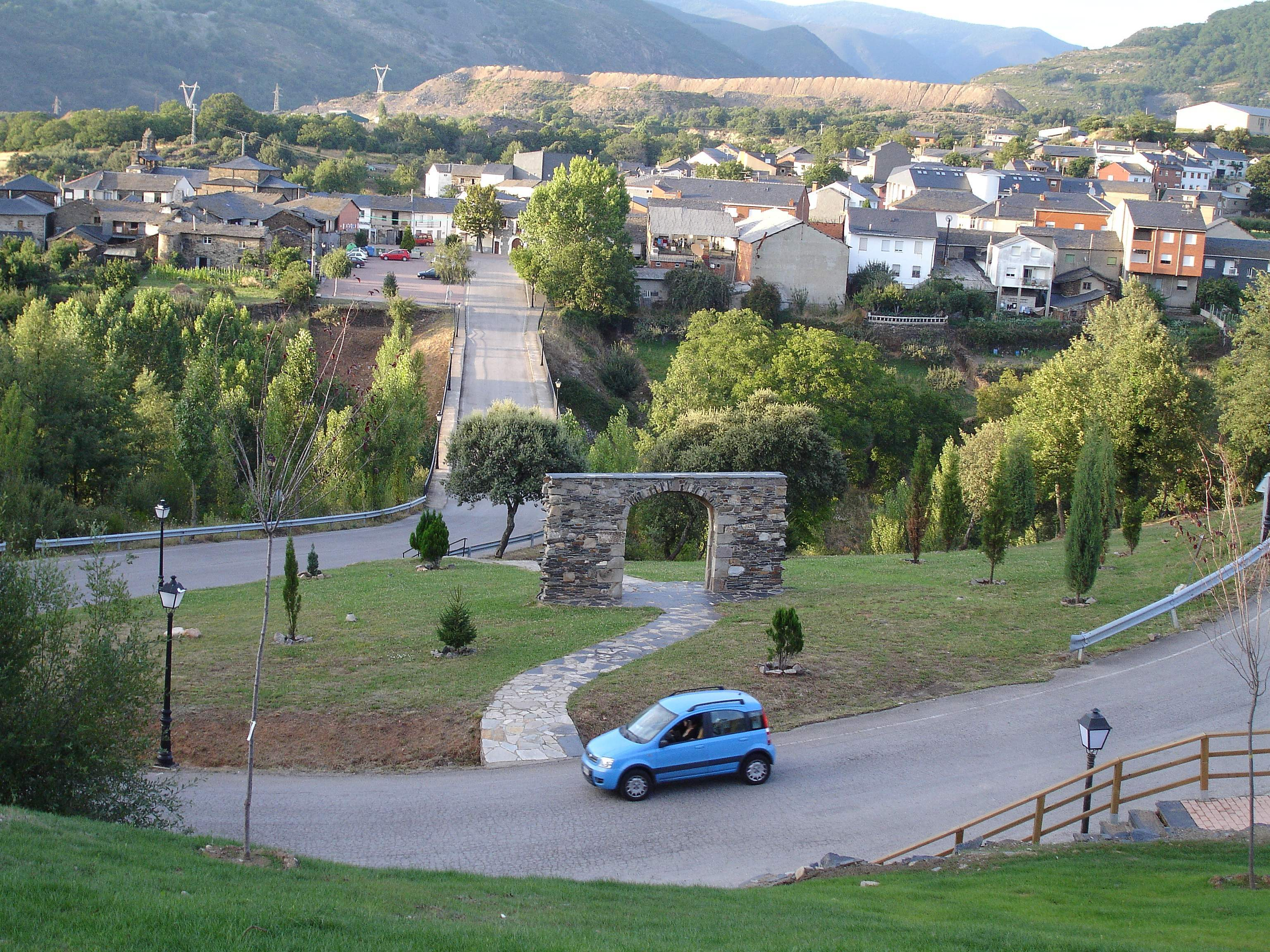
View of Páramo del Sil Neighborhood

Coat of arms of Páramo del Sil

Páramo del Sil is a municipality of Spain, in the region of El Bierzo, province of León, autonomous region of Castile and León.

The municipality is situated on the banks of the river Sil in the most northern part of El Bierzo.

Location of Páramo del Sil in Google Maps
