= Fabero =

- Coat of arms

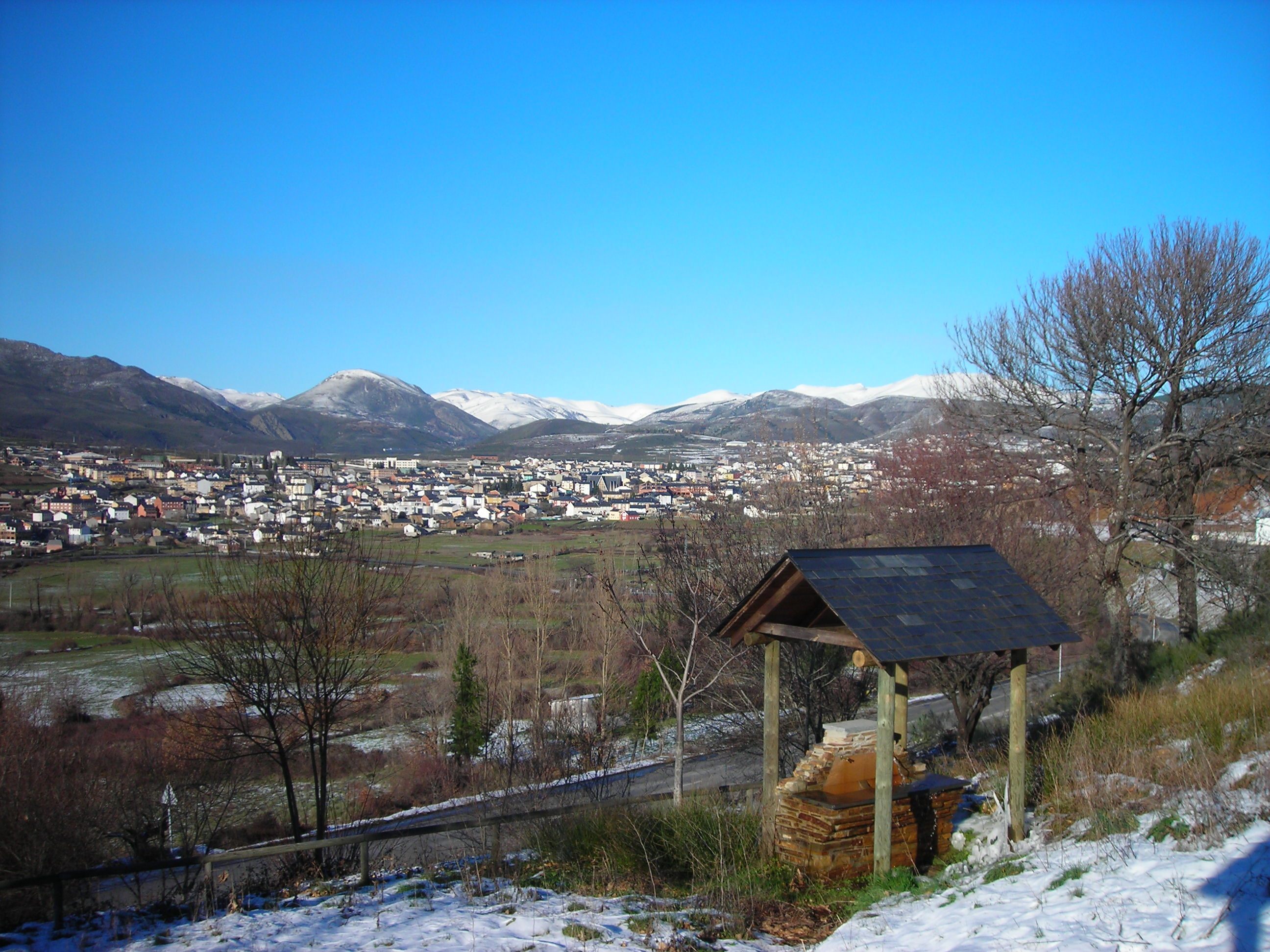
- Elevation: 676 m (2,218 ft)

Population (2025-01-01)
  - Total: 3,998
- Postal code: 24420
- Area code: +0034 987
- Website: www.aytofabero.com

Fabero (El Fabeiru in Leonese language) is a small town in the Province of León and part of the Castile and León autonomous community in north west Spain, near Galicia, with a population of about 3998 inhabitants.

The climate is continental, with hot and dry summer that can reach 36 °C though only in the daytime; it is generally cool in the evenings because of the surrounding mountains. Rainy autumns and cold winters are common.

== Surroundings ==
It is located in an area which features the mountains and villages of the Sierra de Ancares and the valley of Fornela, and other small villages scattered on the hillsides. The surrounding mountains are covered in oak trees, chestnut trees and pine forests. Wolves and brown bears can be seen in the remote mountain areas, and on rare occasions near the little villages.

The town is near the historic city of Vilafranca, a famous stage on the Pilgrims' Way to Compostela (Camino de Santiago), in the comarca of Bierzo, the wine-producing area that has become famous for the quality of its wines and vineyards.

== Local economy ==
Fabero was a small farming community of subsistence farmers until the 1920s when coal mining started because of the presence of pure anthracite coal in the ground. By the 1960s the population had risen to almost 10,000 people after a large influx of labour from the south of Spain and Portugal. The mines were underground and open cast from the 1980s, including the largest open cast coal mine in Spain. The town's famous statue of the barefoot miner is well known. The town thrived as a vibrant mining community until the first decade of the 21st century when the closing of most of the coal mines in Spain forced many to leave and find work elsewhere.

== Gastronomy ==
Fabero is in the region of the province of Leon known as El Bierzo, which is a rich agricultural area, now well known for its wines, chestnuts and horticultural products such as peppers, tomatoes, apples, pears and cherries. A mountainous region, it has a long tradition of quality cured meats, including excellent Serrano hams, chorizo (a spicy sausage) and similar preparations with cured pork meat of which the most popular is 'botillo'.

== Culture and festivals ==
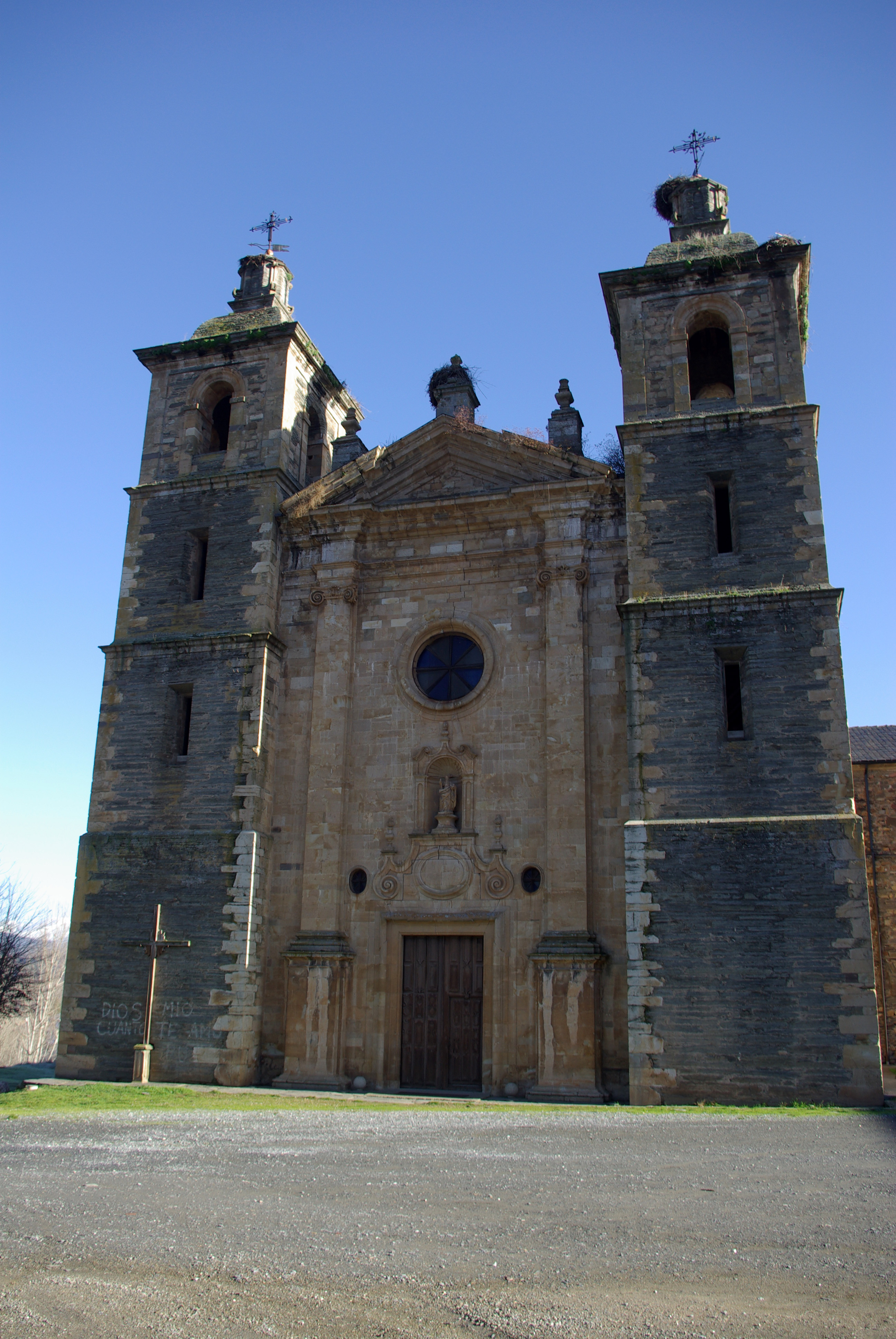
Monastery of San Andres de Espinareda

The town is vibrant in summer when the festive season is more intense in all the surrounding villages and towns, particularly after mid-June. The town organizes summer courses in painting and sculpture in conjunction with the Fine Arts Department of the University Complutense of Madrid, which are organized by the associate dean of the university Tomas Bañuelos Ramón. In 2016 the most famous living Spanish painter, Antonio Lopez, was the special guest, as was the sculptor, Julio Lopez. Both were special guest speakers and they involved themselves in the five-week-long summer courses.

Given the mining tradition of the area, there is the Museum of the Mine (Pozo Julia). This museum traces the history of the mines in the area, the kind of equipment and tools used and the methods of extraction.

From a more historical perspective, there is a monument commemorating a labour camp for Republican prisoners made to work in the coal mines after the Civil War.

A Celtic settlement and Neolithic cave paintings can be seen nearby and a glacial lake called the Pozo Cheiroso is situated near the town. The Roman past of the province is very visible in the area, particularly in the city of Leon, and one can also visit the remains of the Roman gold mines in the area of Las Medulas.

This is a region with a long history dating back to the Middle Ages. The nearby Monastery of San Andres de Espinareda was started in the 12th century though the existing buildings date from the 18th century.

== Sport and outdoor activities ==
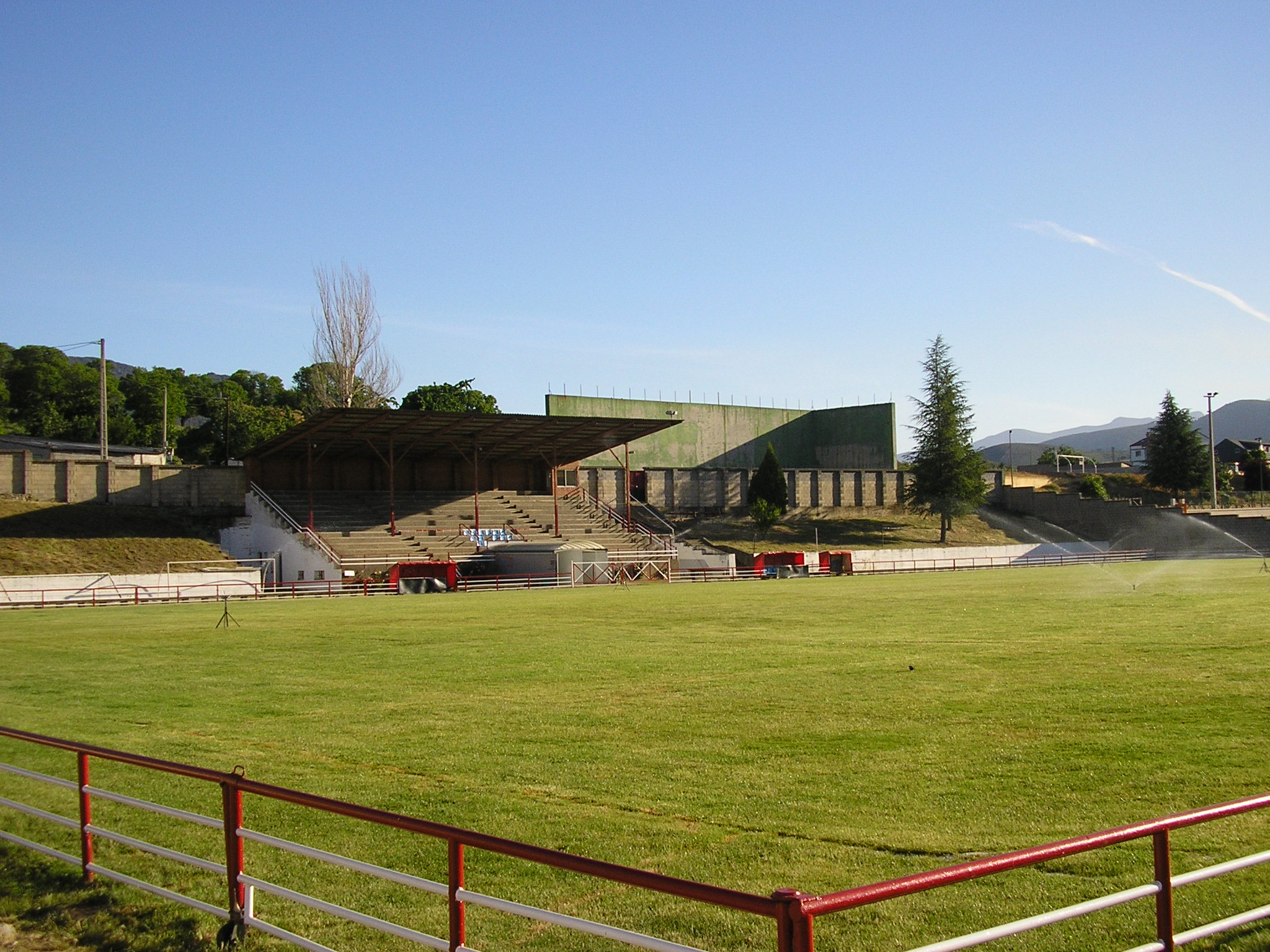
Football field of Fabero

The surrounding hills and mountains offer great opportunities for rambling, biking, trekking and horse-riding.

The town has an outdoor and indoor swimming pool and a football ground. The local team is in the first regional division. There are leisure centres in nearby Ponferrada.

Trout fishing is popular in the local rivers and mountain streams.

== Twinning ==
The city is twinned with two towns in Portugal:

	País		Localidad
(Portugal)	Portugal	20px	Vila Pouca de Aguiar
(Portugal)	Portugal	20px	

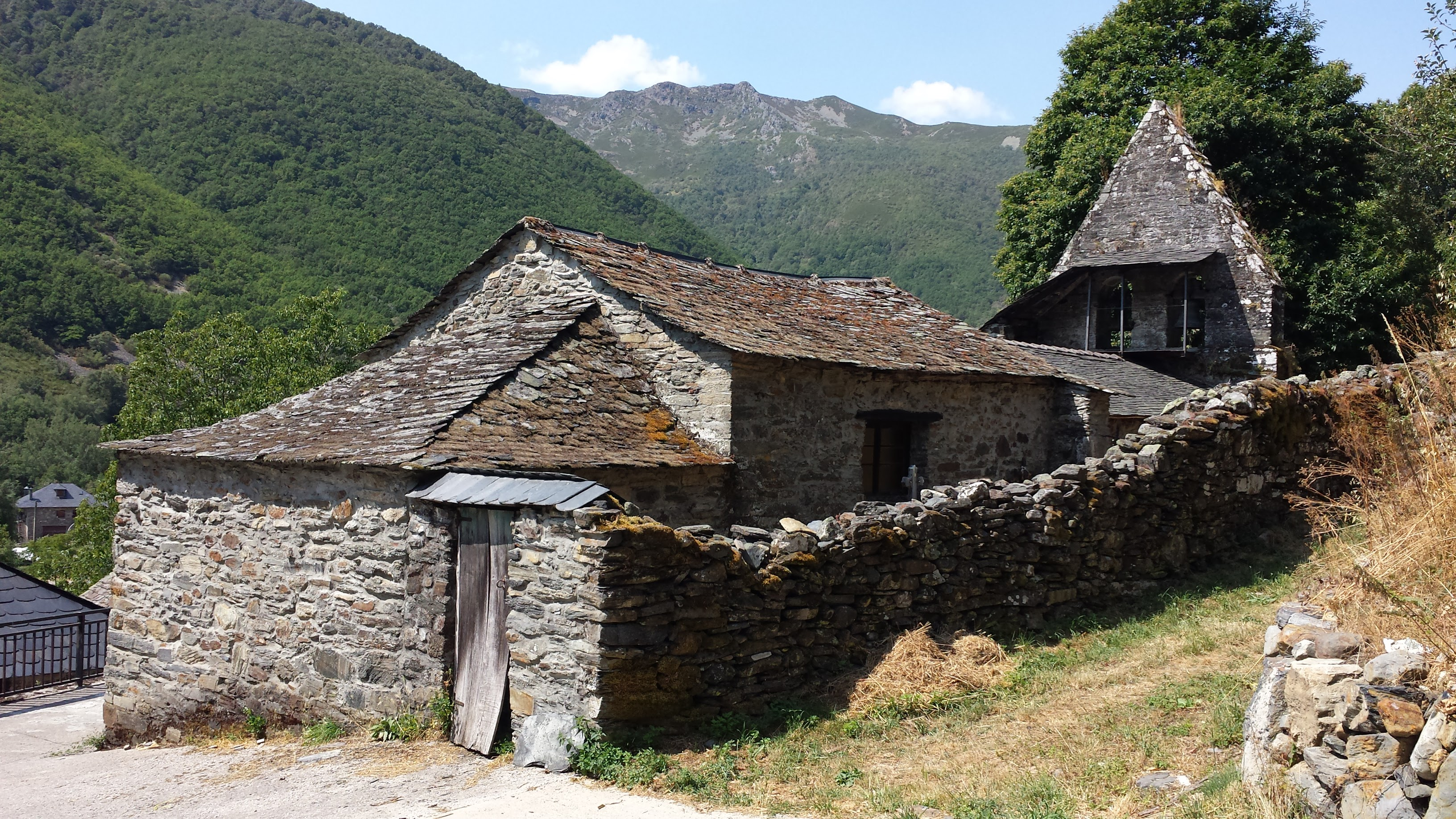
Tejedo de Ancares (Bierzo). Leon. Spain

== See also ==
- El Bierzo
- Manuel Orallo
