= Puente de Domingo Flórez =

- Municipality
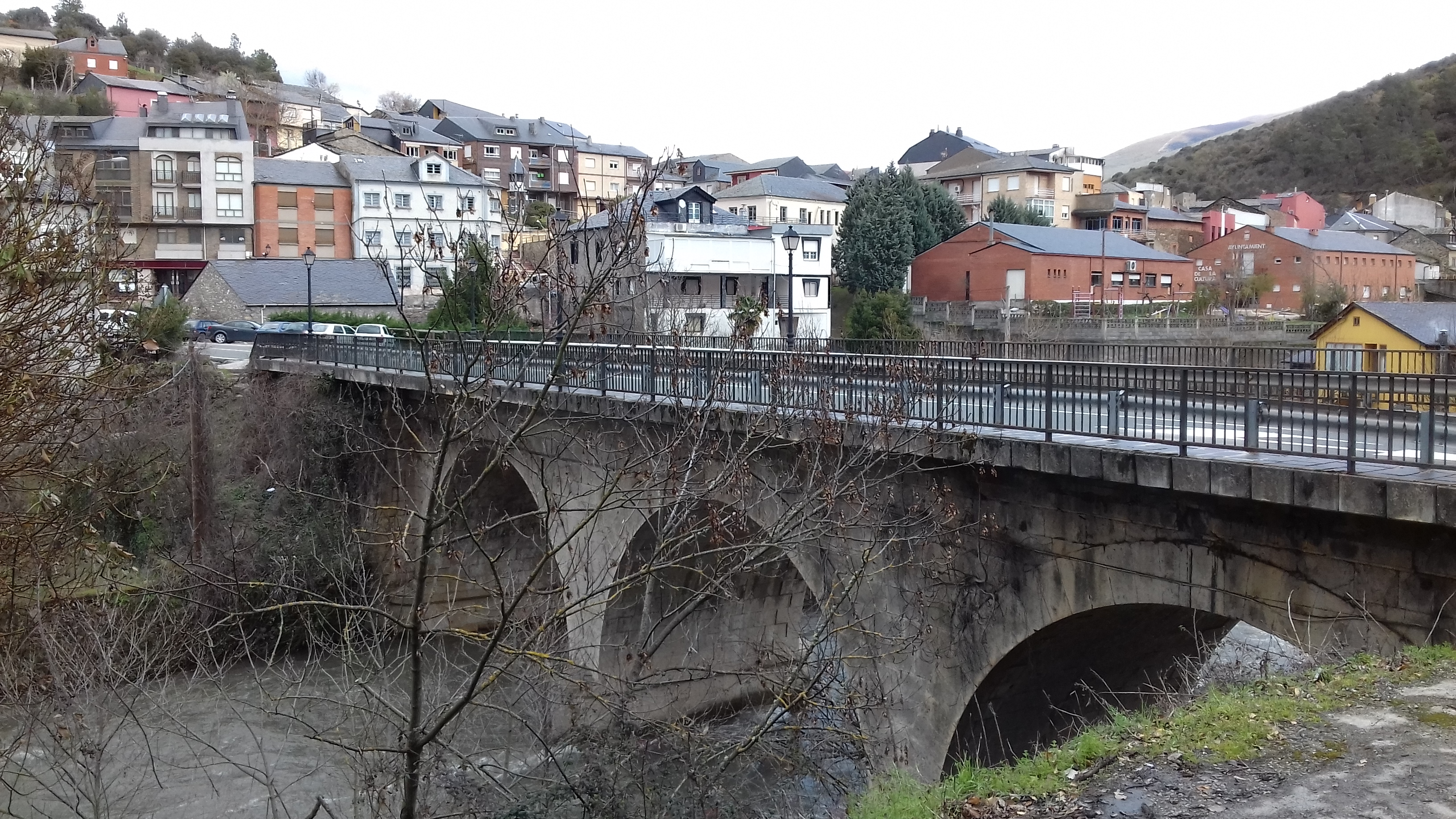

- Coat of arms

- Location within Castile and León Location within Spain
- Coordinates: 42°24′N 6°49′W
- Country: Spain
- Autonomous community: Castile and León
- Province: León
- Comarca: El Bierzo

Area
  - Total: 59 km^{2} (23 sq mi)

Population (2025-01-01)
  - Total: 1,348
  - Density: 23/km^{2} (59/sq mi)
- Time zone: UTC+1 (CET)
  - Summer (DST): UTC+2 (CEST)
- Climate: Csb

Puente de Domingo Flórez (Spanish pronunciation: [ˈpwente ðe ðoˈmiŋɡo ˈfloɾeθ]) (Puente Domingu Flórez, in Leonese language) is a village and municipality located in the region of El Bierzo (province of León, Castile and León, Spain) . According to the 2025 census (INE), the municipality has a population of 1,348 inhabitants.

== Economy ==
The village's economy depends on the slate indutry.

In 1639 at the end of the 17th century there were iron mines near the village.
