= Carrea =

Parish in Teverga, Asturias, Spain

Coordinates: 43°8′N 6°4′W

Carrea is one of thirteen parishes (administrative divisions) in Teverga, a municipality within the province and autonomous community of Asturias, in northern Spain.

The place in Carrea, where 27 people live, is 5 km (3.10 mi) of La Plaza, the capital of the council. Situated at 700 m (2,300 ft) above sea level, it is 7.0 km^{2} (2.7 sq mi) in size with a population of 50 (INE 2006). The postal code is 33111. It is divided into 5 barriers: La Calecha, Llaveseo, La Quintana, Carrozal and Orillero.

== The other parish divisions of Teverga ==
- Barrio (Barriu; Bairru)
- La Focella (La Fouciecha; La Foceicha)
- La Plaza
- Páramo (Parmu)
- Riello (Rieḷḷu)
- San Salvador d'Alesga
- Santianes
- Taja (Taxa)
- Torce
- Urria
- Villamayor (Viḷḷamor)
- Villanueva (Viḷḷanueva; Viḷḷanuöva)

== Villages and hamlets ==
- Carrea
- Sobrevilla (Sorvilla)
