= Western Asturian =

Western dialect of Asturian language

- Region: Spain (Asturias); Portugal (Northeastern)
- Ethnicity: Asturians
- Language family: Indo-European: Italic; Latino-Faliscan; Latin; Romance; Italo-Western; Western Romance; Iberian Romance; West Iberian; Asturleonese; Asturian; Western Asturian
- Writing system: Latin

Language codes
- ISO 639-2: ast
- ISO 639-3: ast
- Glottolog: west2339
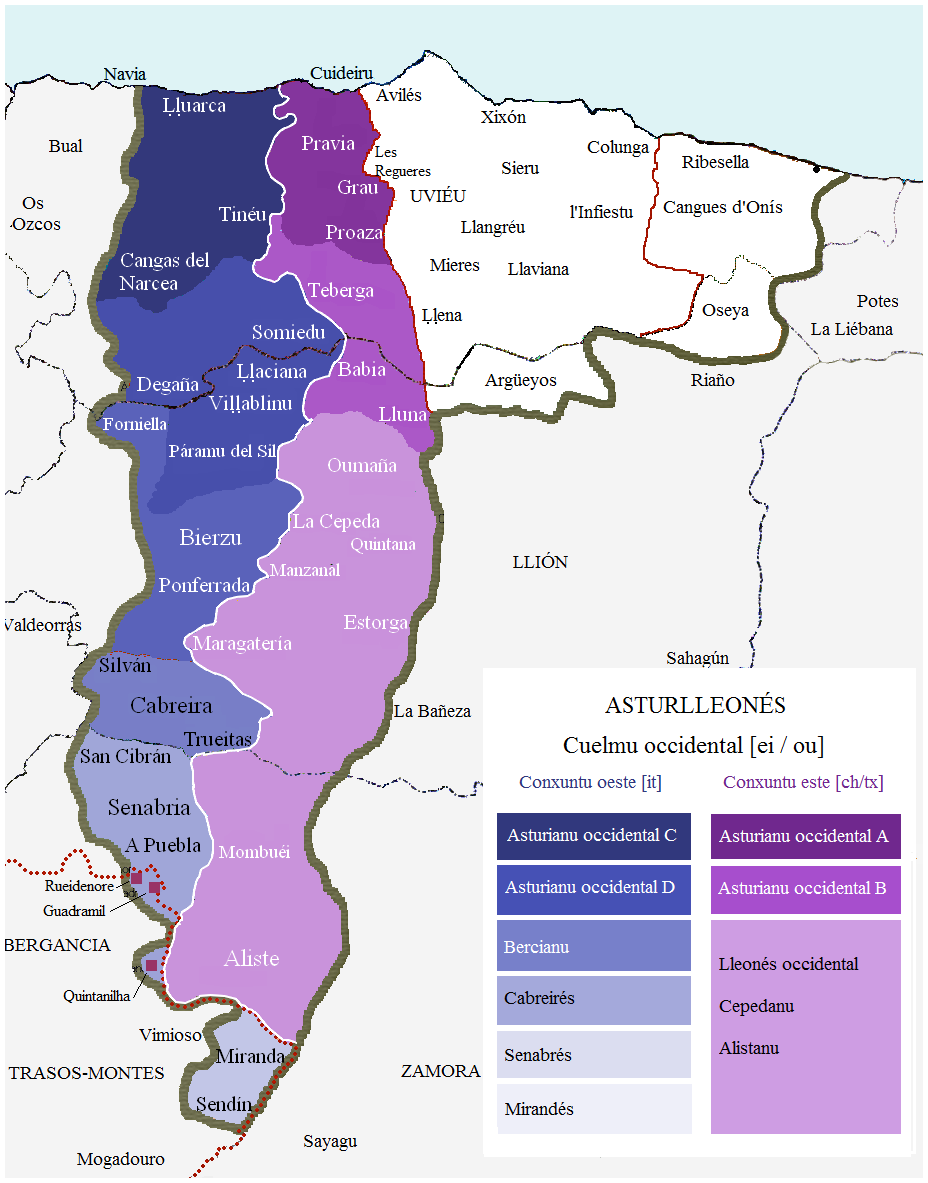
- Area speaking Western-Asturian

Western Asturian (/ˈwɛstən æˈstʊəriən/; asturianu occidental [astuˈɾjanʊ]), is the western dialect of Asturian language spoken in western Asturian lands between the Navia and Nalón rivers, and north of the province of León.

== Area spoken ==
- Asturias: The border with central Asturias is an almost straight line that joins the councils of Muros and Quirós from north to south. The Navia river separates it from the Entrambasauguas area.
- León: Western Asturian is spoken in the councils of Babia and north of Luna (Eastern Highlands) and in the councils of Laciana and Ribas de Sil (Western Highlands).

== Linguistic regions ==
According to the consonantism, Diego Catalán divides Western Asturias into four regions:

=== Eastern Lowlands ===
It includes the councils of Muros, Candamo, Grado, Cudillero and Pravia. Common vocalism of the West and consonantism typical of the central zone:

- Conservation of the old decreasing diphthongs /éi, óu/: veiga, cantéi, touro, cantóu.
- Possibility of three diphthongs for the short Latin vowels /e/ and /o/: /ié-ya/ yara/year, ya/y, /ué-uá-uó/ puablu-pueblu-puoblu .
- Unstressed vowel closure: -u-us, -i -is, -a/-as // u-os, -u-es. -a/-es: gatu/gatus, fonti/fontis, vaca/vacas. In some places (Pravia or Cudillero) there is a strong tendency to close the final vowels /-i, -u/.
- Conservation of -oriu, -oria in agreement with the central languages: Cobertoria, taladraoria, casoriu .
- Palatization /ll/ for derivatives of /l-, -ll-, pl-, kl-, fl-/: lluna, valle, llave, llover, llama. Not being inside the word where it develops /y/: ayalga.
- /ñ/ for /-nn-/: cabin; and frequency of initial /ñ/ palatalization: ñarbasu, ñarigón.
- /ch/ from /kt, ult/: trucha, cuchu, munchu.
- /y/ coming from /ly, k'l/: muer, vieya. A particularity of this region is that /-y-/ after a palatal vowel can disappear: viea - vieya, abea - abeya, ouvea - ouveya, ourea - oureya.

At the morphological level, in some places (Pravia) there are cases of feminine nouns adjectived in /-u/, which indicates the extension to the West of the continuous/discontinuous opposition: La tierra tá ricudíu. Within this region is located the Cudillero speech called pixueto.

Ellu fuoi that Nola sat down, miroulas already said: - You don't know what you're thinking about you: 'Fierve'l lleichi, cuoz la manteica, fumia lus churizus, bringi la barreña, llimpia'l suolu que ta puorcu…', that if estu ya lu outru. Caseimi en dumingu ya'l miou maríu dexe-y pulu claru que yara you más reina, ya asina murriu'l rey. Mira que sou viea ya cartei abondus caldeirus peru inxamás lus homes fourun a abangami. Non sou you buona uvea pa colus llobus.

— Candamo y Proaza (Note: Translated using Google Translate. Translation has large issues and needs correction.)

Tell me what this village is already like in the amphitiatru arrudiadu all the tile houses that go up to the bare walls. Prestarati caminallu pur sous caleyas que subin ya baixan, guliandu a peixi fritu, ya dispiartánduti la fami. The landscape of Cuideiru tianis that vellu at a distance, from the sea; enjoy sou ambianti and amirar nun namais el partu, sinun lus cantilis de Vidiu, nus qu'hay un viayu faru, ya ondi úisi'l viatu suplar. On the main cai there are shops that contain all the rillaciunadu navigation tail: nudus marineirus, apareus, cabus, and uxetus artisanalis feichus with shells. The piasca amenorguíu sees few years, peru Cuideiru resurfaced with puxu when the tourists discovered the place.

— Cudillero

=== Eastern Highlands ===
It comprises Quirós, Teberga, Proaza and penetrates the Leonese lands of Babia and north of Luna.

- The vocalism basically agrees with region A, although there is a lesser tendency to close the final vowels /i, u/, although there is no uniformity between the parishes. Quirós shows a greater number of endings /e, o/ú there are no endings in -us/-un comierun, xatus, which is understood as pronunciations of Teverga .
- -oriu or, -oria in consonance with the language: Cobertoria, taladraoria, casoriu.
- /ḷḷ/ instead of /ll/ from region A: ḷḷuna, vaḷḷe, ḷḷave, ḷḷover, ḷḷama. Not being inside the word where it develops /y/: ayalga.
- /-n-/ < nn, instead of /-ñ-/: pena, cabana, farina.
- As in region D, result /ch/ for /ly, k'l/: mucher, viecha.
- Unique in the whole of Asturias, the result /ts/ < /kt, ult/: cutso, mutso, otso, cotse .

This region establishes the limit of the ya/yas 'is, you are'; specifically in Teverga, being already unknown in Quirós (except in the parishes of Bermiego, Ricao and Faeo). The speech of Quirós or quirosano presents its own and original features that give it a certain personality within the region.

=== Western Lowlands ===
It includes the low valleys of Cangas del Narcea, Tineo and Luarca.

- Vocalism agrees with the two previous regions. There is a greater number of decreasing diphthongs due to the vocalization of certain final consonants in an inner group. nueite, truita, muitu .
- -oiru, -oira with metathesis of /i/: versatoriu > versadoiro, Cubertoira.
- Consonantism that coincides with region A for /y/ from /ly, k'l/: muyer, vieya.
- Consonantism that coincides with region B in the solution /ḷḷ/: ḷḷuna, vaḷḷe, ḷḷave, ḷḷover, ḷḷama. Not being inside the word where it develops /y/: ayalga.
- Coexistence of results /ch/ and initial /ḷḷ/ for the groups /pl, kl, fl/: chuver/ḷḷover.
- Insertion of /u/ due to the influence of /w/ in the following syllable: augua, lleugua, yeugua, fraugua, senauguas 'petticoat' etc.
- In this region we can distinguish the contractions conjunction plus article nu < in+illu and nel < in+ille. The former is used before a consonant: nu camin, nu chanu, while the latter is used before a vowel nel eiru, nel uzal.

=== Western Highlands ===
It includes Somiedo, brañas of Cangas del Narcea, Degaña and enters the Leonese lands of Laciana and Ribas de Sil. Vocalism and consonantism that coincides with region C, not being in the result /ch/ from /ly, k'l/ in mucher, navacha, and from /-cl-, -pl-, and -fl -/: achalga, as occurs in region B. Within this region is the speech Trabáu in Degaña and the parishes of El Bau and the Estierna both in Ibias called tixileiru.

The classification criteria for Western Astur-Leonese are presented in the following table.

== Lexical differences ==
Normative	Eastern Lowlands	Eastern Highlands	Western Lowlands	Western Highlands	Bercian	Cabreiran Leonese[es]	Senabrian Leonese[es]	Mirandese
*lauretum > lloréu	llouréu	ḷḷouréu	ḷḷouréu	ḷḷouréu	llouréu	llouréiru	llouréiru	lhouro
*afflaticam > ayalga	ayalga	achalga	ayalga	achalga		ayalga	allalga	
*plovere > llover	llover	ḷḷover	ḷḷover/chover	ḷḷover/chover	chuvere	chuvere	chuvere	chober
*lactem > lleche	lleiche	ḷḷeitse	ḷḷeite	ḷḷeite	lleite	lleiti	lleiti	lheite
*noctem > nueche	nueche	nuetse	nueite	nueite		ñueiti	ñuoiti	nuite
* multu > munchu	muchu	mutsu	muitu	muitu	muitu	mueitu	muitu	muito
*capanna > cabaña	cabaña	cabana	cabana	cabana	cabana	cabaña	cabaña	cabanha
*oculo > güeyu	güeyu	güechu	güeyu	güechu		güeyu	guollu	guolho
* mulier > muyer	muyer	mucher	muyer	mucher		muyere	mullere	mulher

== Sample text ==
Cuatro ḷḷobus baxonun pul vaḷḷe de Ḷḷaciana. Fuonun diciendu a Sumiedu ḷḷume, ḷḷeite, ḷḷinu, ḷḷana. Unu d’eiḷḷus baxou esplayase iḷḷina xunta Santibañe de la Ḷḷomba onde afayou una ugüeya y díxu-ye: - Ugüeya vou añuesgate que teu muita fame.

-¿Agora mesmamente que tou criandu dous fiyus? Déixalu pa más p’alantre, y entoncias nun pundréi reparu dengún.

El ḷḷobu aceptou-y el reḷḷatu y dexouse cunvencere. Creyéu güenus lus aḷḷegatus de la ugüeya, dexóula y fouse rabu ente piernas pur si n’outra parte yera muxor recibidu. A lus poucus días, vulviéu a purfiare untavía cun más fame. La ugüeya repitióu-y las razones y ón sacou outras nuevas. El ḷḷobu nun se cunvencía, y la ugüeya propuso q’unus carneirus y una yegua que pacían nu Cutáu, dieran sou faḷḷu n’aquel pleitu: Si debía añuesgala ensin asperare más, u si tenería obligación de deixala hasta ver lus fiyus criaus.

— Faza C (Note: Needs translation.)

Lus gochus pasaban cuasi tou’l día nu campu la Cuérguila. La xente ḷḷevábalus pula mañana ya pula tardiquina cada unu recuchía el dél. A lus guchinus prestába-ḷḷes muitu tar pur aiḷḷí, purque yara un bon ḷḷugare pa fuzare na ḷḷueza ya revulcáse. El tíu Carape mandaba tous lus días la sua gocha que tinía siete guchinus. Peru’n día que marchóu pal ríu Pedrosu pur un carráu de ḷḷeña tardóu muitu ya nun chegóu a buscare la gocha antis d’escurecere. Yara de nueite piechu cuandu la gocha quixu dáse cuenta tinía delantre un ḷḷubazu arregañándu lus culmieḷḷus ya metiéndu-ḷḷe miedu a eḷḷa ya lus guchinus. Entre lus gochus ya’l ḷḷobu había una presa que diba dar a un mulín. Ya dixu la gocha: - Ḷḷobu, asperaba pur ti, pa que me pasaras lus guchinus. Si nun me los pasas póngome a gruñire ya vien el mieou amu ya mátate. Peru si m’ayudas a pasálus, doíte pa ti'l furón.

— Faza D. Cangas de Narcea

== See also ==
- Asturian language
- Asturian article about the dialect
