= Taladrid =

- Parish
- Location within Spain
- Coordinates: 42°58′N 6°44′W
- Country: Spain
- Autonomous community: Asturias
- Province: Asturias
- Municipality: Ibias

Population (2024)
  - Total: 68

Taladrid is one of eleven parishes in the municipality of Ibias, within the province and autonomous community of Asturias, in northern Spain. In 2020, it had 38 inhabitants. In the 1849 geographical dictionary published by Pascual Madoz, it is described as follows:

SENA (San Agustín): parish in prov. and dioc. of Oviedo (18 leag.), juridical part of the Grandas de Salime (8), council of Ibias (3): sit. near the r. with the same name with free airflow and healthy climate. It has some 90 houses in the v. with its name and in Bao, Llanedo, Sisterna, Villadril, Villardecendias and Villarmeirin. The par. church (San Pedro) is served by a curate and laic patrons. There are also 6 hermits native to the vicinity. Bordered by the par. of Tormaleo, Alguerdo and Degaña. The terrain has hills and flats; it has, to the N., the high sierras of Muniellos and Piedradecreta, from whence come down many streams to the mentioned r. Ibias. Prod.: corn, barley, wine, turnips, honey, acorns, potatoes, grass: cows are raised, and also pigs, sheep and goats; hunting and fishing of various kinds. Ind.: agriculture and flour mills. Pop.: 97 h., 485 souls.

== Villages and hamlets ==
- Taladrid Population 2024 - 10
- Llanelo Population 2024 - 10
- Villaoril Population 2024 - 10
- Villardecendias Population 2024 - 21
- Villarin Population 2024 - 9
- Villarmeirin Population 2024 - 8
