= Házael González =

Spanish writer (born 1976)

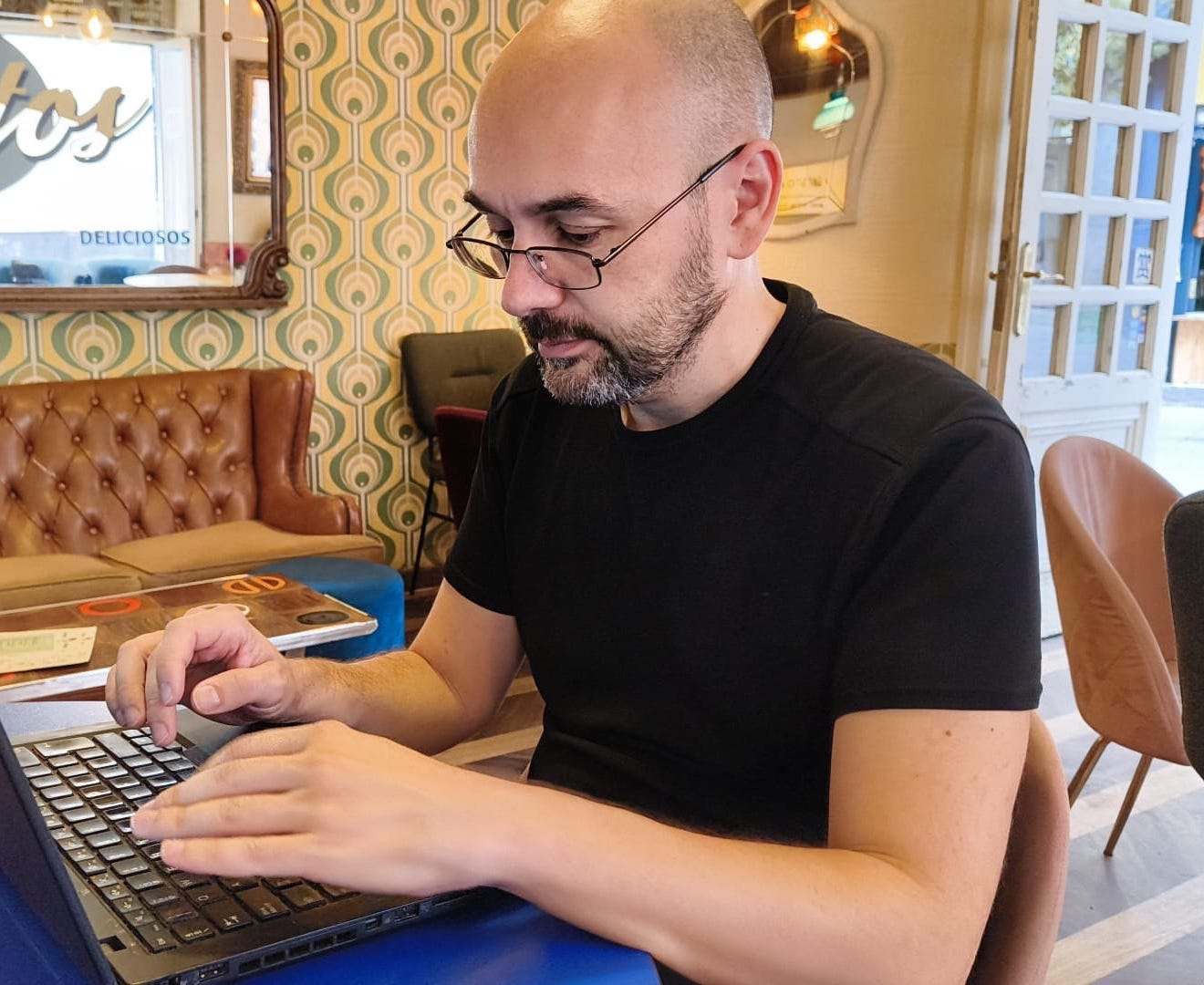
- Born: Házael González Álvarez; 18 February 1976 (age 50); Zarréu, Asturias, Spain
- Occupations: Author, novelist
- Writing career
- Language: Spanish
- Genre: Fantasy literature
- Website: www.instagram.com/tierraincontable/

Házael González (born 18 February 1976, Zarréu, Asturias) is a Spanish writer, specializing in fantasy literature. His most well-known work is the literary cycle Historias de la Tierra Incontable, published since 2012.

== Biography ==
He has a degree in Art History from the University of Barcelona (UB) and a Master in Cultural Heritage (Research and Management) from the University of the Balearic Islands (UIB). In addition to his role as a writer, he collaborates every fortnight as a columnist for the newspaper Ultima Hora and for the web magazine specializing in fantastic cinema, Scifiworld, writing reviews on fantasy literature. In addition, he has worked as a film and comic critic in specialized magazines such as Volumen Dos, Top Cómic, Hentai, Wizard or Dolmen.

He has also been a radio host on stations such as Ona Mallorca or IB3 Ràdio and lecturer on journalism, advertising and protocol at the ESERP university for more than a decade. He is a member of the Associació Balear d'Amics de les Bandes Sonores (ABABS), dedicated to the promotion and dissemination of film music, with which he has collaborated on multiple occasions and participated in the XXXII Meeting of Writers and Critics of the Spanish Letters held in Pendueles (Llanes, Asturias), among other activities.

Finally, and in parallel to his work as a writer, he incorporated edition into his literary activity.

== Works ==
=== Fantasy literature ===
Historias de la Tierra Incontable. From 2012 to 2017, six volumes were published and from 2019 Dolmen Editorial undertook its reissue, with corrections and additions, and the publication of subsequent titles. He later returned to the genre with Petranio, his last creation.

- Círculo Primero: el Despertar. Alberto Santos, 2012. ISBN 978-84-15238-40-9; Dolmen Editorial, 2019. ISBN 978-84-17389-90-1
- Círculo Segundo: Viaje a la Profundidad. Alberto Santos, 2013. ISBN 978-84-15238-46-1
- Círculo Tercero: la Música del Mundo. Alberto Santos, 2014. ISBN 978-84-15238-64-5
- Historias Élficas. Alberto Santos, 2015. ISBN 978-84-15238-86-7
- Historias de la Verdadera. Alberto Santos Editor, 2016. ISBN 978-84-94536-82-3
- Círculo Cuarto: las Manos del Tiempo. Alberto Santos, 2017. ISBN 978-84-947250-0-5
- Historias de Sirenas. Dolmen, 2019. ISBN 978-84-17389-89-5
- Petranio. Documenta Balear, 2026. ISBN 978-84-19956-97-2

=== Comic ===
- Arn, el Navegante. Dolmen Editorial, 2021. ISBN 978-84-18510-83-0 (script by Házael González, illustrations by Raulo Cáceres)

=== Zombie literature ===
- La Muerte Negra. Dolmen, 2010. ISBN 978-84-937544-4-0
- Quijote Z. Dolmen, 2010. ISBN 978-84-937544-8-8

=== Film music ===
- Música per al Nou Mil·lenni. Documenta Balear, 2006. ISBN 978-84-96376-73-1
- Casino Royale. La Música de las Películas de James Bond. Alberto Santos, 2014. ISBN 978-84-15238-68-3

=== Essay ===
- Danzando con la Realidad: las Creaciones Meta-Artísticas de Alejandro Jodorowsky. Dolmen, 2011. ISBN 978-84-15201-22-9

=== Travel literature ===
- La vuelta al mundo en 111 días. Plan B Publicaciones, 2021. ISBN 978-84-17956-89-9

=== Children's story ===
- ¿De qué están hechos los sueños? Alberto Santos, 2015. ISBN 978-84-15238-88-1
- ¿Dónde está Halloween? Disset, 2024. ISBN 978-84-96199-61-3

=== Others ===
- Kama Sutra Japonés. Robinbook, 2007. ISBN 978-84-7927-888-5
