= Castillo de Alesga =

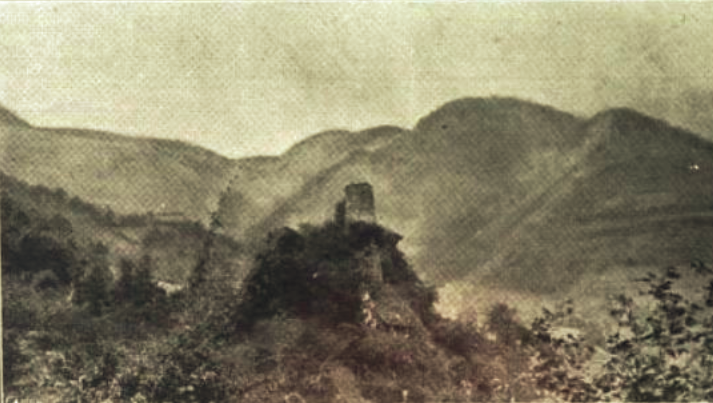
Depiction in La Esfera, 1921

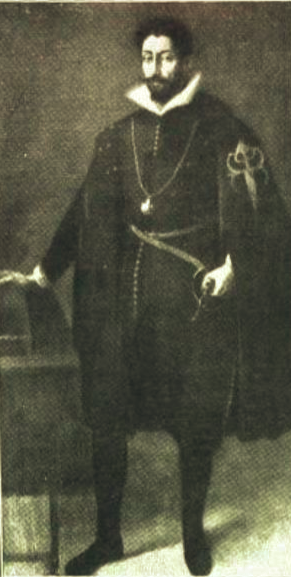
Don Sancho Alonso de Miranda

Castillo de Alesga is a ruined Spanish fortress. It is situated on a hillside in San Pedro Valley near the town of San Salvador d'Alesga, in the council of Teverga, Asturias. It is situated near the Puerto de Ventana. A large square tower at its center measures about 20 by 40 meters (66 ft × 131 ft). The remains of a small circular tower and a section of drywall are visible. Although the current structure is medieval, it is speculated that it was originally a Roman tower. The tower is mentioned as early as 1122. In the 15th century, it was owned by the Casa de Miranda. Elements of the Iron Age exist in its ruins.

== See also ==
- List of castles in Spain

== Sources ==
- FANJUL PERAZA, A., MENÉNDEZ BUEYES, L., y ÁLVAREZ PEÑA, A. (2005): La fortaleza de Alesga (Teverga, Asturias): una posible turris de control altoimperial" (trans. From the Asturian Solar. The House of Miranda.), Gallaecia 24, pp. 181–191.
