= Tudela Castle (Asturias) =

Ruined castle in Asturias, Spain

Coordinates: 43.3047°N 5.8112°W

- Castillo de Tudela
- Santianes, Oviedo, Asturias, Spain
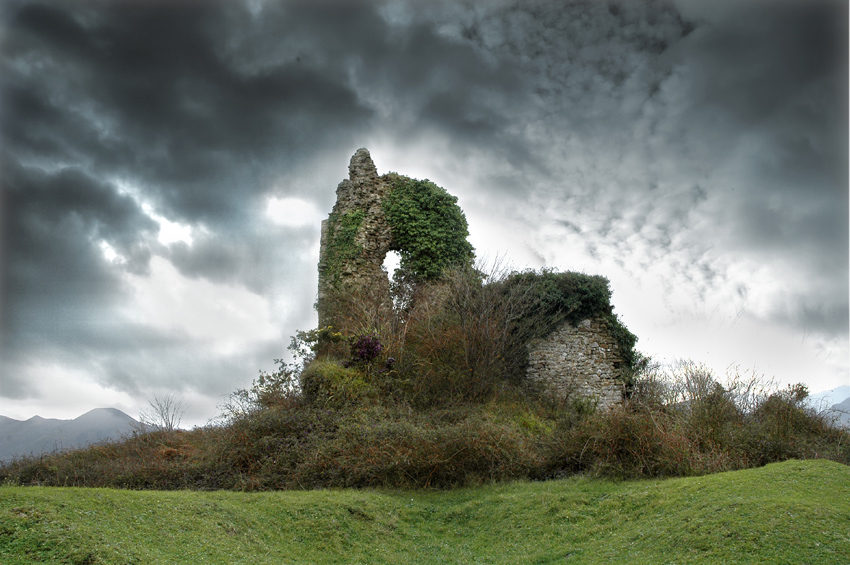

Site information
- Type: Castle
- Condition: Ruined

Tudela Castle (Spanish: Castillo de Tudela) is an ancient ruined fortress located in La Focara, which belongs to the Asturian parish of Santianes, around the city of Oviedo (Spain).
