= Cecos =

- Parish
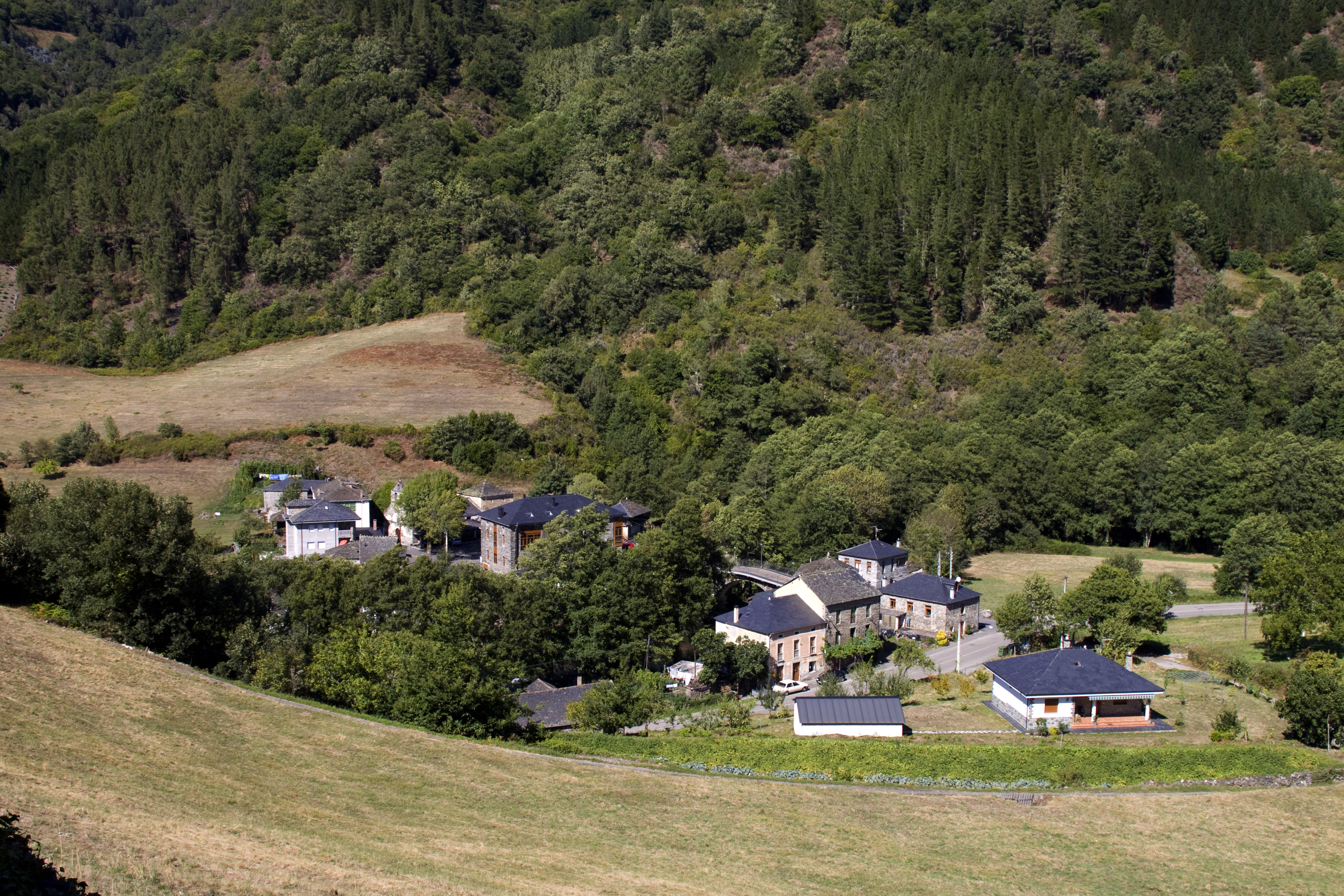

- Location within Spain
- Country: Spain
- Autonomous community: Asturias
- Province: Asturias
- Municipality: Ibias

Cecos is one of eleven parishes (administrative divisions) in the municipality of Ibias, within the province and autonomous community of Asturias, in northern Spain, bordering Degaña. In 2020, it had 176 inhabitants. The village dates to the 10th century, and has many examples of late medieval architecture.

== Villages and hamlets ==
Official name	Population		
Official name	Total	Men	Women
Boiro	18	9	9
Bustelo	23	19	4
Cadagayoso	9	5	4
Carbueiro	4	3	1
Cecos	38	22	16
Centenales	6	4	2
Folgueiras de Boiro	15	10	5
Lagüeiro	21	12	9
Mergulleira	8	4	4
Pousadoiro	3	1	2
Rellán	2	0	2
San Esteban	10	6	4
Villamayor	9	6	3
Villarcebollín	10	6	4
