= Pelliceira =

Pelliceira Piliceira
- Parish
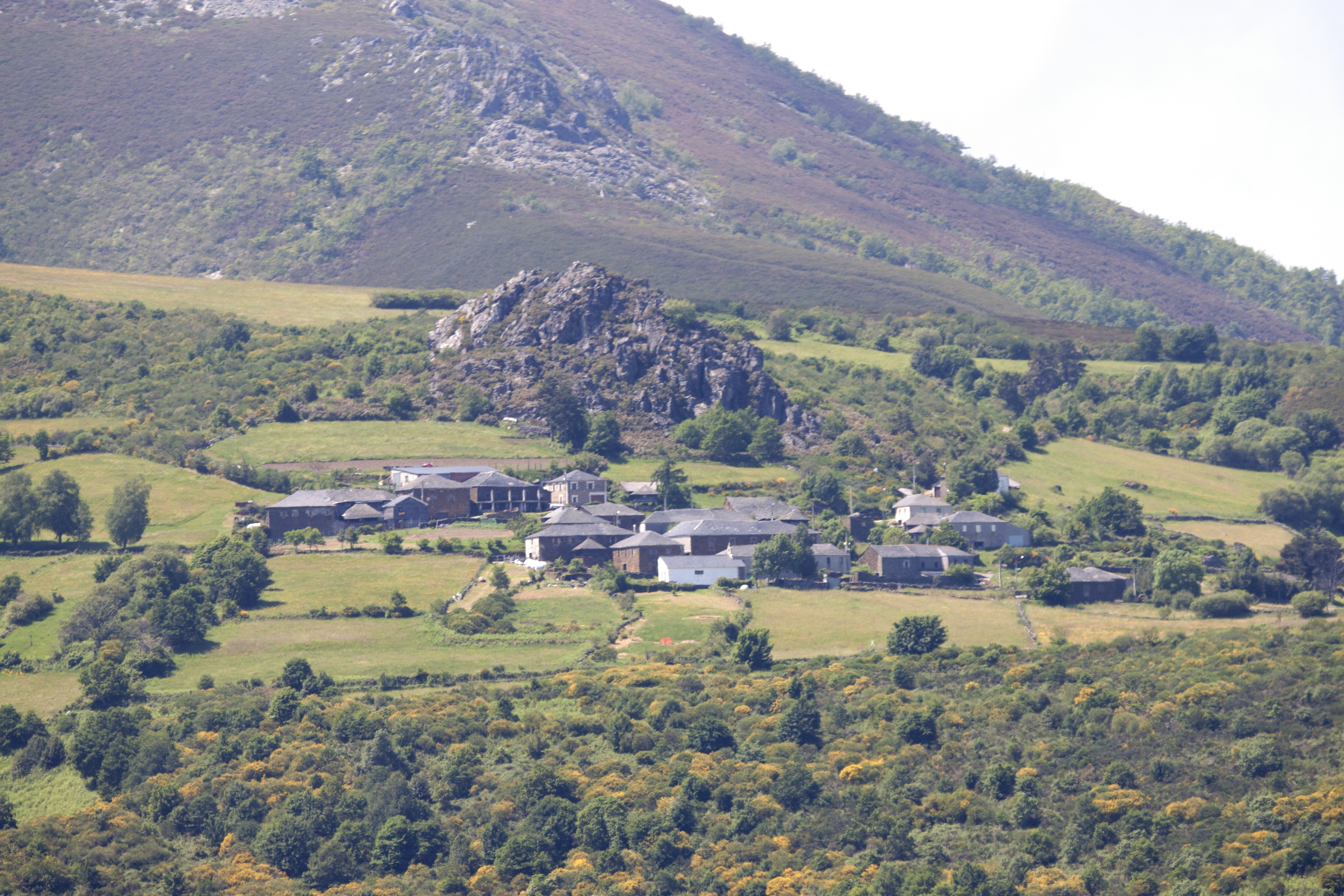

- Location within Spain
- Coordinates: 42°58′N 6°50′W
- Country: Spain
- Autonomous community: Asturias
- Province: Asturias
- Municipality: Ibias

Population (2014)
  - Total: 6

Pelliceira (Asturian, Piliceira) is one of eleven parishes (administrative divisions) in the municipality of Ibias, within the province and autonomous community of Asturias, in northern Spain. The population in 2014 was six inhabitants and the area is 18.54 square kilometres (7.16 sq mi).

== Villages and hamlets ==
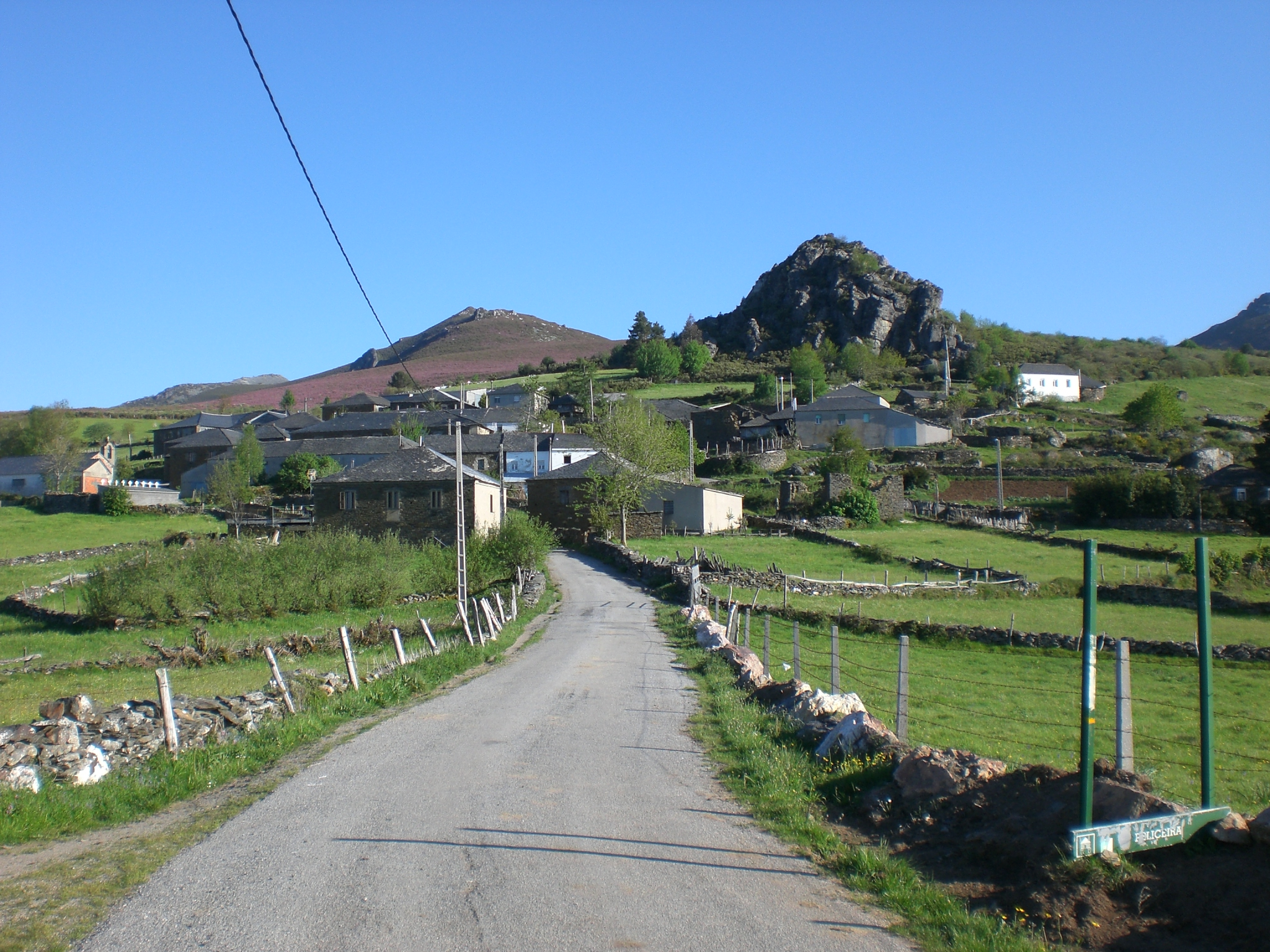
Pelliceira

- Arandojo (Arandoxo)
- Pelliceira
