= Seroiro =

- Parish
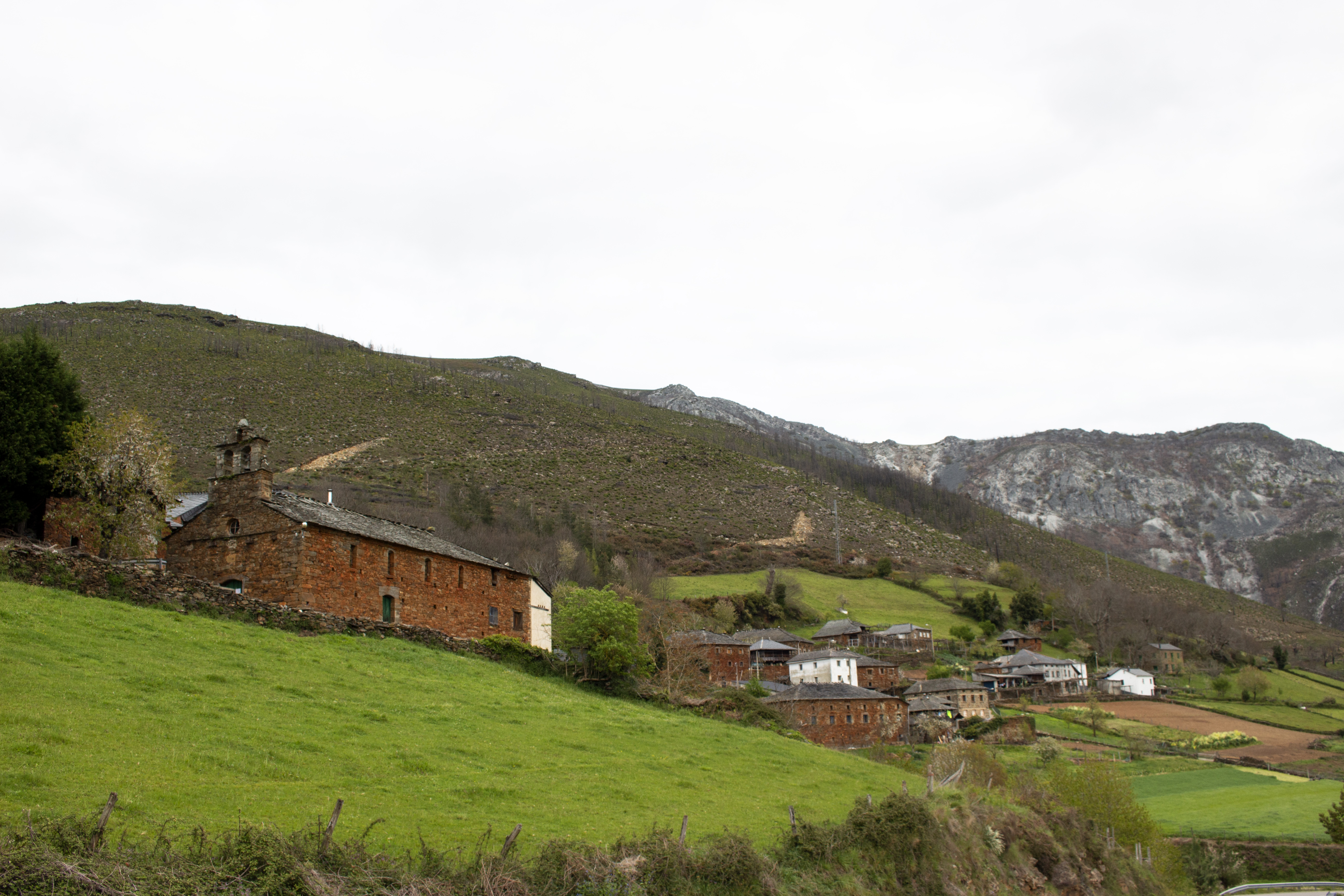

- Location within Spain
- Coordinates: 43°4′N 6°49′W
- Country: Spain
- Autonomous community: Asturias
- Province: Asturias
- Municipality: Ibias

Seroiro is one of eleven parishes (administrative divisions) in the municipality of Ibias, within the province and autonomous community of Asturias, in northern Spain. In 2020, it had 113 inhabitants.

== Villages and hamlets ==
Official name	Population (2020)		
Official name	Total	Men	Women
Andeo	14	9	5
Dou	11	5	6
Folgueiras de Aviouga	0	0	0
Morentán	7	4	3
Pradías	14	9	5
Seroiro	30	16	14
Uría	17	8	9
Valdebueyes	8	6	2
Valvaler	12	7	5
