= San Antolín (Ibias) =

- Parish
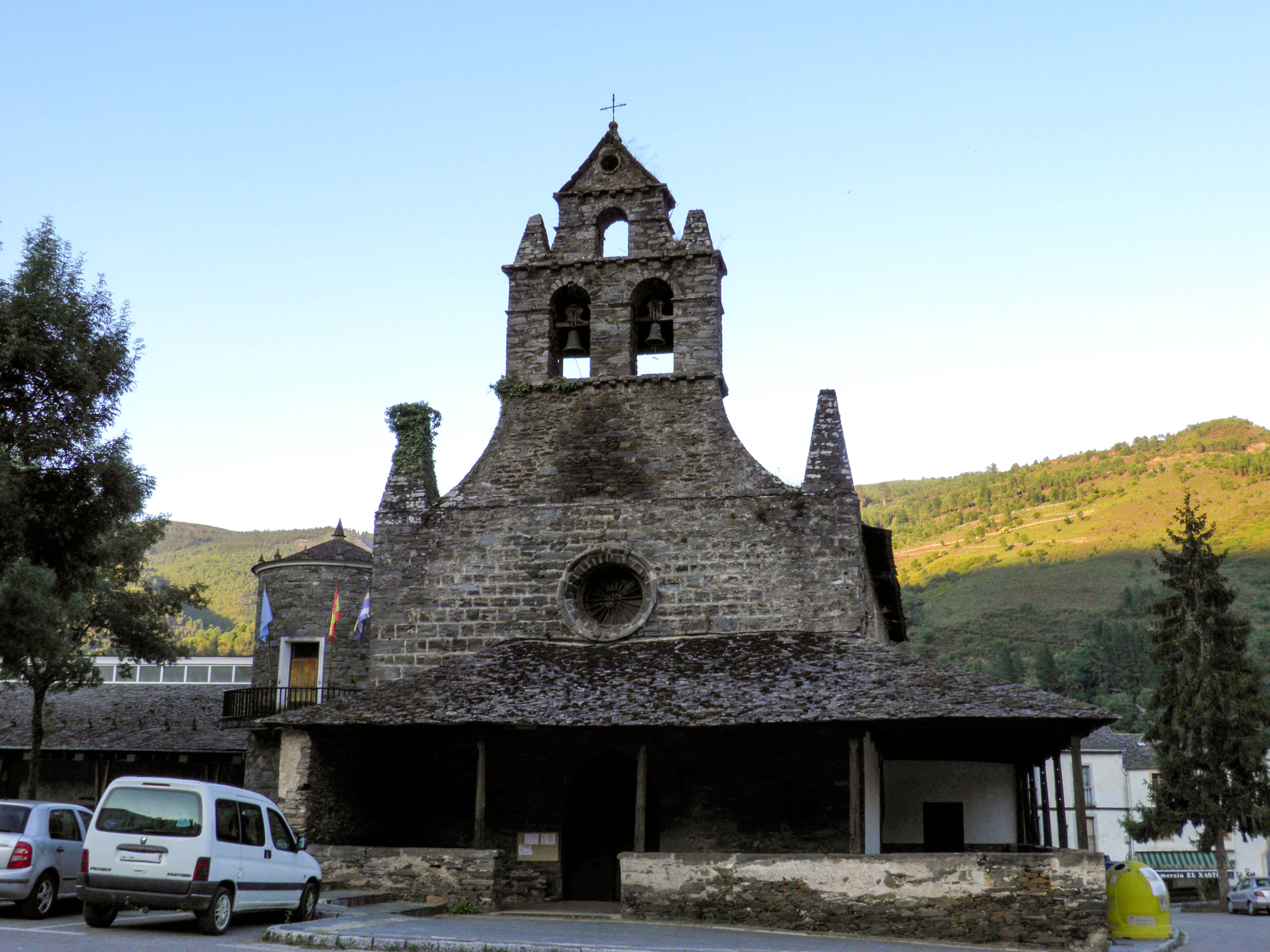

- Location within Spain
- Coordinates: 43°2′N 6°52′W
- Country: Spain
- Autonomous community: Asturias
- Province: Asturias
- Municipality: Ibias

San Antolín is one of eleven parishes (administrative divisions) in the municipality of Ibias, within the province and autonomous community of Asturias, in northern Spain. In 2020, it had 314 inhabitants.

== Villages and hamlets ==
Official name	Population (2020)		
Official name	Total	Men	Women
Caldevilla	10	6	4
Cuantas	23	11	12
Ferreira	17	11	6
Linares	20	14	6
Montillo	10	8	2
Peneda	4	3	1
Piñeira	17	10	7
San Antolín	208	111	97
