= Degaña (parish) =

- Parish
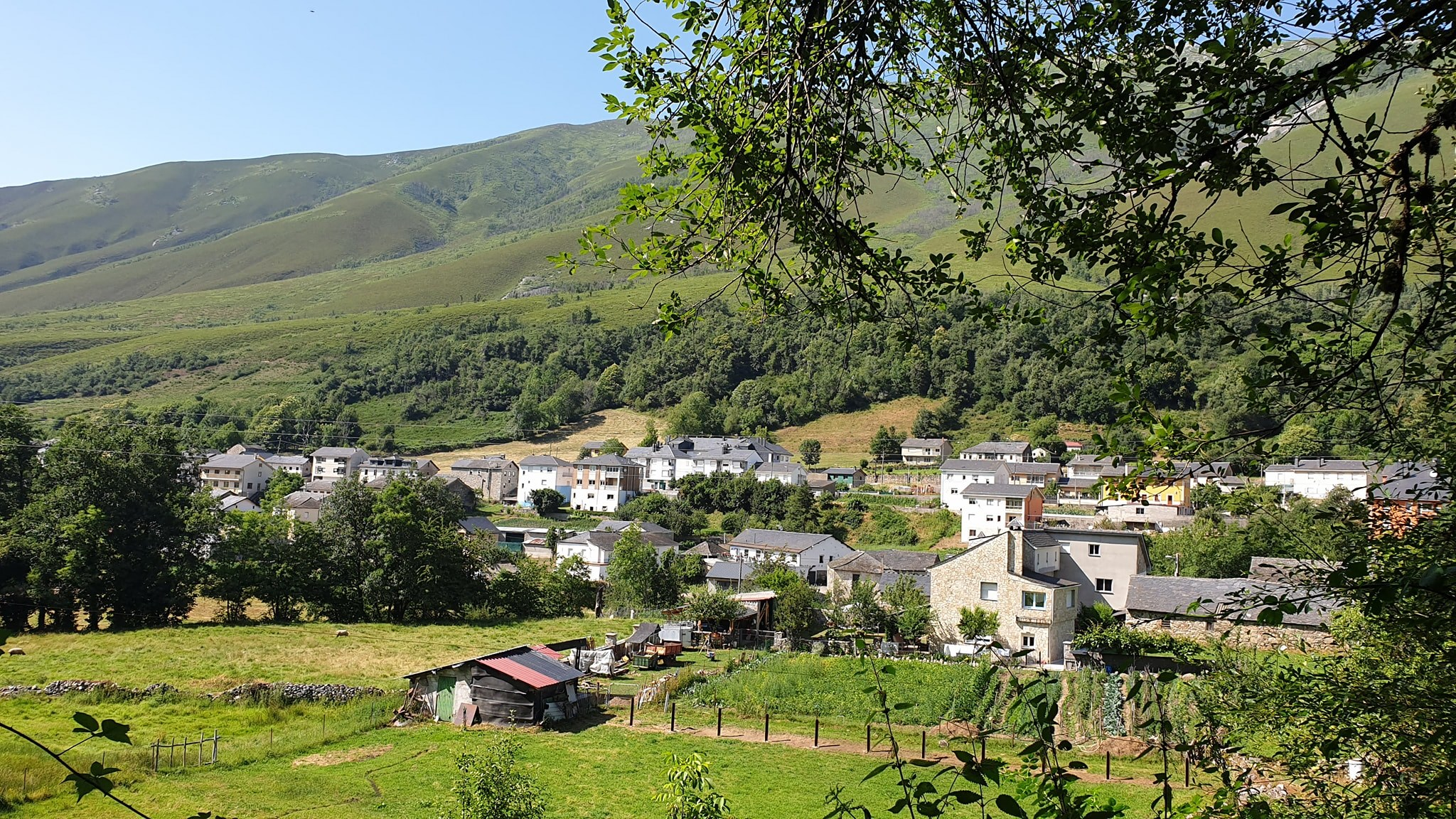

- Location within Spain
- Country: Spain
- Autonomous community: Asturias
- Province: Asturias
- Municipality: Degaña

Degaña is one of three parishes (administrative divisions) in the Degaña municipality, within the province and autonomous community of Asturias, in northern Spain.

The population is 388 (INE 2007).

== Villages ==
- Degaña
- Fonduveigas
- El Reboḷḷal
