= Villanueva (Teverga) =

Coordinates: 43.15°N 6.133333°W

Villanueva is one of thirteen parishes (administrative divisions) in Teverga, a municipality within the province and autonomous community of Asturias, in northern Spain. It is within the outskirts of the Natural Park of Fuentes del Narcea, Degaña, and Ibias.

It is 31.37 km^{2} (12.11 sq mi) in size, with a population of 224 (INE 2006). The postal code is 33111.

== Villages and hamlets ==
- Campos
- La Torre
- Quintanal
- Vigidel (Vixidel)
- Villanueva
