= Sena (Ibias) =

- Parish
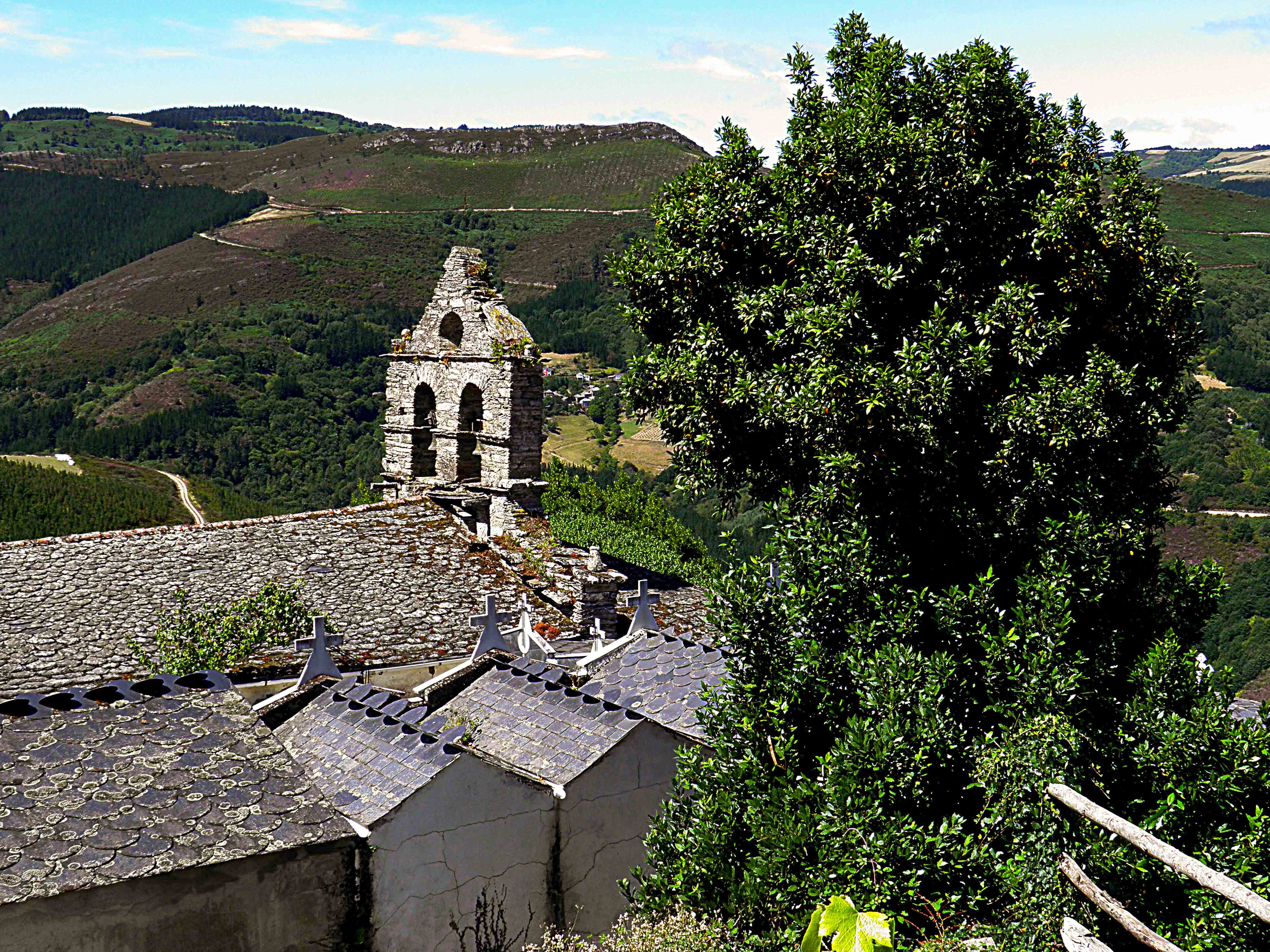

- Location within Spain
- Coordinates: 43°3′N 6°57′W
- Country: Spain
- Autonomous community: Asturias
- Province: Asturias
- Municipality: Ibias

Sena is one of eleven parishes (administrative divisions) in the municipality of Ibias, within the province and autonomous community of Asturias, in northern Spain. In 2020, it had 77 inhabitants. In the 1849 geographical dictionary published by Pascual Madoz, it is described as follows:

SENA (San Agustín): parish in prov. and dioc. of Oviedo (23 leag.), juridical part of the Grandas de Salime (7), council of Ibias (3): situated to the W. of the prov. and limits Lugo, in the r. bord. of the r. Navia, with free airflow and a healthy climate. It has 88 houses in the villages of Barca, Balda, Bustelin, Busto, Arejo, Castavia, Fornaza, Gabianceira, Jeneda, Linares, Penedela, Rioporcos, Ribera, Salvador and San Tirso. The parr. church (San Agustin) is served by a curate and laic patrons. Confined to the N. border by Ouviñão; E. San Antolin; S. Sta. Comba, and O. Castañedo. The land is mountainous and rugged, and is bathed by some streams which end in the aforementioned r. Navia. Prod.: wheat, corn, barley, acorns, potatoes, legumes, grass: cows are raised, and also pigs, sheep and goats; hunting and fishing of various kinds. pop.: 88 h., 440 souls.

== Villages and hamlets ==
Official name	Population (2020)		
Official name	Total	Men	Women
Barca	3	2	1
Bustelín	0	0	0
Castaosa	12	6	6
Penedela	0	0	0
Riodeporcos	12	6	6
Salvador	7	5	2
Santiso	14	11	3
Sena	29	10	19
