= Os Coutos =

- Parish
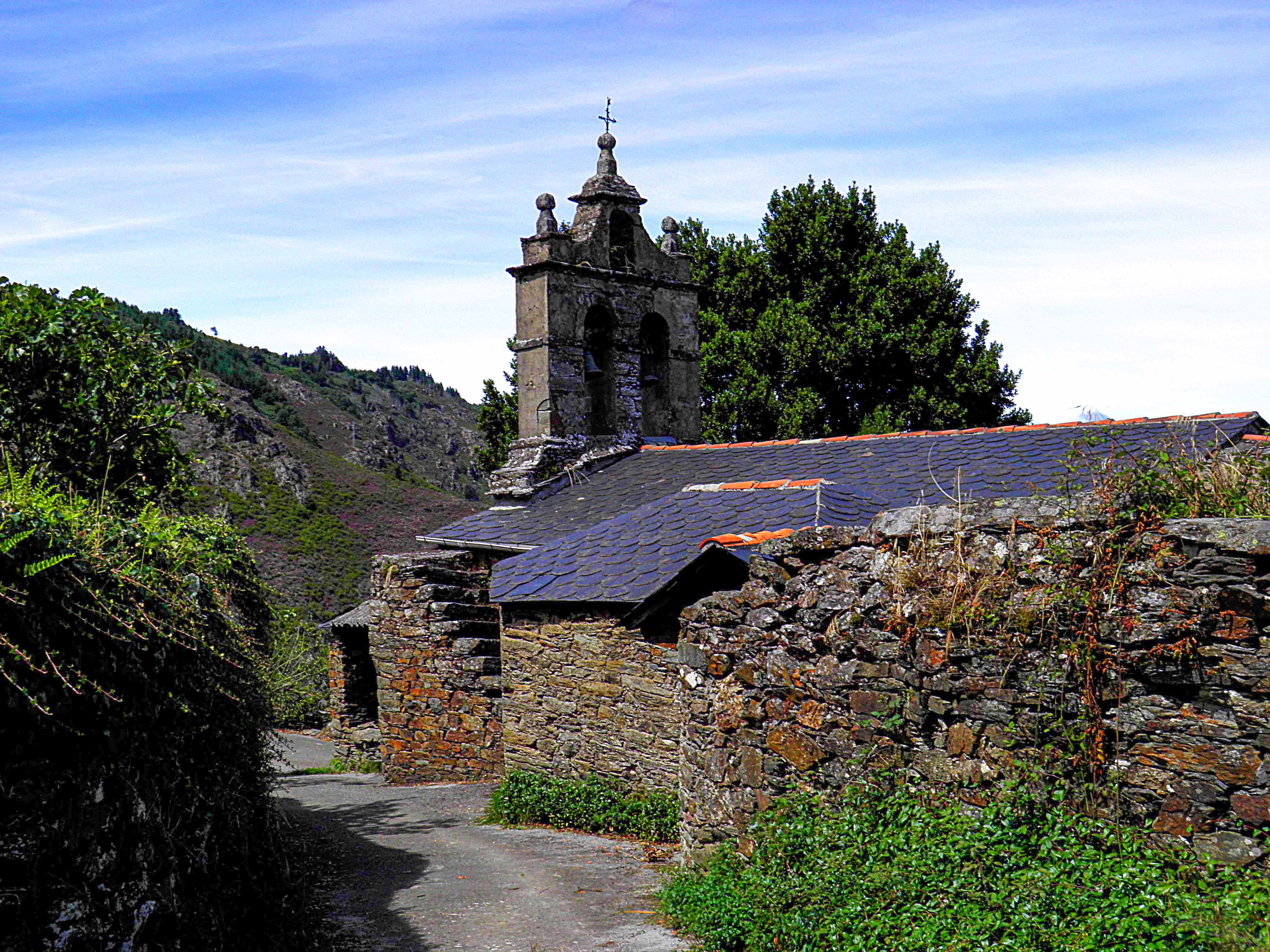

- Location within Spain
- Coordinates: 43°1′N 6°58′W
- Country: Spain
- Autonomous community: Asturias
- Province: Asturias
- Municipality: Ibias

Os Coutos is one of eleven parishes (administrative divisions) in the Preserves is a parish council Ibias, the westernmost of it. Bordered on the west by Galicia (Navia), and joins the rest of the parish council by Sena. It has an oceanic climate with cold winters and hot dry summers. Dominated by chestnut and pine. There is much big game, because in the mountain there are many wild boar and deer. Although there are plenty of foxes and yew, and it is believed that there are wolves in the traces found. There is also trout fishing in the Navia River, which borders the neighboring community of Galicia. In recent years, the parish suffered a significant drop in the number of inhabitants, as the average age is high.

== Villages and hamlets ==
- Folgueiras dos Coutos
- A Legúa
- A Muria
- Parada
- Santa Comba dos Coutos
- Valdeferreiros
- Vilarello
- Vilaselande
- O Viñal
