= San Clemente (Ibias) =

- Parish
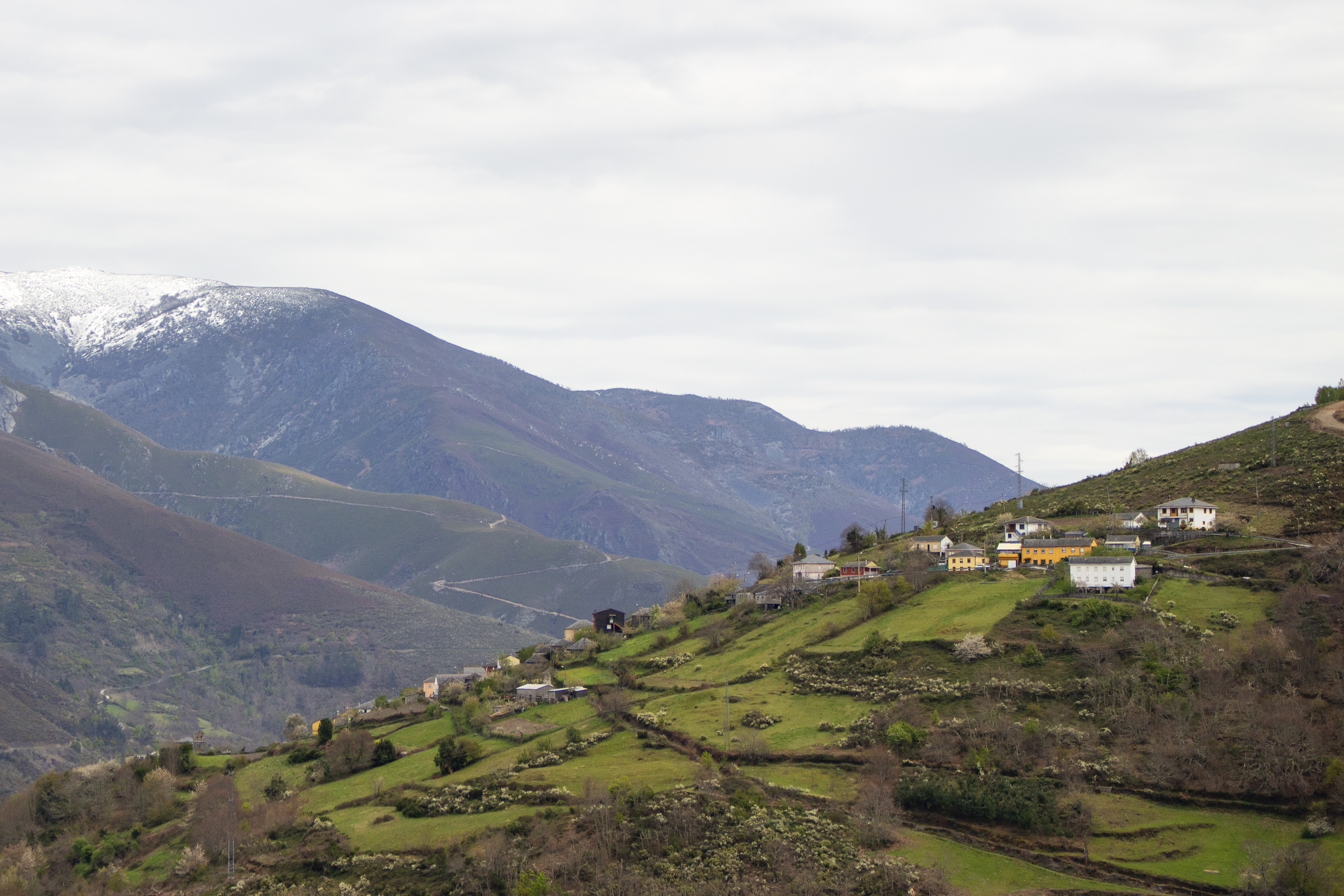

- Location within Spain
- Coordinates: 42°59′N 6°49′W
- Country: Spain
- Autonomous community: Asturias
- Province: Asturias
- Municipality: Ibias

San Clemente is one of eleven parishes (administrative divisions) in the municipality of Ibias, within the province and autonomous community of Asturias, in northern Spain. In 2023, it had 61 registered inhabitants, down from 64 in 2020.

== Villages and hamlets ==
Official name	Population (2020)		
Official name	Total	Men	Women
Alguerdo	9	7	2
Busante	11	7	4
Omente	13	8	5
San Clemente	22	12	10
Santa Comba	0	0	0
La Sierra	9	5	4
