= Marentes =

- Parish
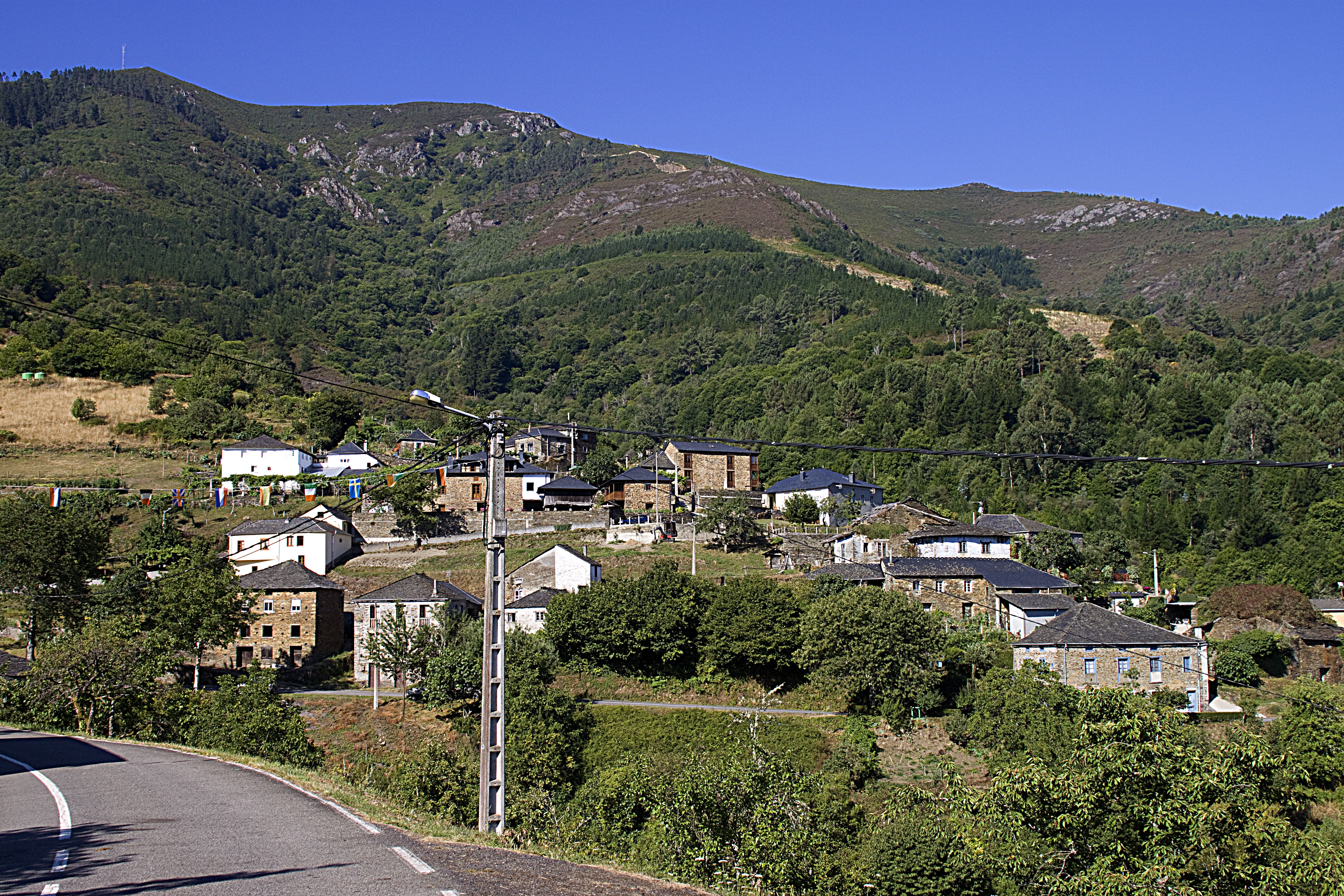

- Location within Spain
- Coordinates: 43°5′N 6°54′W
- Country: Spain
- Autonomous community: Asturias
- Province: Asturias
- Municipality: Ibias

Marentes is one of eleven parishes in the municipality of Ibias, within the province and autonomous community of Asturias, in northern Spain. In 2020, it had a population of 51, down from 66 in 2011.

== Villages and hamlets ==
Official name	Population		
Official name	Total	Men	Women
Busto	6	3	3
Marcellana	5	3	2
Marentes	30	16	14
Villajane	10	7	3
