= Sisterna =

- Parish
- Location within Spain
- Coordinates: 42°57′N 6°40′W
- Country: Spain
- Autonomous community: Asturias
- Province: Asturias
- Municipality: Ibias

Population
  - Total: 19

Sisterna is one of eleven parishes in the municipality of Ibias, within the province and autonomous community of Asturias, in northern Spain. In 2021 it had 19 inhabitants, down from 48 in 2000.

== Villages and hamlets ==
- Bao Population 2011 16
- Sisterna Population 2011 16

== Economy ==
Traditionally, the zone has relied on woodworking, utilizing lathes. During winter, men would exert this activity to later sell their goods in markets throughout Spain. The women were left in charge of the villages when the man were busy with trade.

This particular economic tradition might be responsible for Sisterna's geographic organization. Usually Asturian villages are made up with houses spread far apart from each other, with land for animals and orchards, besides a hórreo (granary). In Sisterna, however, the houses are all put together forming narrow streets (including the church), something which might be a consequence from the fact that the inhabitants lived not so much from agriculture and cattle-raising than from industry and commerce.

Nowadays in Sisterna there is a rural hub for the artisans, with lodging, a store and an ethnographical museum dedicated to the woodworkers, called "tixileiros" in Asturian.
