= Ibias =

- Municipality
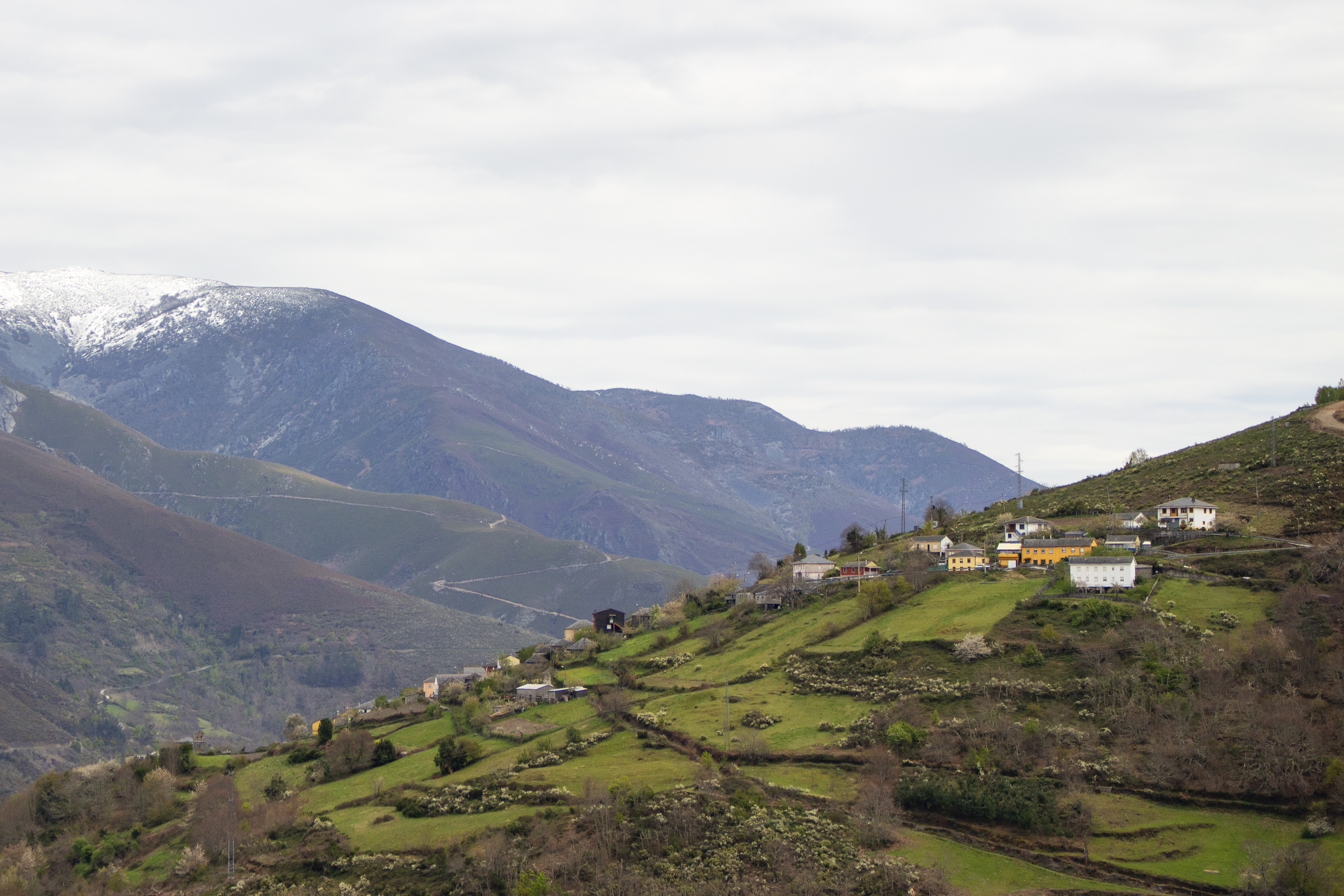
- Parish of San Clemente, Ibias

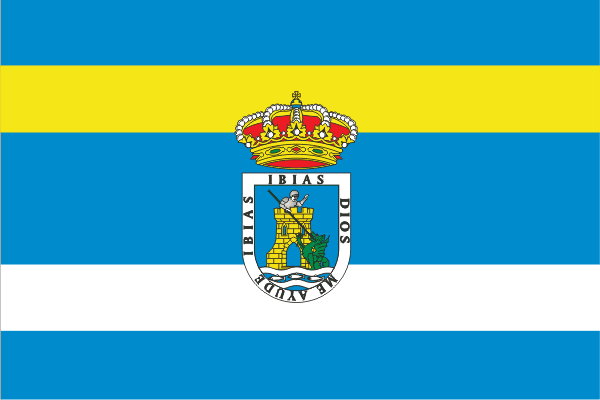
- Flag Coat of arms

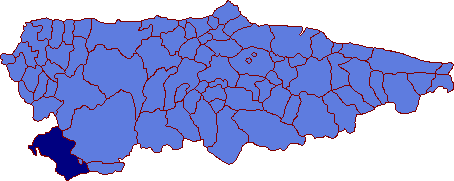

- Location in Spain
- Coordinates: 43°2′N 6°52′W
- Country: Spain
- Autonomous community: Asturias
- Province: Asturias
- Comarca: Narcea
- Judicial district: Cangas de Narcea
- Capital: San Antolín de Ibias

Government
  - Mayor: Gemma Alvarez

Area
  - Total: 333.41 km^{2} (128.73 sq mi)
- Highest elevation: 1,961 m (6,434 ft)

Population (2025-01-01)
  - Total: 1,084
  - Density: 3.251/km^{2} (8.421/sq mi)
- Demonym: ibiense
- Time zone: UTC+1 (CET)
  - Summer (DST): UTC+2 (CEST)
- Postal code: 33810
- Official language(s): Spanish
- Website: Official website

Ibias is a municipality in the autonomous community of Asturias in Spain. It has 1084 inhabitants. It shares its name with the river Ibias, which flows through the municipality. Its capital and largest parish is San Antolín; it is also composed of the parishes Cecos, Marentes, Os Coutos, Pelliceira, San Clemente, Sena, Seroiro, Sisterna, Taladrid, and Tormaleo. Ibias is located in the Central Massif of the Cantabrian Mountains, and contains within it a section of the Fuentes del Narcea, Degaña e Ibias Natural Park.

== History ==
The first verifiable written mentions of Ibias were recorded in the 11th century, where it was referred to as "Ibi" and "Ibia." In the 14th century, a legal dispute between the members of the ruling House of Ibias and their subjects, who sought recognition of their rights, was resolved in favor of the House. Four centuries later, after complaints due to abuses of power, the House had much of its territory seized, and Ibias lost some of its area. Furthermore, in 1836, the region of Degaña split off into a separate municipality, further shrinking Ibias. Historically, Ibias is also known for its torneiros, skilled craftsman who fabricated and sold fine wooden utensils throughout Spain.

In the 20th century, the parish of San Antolín went from tenth to first in terms of population in the municipality after the discovery of anthracite deposits in nearby Tormaleo; around this time, the coal mining industry became the major economic driver in the region. Since the mid-20th century, however, Ibias has suffered a major population decline as a result of the closure of its mines and emigration due to urbanization. As a result, Ibias has become the target of multiple initiatives funded by the Ministry of Environment aiming to revitalize the regional economy through the promotion of ecotourism.

== Demographics ==
Historical population

Year	Pop.	±%
1842	8,031	—
1857	7,500	−6.6%
1877	6,618	−11.8%
1887	6,808	+2.9%
1900	7,287	+7.0%
1910	7,700	+5.7%
1920	8,161	+6.0%
1930	8,672	+6.3%
1940	6,765	−22.0%

Year	Pop.	±%
1950	5,866	−13.3%
1960	5,803	−1.1%
1970	4,232	−27.1%
1981	3,081	−27.2%
1991	2,502	−18.8%
2001	2,082	−16.8%
2011	1,635	−21.5%
2021	1,184	−27.6%

Source: INE

== See also ==
- List of municipalities in Asturias
