= Páramo (Teverga) =

Páramo (Parmu) is one of thirteen parishes (administrative divisions) in Teverga, a municipality within the province and autonomous community of Asturias, in northern Spain.

It is 14.81 km^{2} (5.72 sq mi) in size, with a population of 112 (INE 2006). The postal code is 33111.

== Villages and hamlets ==
- Páramo
- Villa de Sub (La Villa) (43.1°N 6.033333°W)
