= Villamayor (Teverga) =

Coordinates: 43.183333°N 6.133333°W

Villamayor (Viḷḷamayor) is one of thirteen parishes (administrative divisions) in Teverga, a municipality within the province and autonomous community of Asturias, in northern Spain. It is within the outskirts of the Natural Park of Les Ubiñes-La Mesa.

Situated at 840 m (2,760 ft) above sea level, it is 8.02 km^{2} (3.10 sq mi) in size, with a population of 58 (INE 2019). The postal code is 33111.

== Villages and hamlets ==
- Riomayor (Rimayor)
- Villamayor
