= Trabáu =

Coordinates: 42°58′N 6°39′W

- Parish
- Interactive map of Trabáu
- Country: Spain
- Autonomous community: Asturias
- Province: Asturias
- Municipality: Degaña

Population (2015)
  - Total: 32

Trabáu is one of three parishes (administrative divisions) in the Degaña municipality, within the province and autonomous community of Asturias, in northern Spain.

As of 2015 the population was 32.
