= La Foceicha =

Coordinates: 43.099353°N 6.058875°W

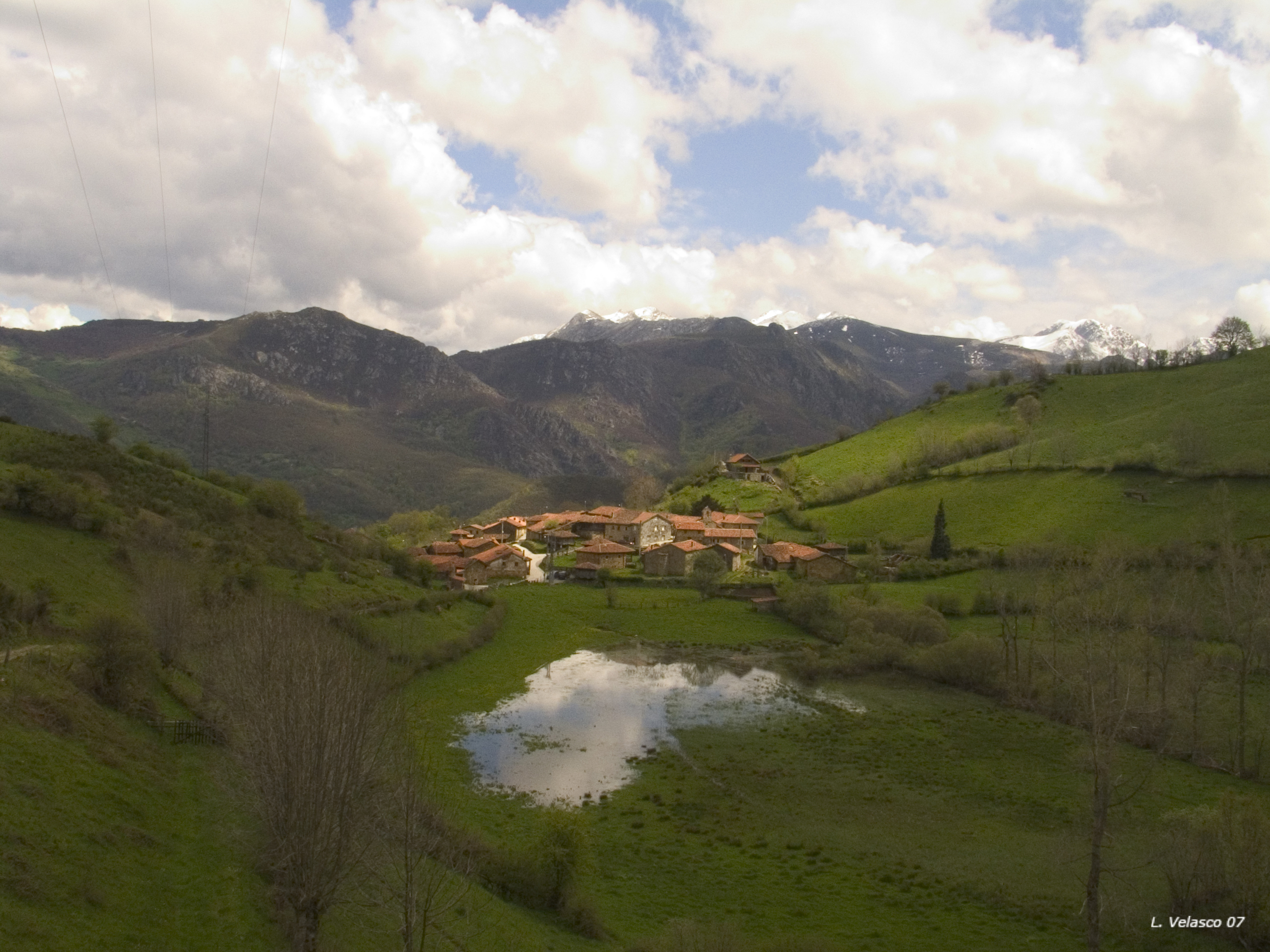
View of La Focella.

La Foceicha is one of thirteen parishes (administrative divisions) in Teverga, a municipality within the province and autonomous community of Asturias, in northern Spain.

Situated at 1,040 m (3,410 ft) above sea level, it is 23.84 km^{2} (9.20 sq mi) in size, with a population of 16 (INE 2006). The postal code is 33111.
