= Rieḷḷu =

Parish in Asturias, Spain

Rieḷḷu (Asturian pronunciation: [ˈrjet͡ʂu]) (Spanish:Riello) is one of thirteen parishes (administrative divisions) in Teverga, a municipality within the province and autonomous community of Asturias, in northern Spain.

Situated at 510 m (1,670 ft) above sea level, it is 5.89 km^{2} (2.27 sq mi) in size, with a population of 129 (INE 2006). The postal code is 33111.

== Villages and hamlets ==
- La Barrera
- Berrueñu (43.15°N 6.066667°W)
- Cuañana
- Montecieḷḷu
- Rieḷḷu
- Las Veigas
