= Zarréu =

- Parish
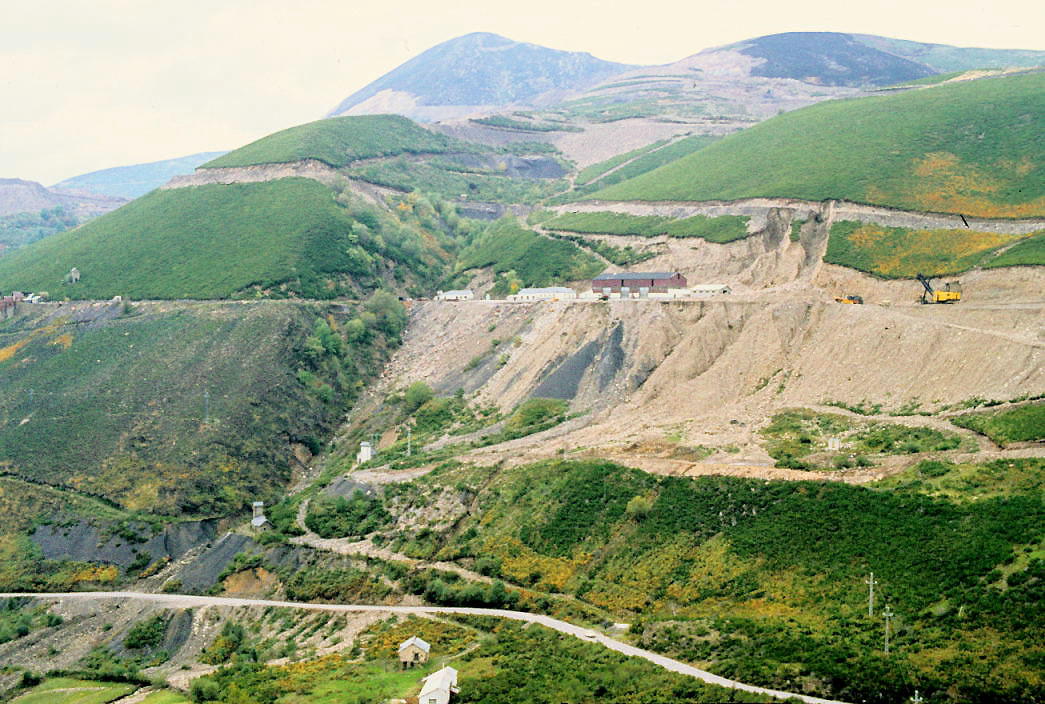
- Former mines of Zarréu

- Location within Spain
- Coordinates: 42°57′N 6°2′W
- Country: Spain
- Autonomous community: Asturias
- Province: Asturias
- Municipality: Degaña

Zarréu is one of three parishes (administrative divisions) in the Degaña municipality, within the province and autonomous community of Asturias, in northern Spain.

The population is 867 (INE 2007).

== Villages ==
- Pruída
- Zarréu
