= Ibias (river) =

River in Spain

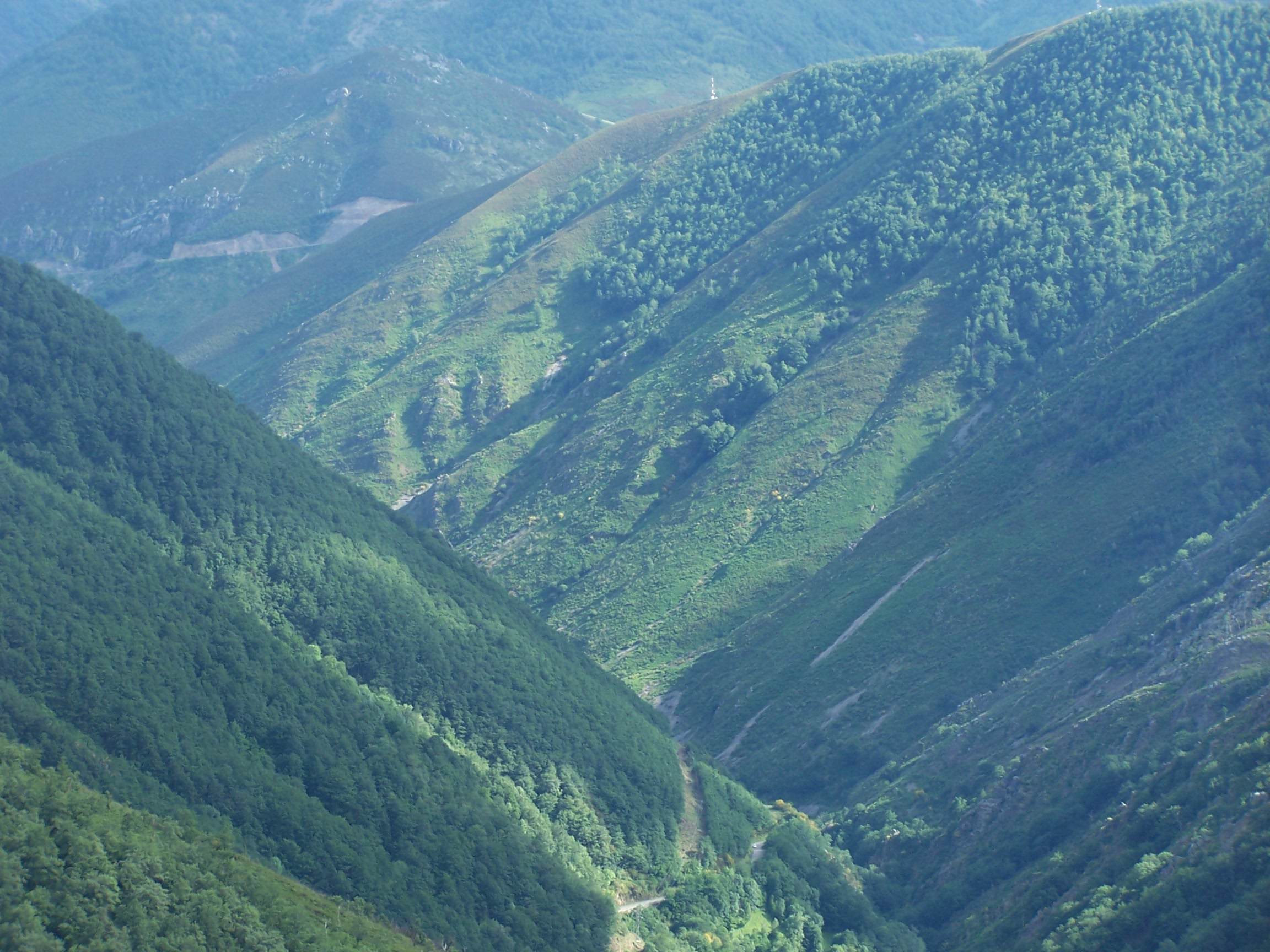

Location
- Country: Spain
- State: Asturias; Galicia
- Region: Ibias

Physical characteristics
- Source
  - location: Natural Park of Fuentes del Narcea, Degaña, and Ibias
  - elevation: 1,600 m (5,200 ft)
- Mouth
  - location: Navia River
  - coordinates: 43°5′45″N 6°54′43″W
  - elevation: 231 m (758 ft)
- Length: 45 km (28 mi)

The Ibias is a river in northern Spain flowing from the Autonomous Community of Asturias into Galicia.

== See also ==
- Rivers of Galicia
