= San Salvador d'Alesga =

San Salvador d'Alesga is one of thirteen parishes (administrative divisions) in Teverga, a municipality within the province and autonomous community of Asturias, in northern Spain. The Castillo de Alesga is located in San Salvador d'Alesga.

It is 5.08 km^{2} (1.96 sq mi) in size, with a population of 97 (INE 2006). The postal code is 33111.

== Villages and hamlets ==
- Fresnedo (Fresnéu) (43.116667°N 6.066667°W)
- San Salvador
