= La Plaza =

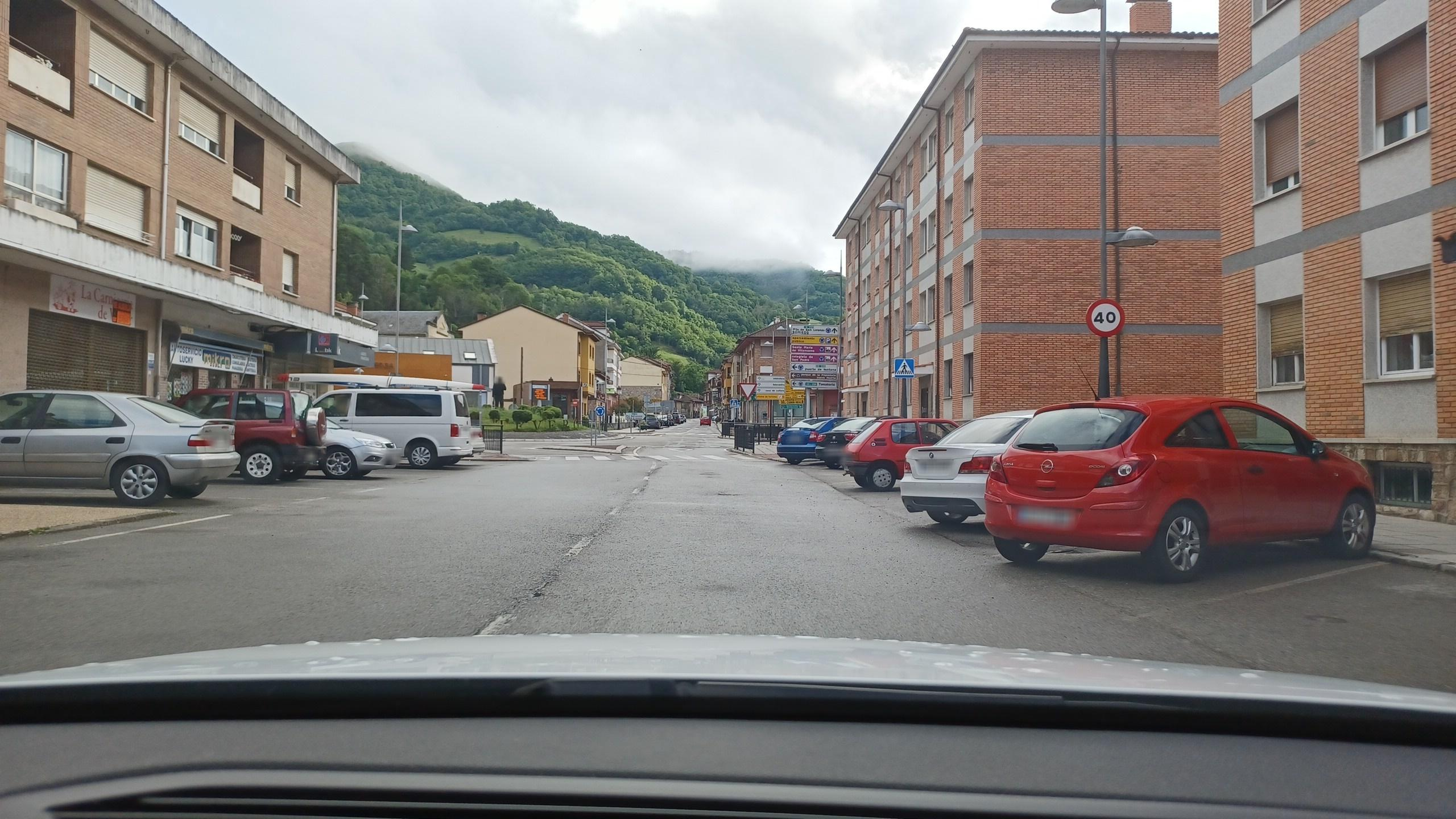
Village of San Martín, in La Plaza parish

La Plaza is one of thirteen parishes (administrative divisions) in Teverga, a municipality within the province and autonomous community of Asturias, in northern Spain.

It is 9.13 km^{2} (3.53 sq mi) in size, with a population of 836 (INE 2006). The postal code is 33111.

== Villages and hamlets ==
- Cansinos
- Entrago (Entragu) (43.166667°N 6.083333°W)
- La Favorita
- La Obra
- Las Garbas
- Llamas
- Redral
- San Martín (Samartín) (43.166667°N 6.083333°W)
- Villabonel (Villaunel)
- Villar (Vil.lar)
