= Tormaleo =

- Parish
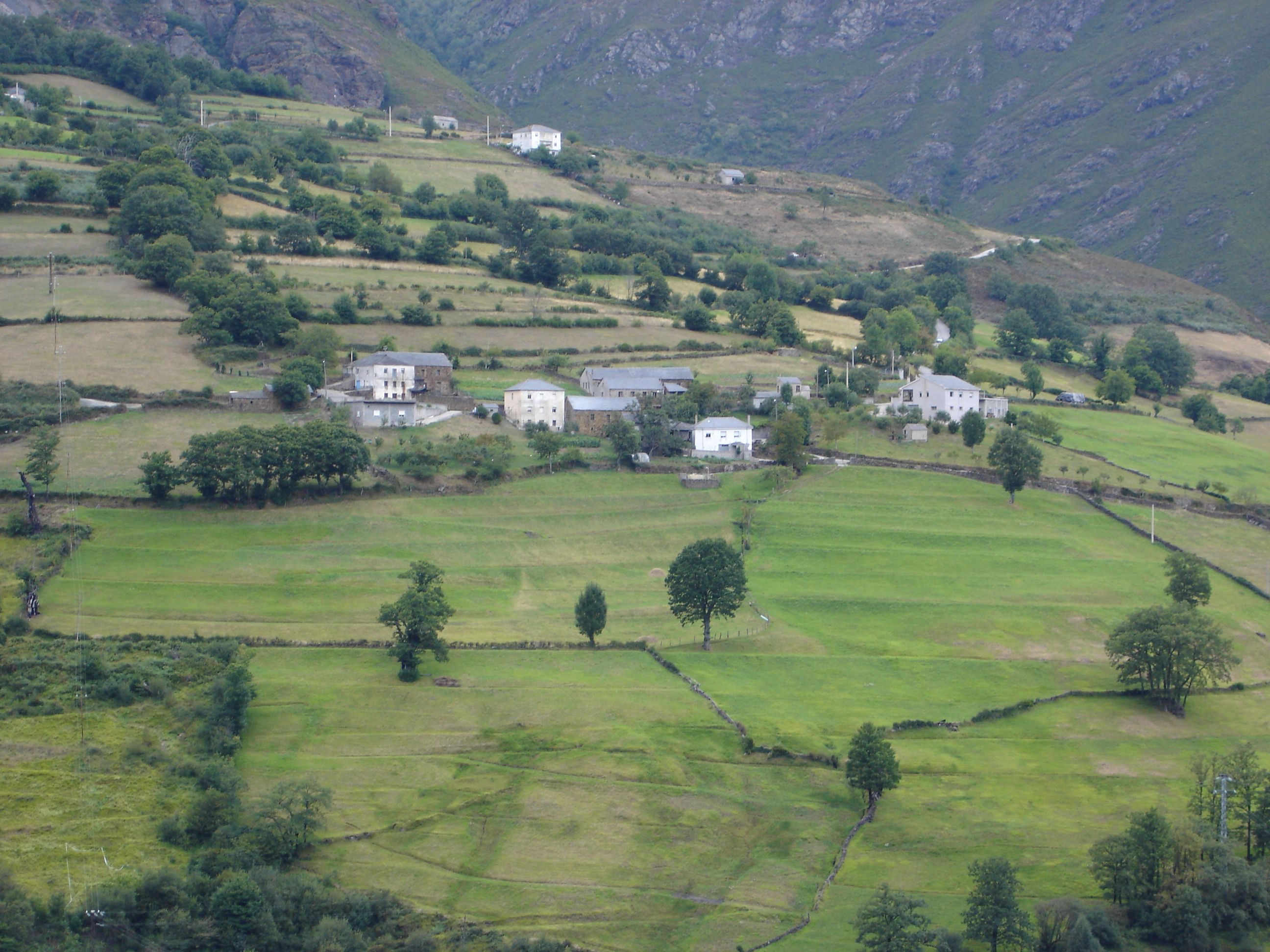

- Location within Spain
- Coordinates: 42°56′N 6°45′W
- Country: Spain
- Autonomous community: Asturias
- Province: Asturias
- Municipality: Ibias

Population (2011)
  - Total: 423

Tormaleo is one of eleven parishes in the municipality of Ibias, within the province and autonomous community of Asturias, in northern Spain. In 2020, it had 305 inhabitants. There is a palace in the village built mostly in the 18th century from an earlier medieval base in a great state of disrepair.

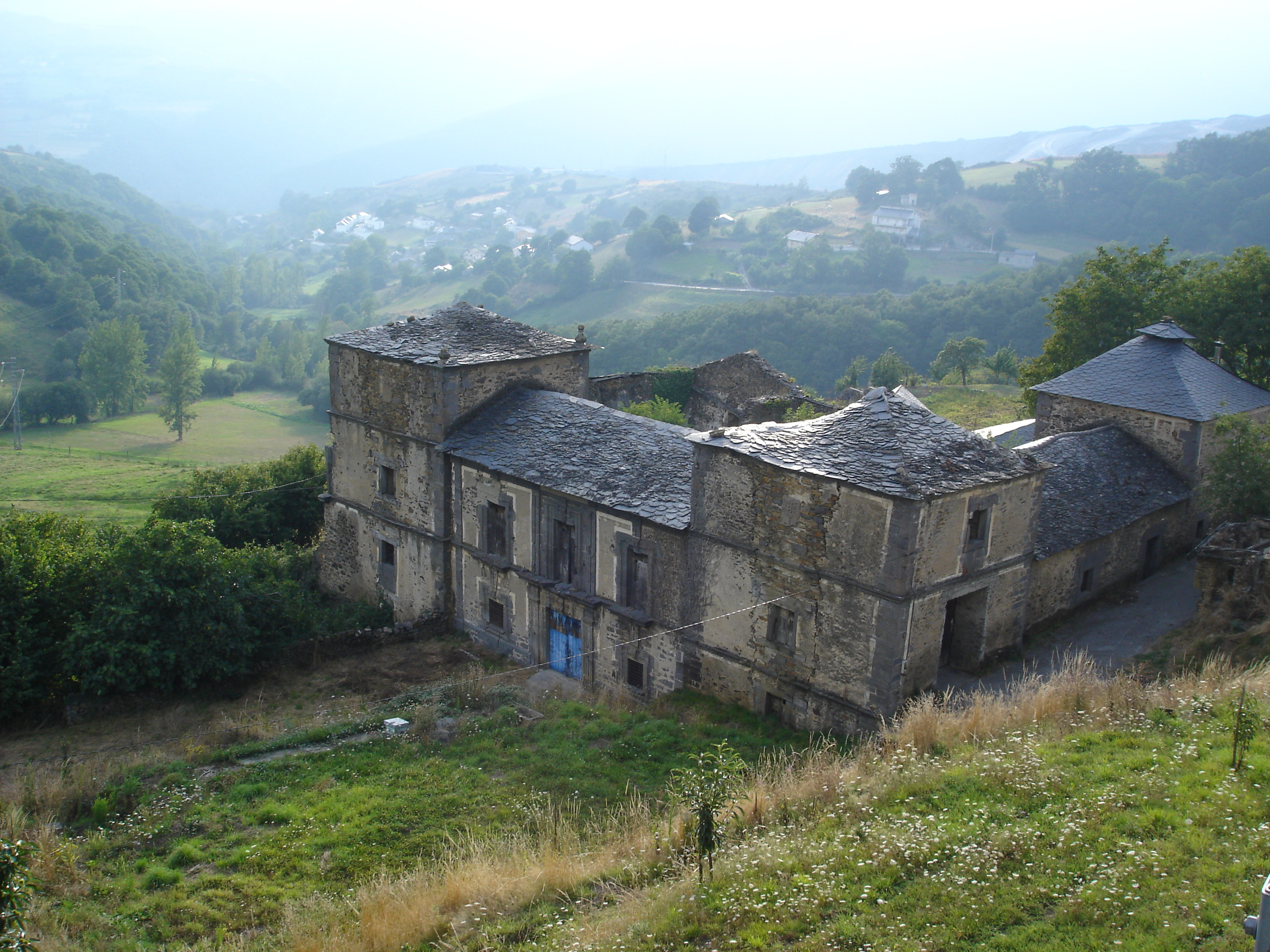
The Tormaleo palace in 2007

== Villages and hamlets ==
The villages and hamlets of Tormaleo are as follows:

Official name	Population (2020)		
Official name	Total	Men	Women
Buso	25	14	11
Fondodevilla	61	38	23
Fresno	7	5	2
Luiña	64	32	32
Torga	15	10	5
Tormaleo	32	17	15
Villares de Abajo	87	50	37
Villares de Arriba	14	6	8
