= Barrio (Teverga) =

Parish in Northern Spain

Barrio (Barriu) is one of thirteen parishes (administrative divisions) in Teverga, a municipality within the province and autonomous community of Asturias, in northern Spain.

It covers a land area of15.72 km^{2} (6.07 sq mi), with a population of 40 (INE 2006). The postal code is 33111.

== Villages and hamlets ==
- Barrio
- Cuña (43.116667°N 6.1°W)
