= Santianes =

Parish of Teverga, Asturias, Spain

Santianes is one of thirteen parishes (administrative divisions) in Teverga, a municipality within the province and autonomous community of Asturias, in northern Spain.

It is 22.83 km^{2} (8.81 sq mi) in size, with a population of 283 (INE 2006). The postal code is 33111.

== Villages and hamlets ==
- Bárzana (43.166667°N 6.1°W)
- Campiello (Campiellu)
- Castro (Castru)
- Cuarteles
- Gradura (43.183333°N 6.1°W)
- Hedrada (Drada)
- Infiesta
- Medión
- Murias
- Prado (Prau) (43.183333°N 6.1°W)
- Santianes
