= Teverga =

- Municipality
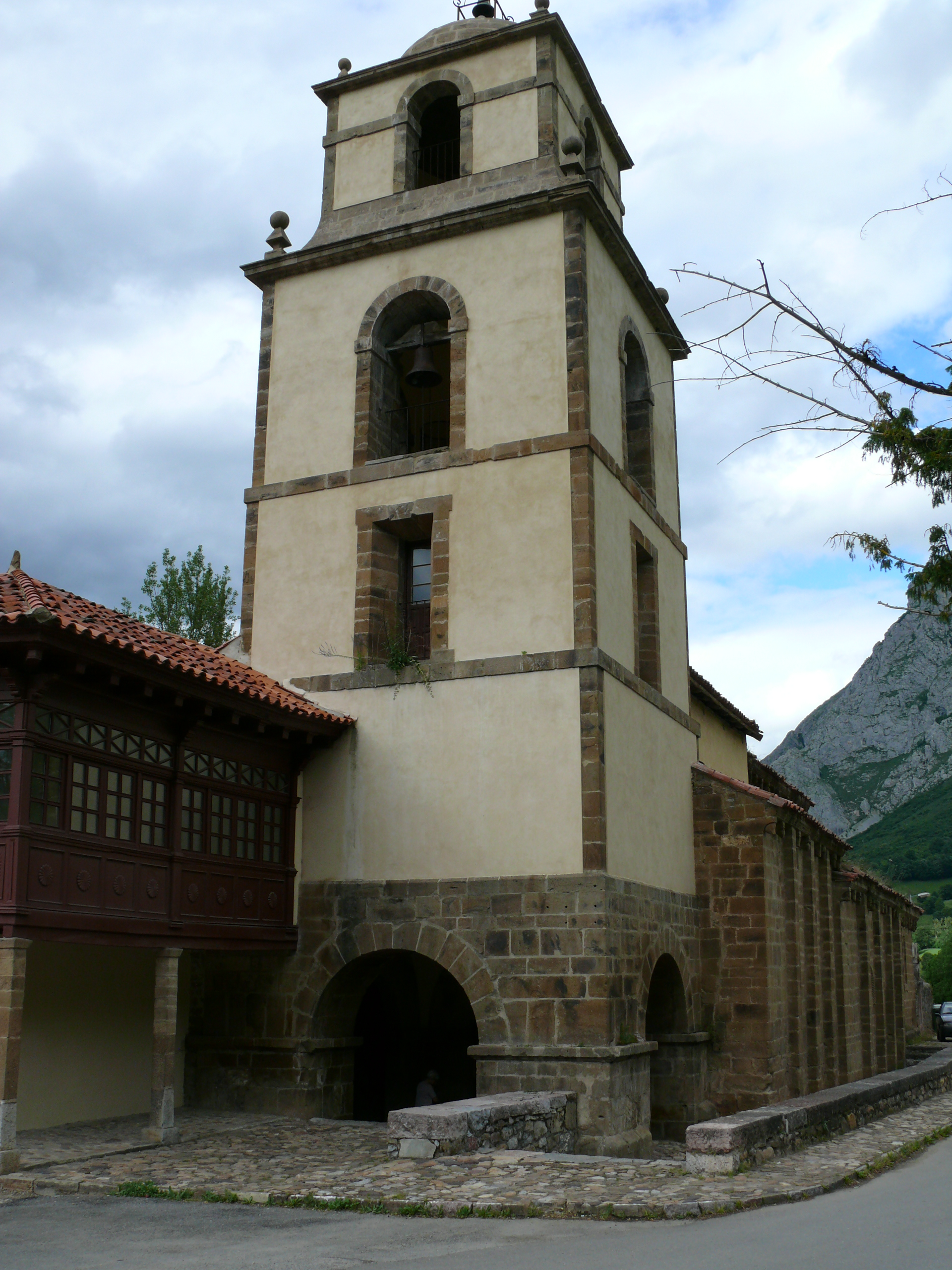
- Church of San Pedro

- Flag Coat of arms

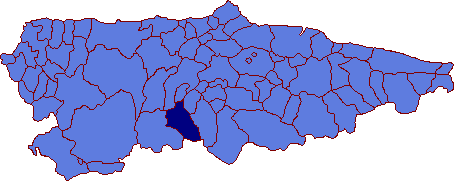

- Location in Spain
- Coordinates: 43°9′N 6°6′W
- Country: Spain
- Autonomous community: Asturias
- Province: Asturias
- Comarca: Oviedo
- Judicial district: Grado
- Capital: La Plaza

Government
  - Alcalde: María Carmen Fernández Alonso (PSOE)

Area
  - Total: 168.86 km^{2} (65.20 sq mi)
- Highest elevation: 1,983 m (6,506 ft)

Population (2025-01-01)
  - Total: 1,495
  - Density: 8.853/km^{2} (22.93/sq mi)
- Demonym: Tevergano
- Time zone: UTC+1 (CET)
  - Summer (DST): UTC+2 (CEST)
- Postal code: 33111
- Website: Official website

Teverga (Asturian: Teberga) is a municipality in the Autonomous Community of the Principality of Asturias, Spain. It is bordered on the north by Belmonte de Miranda, Grado, Yernes y Tameza, and Proaza; to the south by León province, to the west by Somiedo and to the east by Quirós and Proaza.

Formerly a mining area, now its economy is based on agriculture and emerging tourism. The tourism is based on the area's beauty and historical interest. The peak Sobia is distinguished by its impressive vertical walls of limestone and its flat top. The collegiate church of San Pedro, in a high medieval style, dates from between 1069 and 1076. One can explore the mountains and the 12-km long Huerta Cave, the Senda del Oso bicycle path, or a museum of prehistory.

In 2013, Teverga was prized with the Exemplary Town of Asturias Award, of the Prince of Asturias Awards. Because of this recognition, Felipe, Prince of Asturias, visited the town in October 2013.

== Parishes ==
- Barrio (Barriu; Bairru)
- Carrea
- La Focella (La Fouciecha; La Foceicha)
- La Plaza
- Páramo (Parmu)
- Riello (Rieḷḷu)
- San Salvador d'Alesga
- Santianes
- Taja (Taxa)
- Torce
- Urria
- Villamayor (Viḷḷamor)
- Villanueva (Viḷḷanueva; Viḷḷanuöva)

== Politics ==
	PSOE	IT	PP	IU-BA	Otros	Total
2003	4	-	4	3	0	11
2007	4	3	1	1	0	9

== Gallery ==
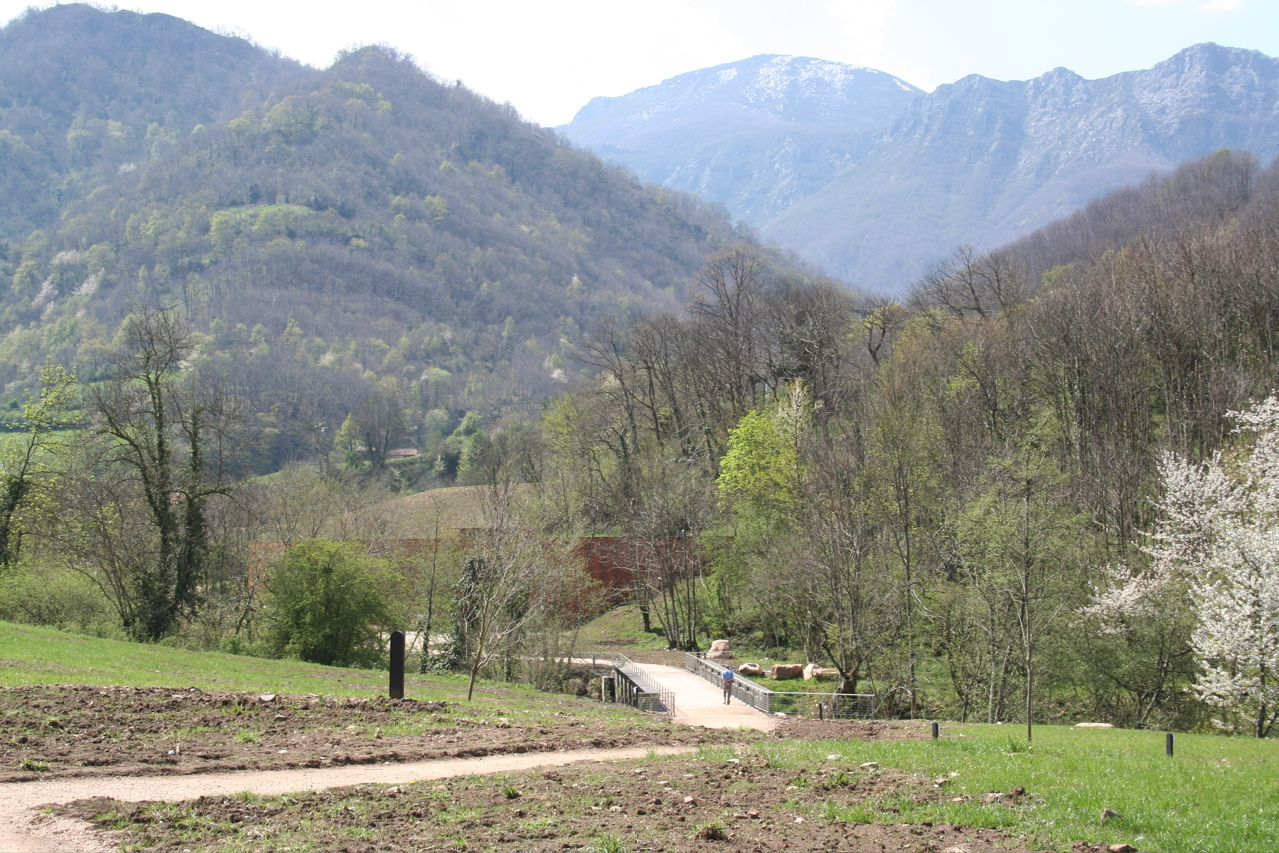
Park of Prehistory

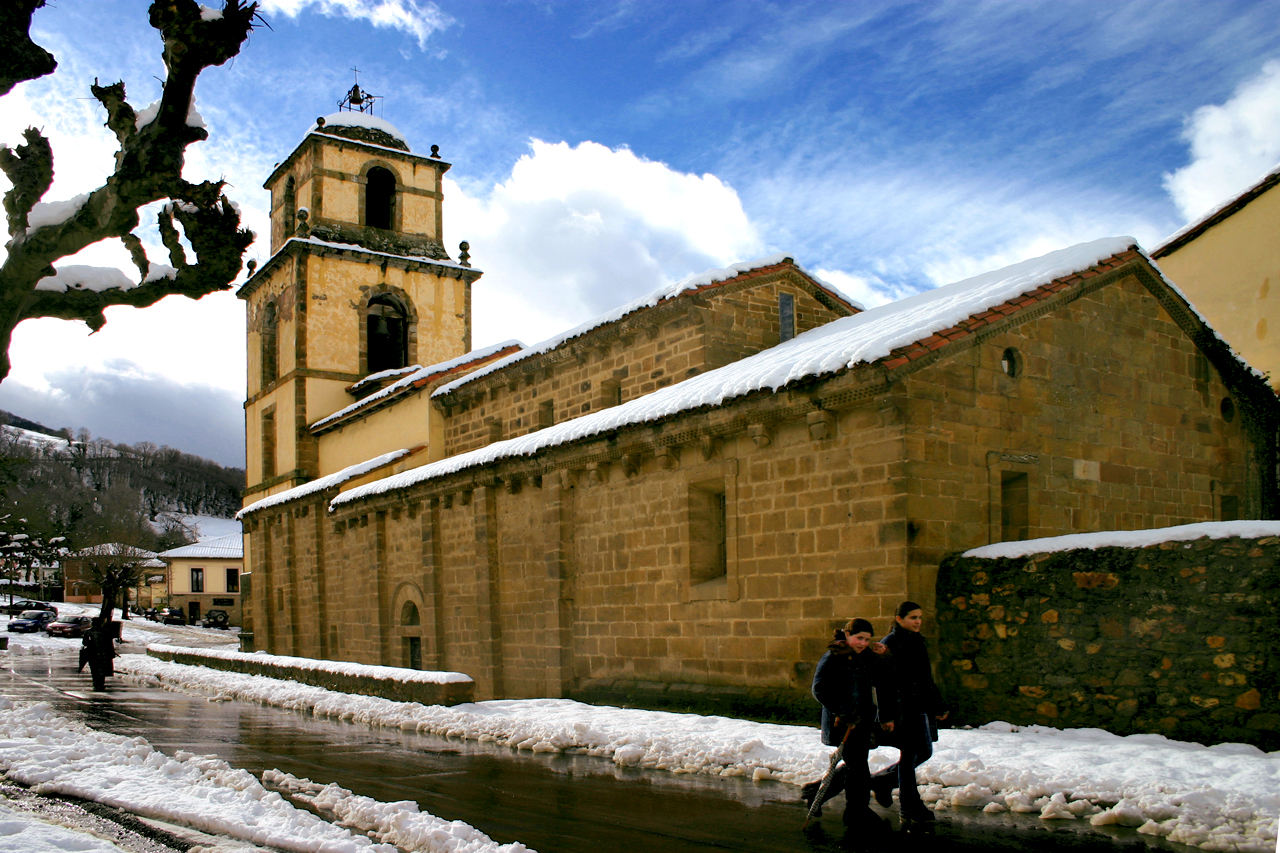
Church of San Pedro in La Plaza

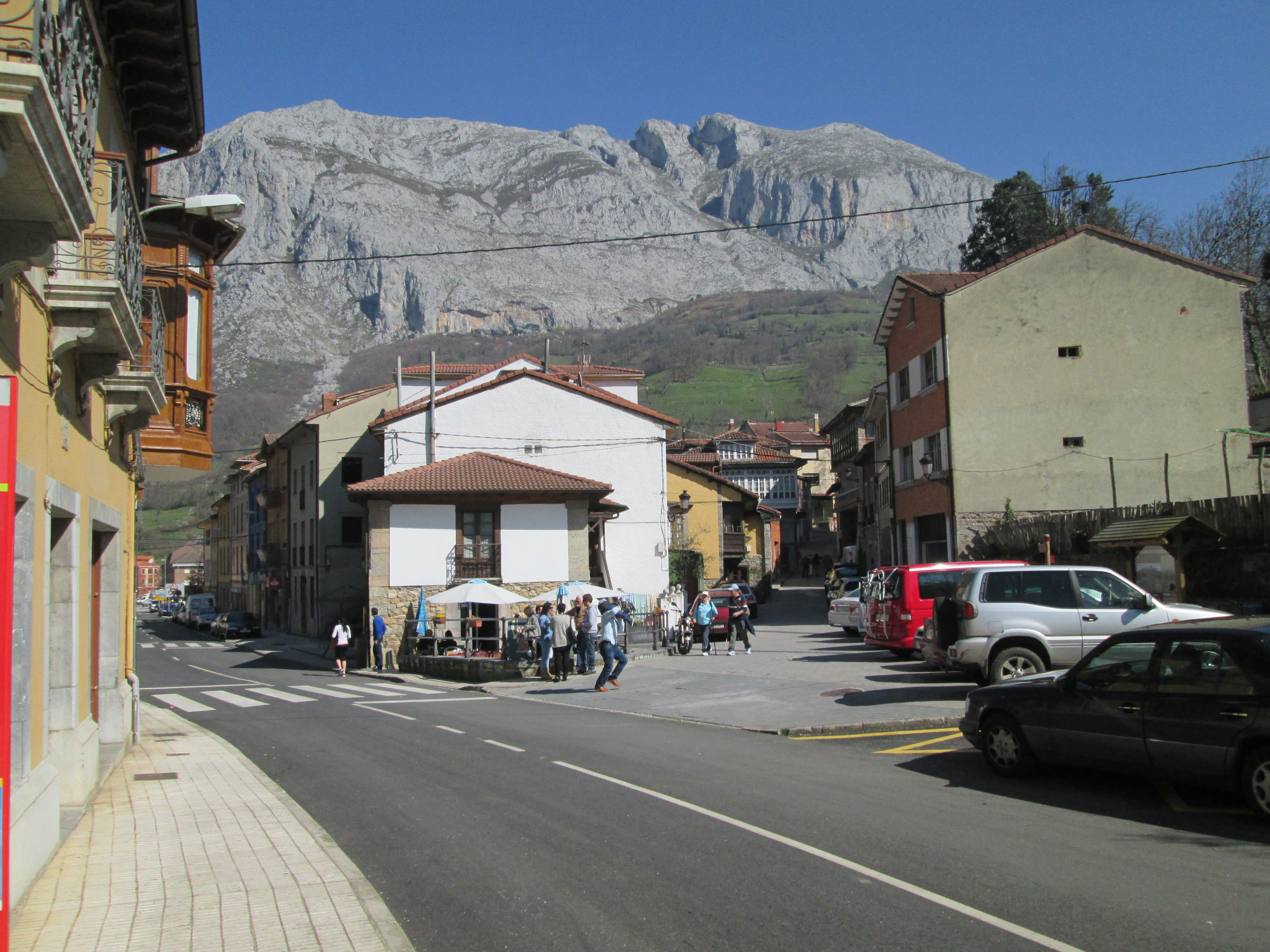
Village of San Martín, in La Plaza

== Natural wonders ==
- Caldoveiro Peak

== See also ==
- List of municipalities in Asturias
