= Fuentes del Narcea, Degaña e Ibias Natural Park =

Natural park in northern Spain

- Parque Natural de las Fuentes del Narcea, Degaña e Ibias
- IUCN category V (protected landscape/seascape)
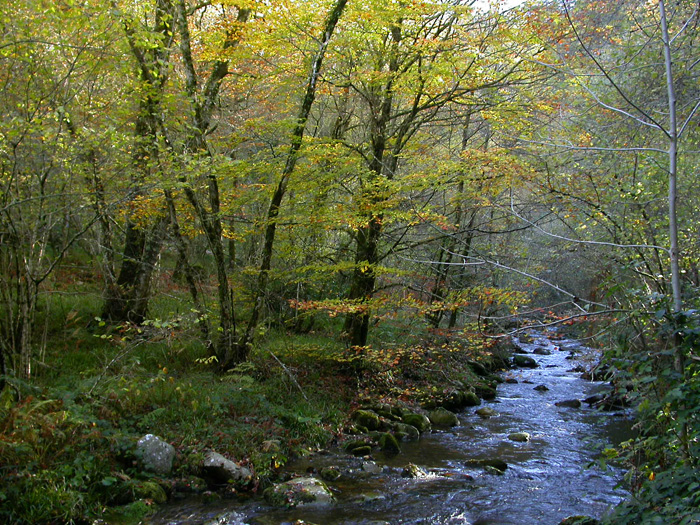
- River Muniellos
- Interactive map of Fuentes del Narcea, Degaña e Ibias Natural Park
- Location: Asturias
- Coordinates: 43°10′47.5″N 6°33′0.1″W
- Area: 47.589 ha (117.59 acres)
- Established: 2002
- Governing body: Principality of Asturias
- Website: tematico.asturias.es/mediambi/siapa/web/espacios/espacios/pnt/fuentes/

Fuentes del Narcea, Degaña e Ibias Natural Park (Spanish: Parque Natural de las Fuentes del Narcea, Degaña e Ibias) is a natural park in the Principality of Asturias in northern Spain. It protects a natural landscape at the sources of the rivers Narcea and Ibias. It is located within the municipalities of Cangas del Narcea, Degaña and Ibias. The park was designated in 2002 and incorporated the preexisting Muniellos biosphere reserve, which was extended in 2003.

== Muniellos nature reserve and Muniellos biosphere reserve ==
The heart of the natural park is the Muniellos nature reserve (area 5,488 ha), where human access is strictly controlled and where timber extraction has been forbidden since 1970. In 2000 UNESCO designated Muniellos as a biosphere reserve, the area of which was extended in 2003 to take account of the creation of the natural park. The core area of the Muniellos biosphere reserve occupies 8,661 ha with the rest of the natural park being regarded as a buffer zone.

In the early years of the twenty-first century there has discussion of how the various biosphere reserves in the Cantabrian Mountains should be managed as a single super-reserve to be known as Gran Cantábrica. This integration is expected to benefit animals which live in the mountains, such as the endangered Cantabrian brown bear which needs to extend its range in order to build a sustainable population.

== Conservation issues ==
The designation of the natural park met with some local opposition on the grounds that it was detrimental to the interests of property owners (most of the park being private property). However, a management plan for the park was approved in 2006.

Traditional agriculture is carried out in some areas of the park. Although thousands of people live in the protected area, most of the park is sparsely populated and environmental problems are mainly related to mining activity.

=== Fauna ===
Within the natural park the European Union has designated two Special Protection Areas for bird-life, a smaller one, Bosque de Muniellos (5,500 ha), and a larger one, Fuentes del Narcea y del Ibias (51,000 ha), which covers the remaining part of park. Birds of interest include the Cantabrian Capercaillie, a subspecies of the Western Capercaillie, which requires mature woodland to thrive.

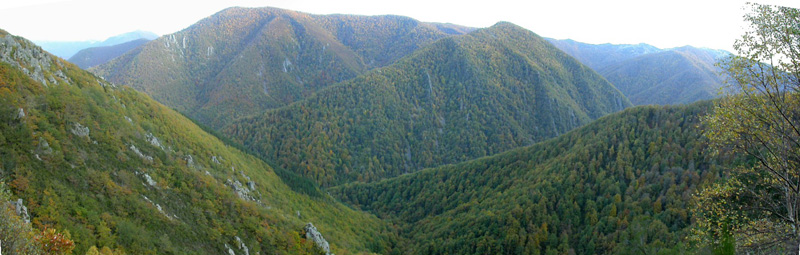
The park includes extensive woodland.

Both SPAs have also been designated as Special Areas of Conservation. The park provides a habitat for the Cantabrian brown bear.

== Places of interest ==
The following list of buildings is in the Asturian language:

- Aldega de Cecos
- Bodegues del Narcea
- Cascu hestóricu de Cangas del Narcea (Historic centre of Cangas del Narcea)
- Centru d'Enterretación de Muniellos
- Colleición Museográfica del Tixileiru
- Monasteriu de Corias: The Monastery of St John the Baptist, Corias, houses the park's interpretation centre.
- Antigu pueblu y mines d'oru romanes de El Corralín (Roman gold-mines)
- Museo Etnográficu del Vinu - Llagar de Santiso
- Palloza de San Antolín
- Pueblu de Besullu
- Pueblu de Riodeporcos
