= Degaña =

- Municipality
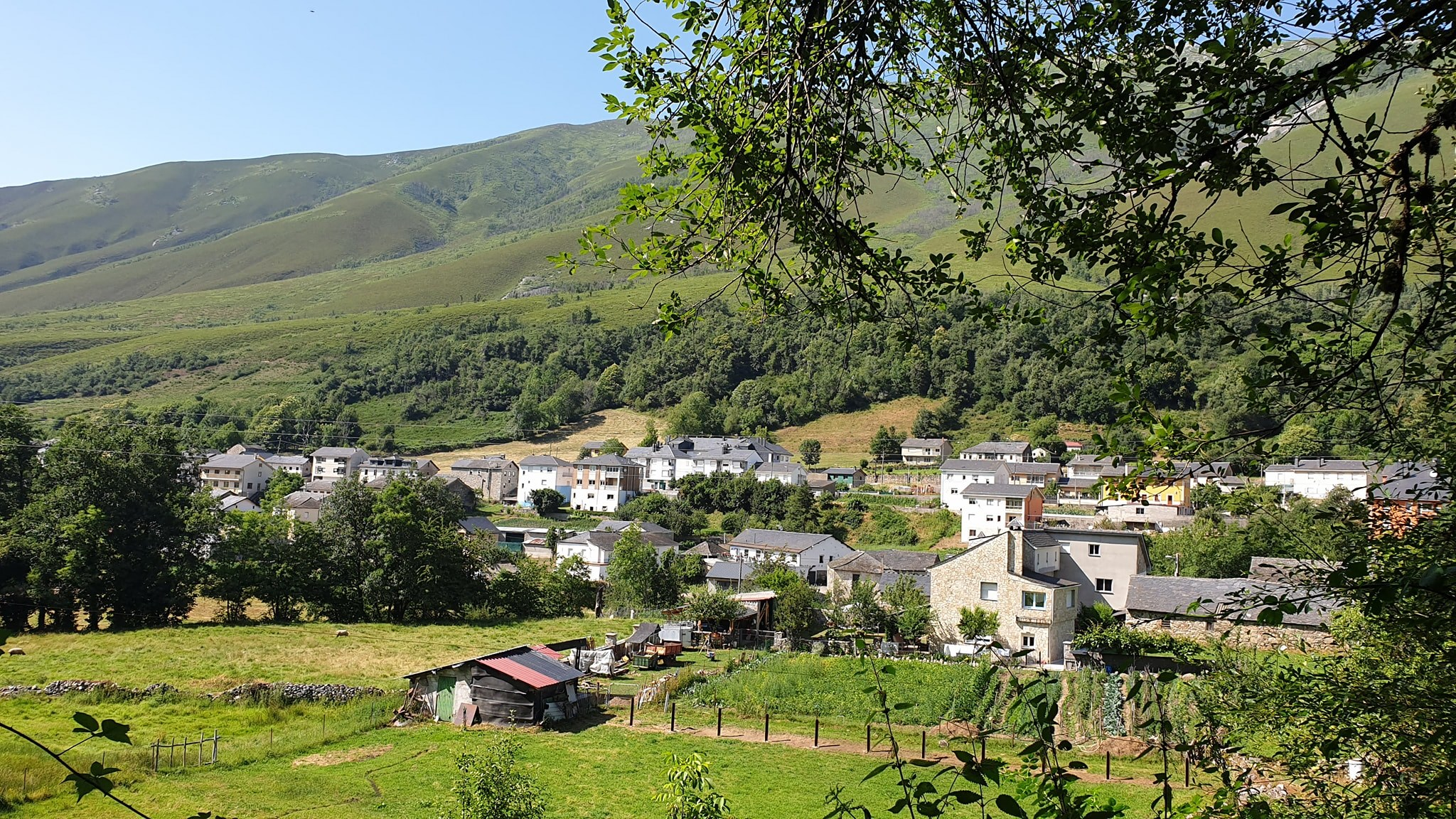
- Parish of Degaña

- Coat of arms

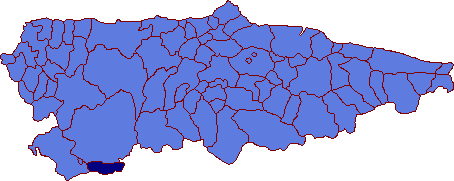

- Location in Spain
- Coordinates: 42°55′N 6°34′W
- Country: Spain
- Autonomous community: Asturias
- Province: Asturias
- Comarca: Narcea
- Judicial district: Cangas del Narcea

Government
  - Alcalde: Jaime Gareth Flórez (IU)

Area
  - Total: 87.16 km^{2} (33.65 sq mi)
- Highest elevation: 1,934 m (6,345 ft)

Population (2023)
  - Total: 805
  - Density: 9.24/km^{2} (23.9/sq mi)
- Demonym: degañés
- Time zone: UTC+1 (CET)
  - Summer (DST): UTC+2 (CEST)
- Postal code: 33812

Degaña is a municipality in the autonomous community of the Asturias, Spain. As of 2023, the population stood at 805. It is located in the Cantabrian Mountains, and bordered on the north by Cangas del Narcea, on the south by Castile and León, and on the west by Ibias. Degaña is also the name of one of the three parishes in the municipality, alongside Zarréu and Trabáu. The river Ibias runs through much of the region.

Historically, not much is known about Degaña due to its remote location and relative lack of inhabitants. The municipality split off from Ibias in 1863 and took its name from the parish of the same name, which was the largest settlement in the area at the time. During the Spanish Civil War, the Popular Front recorded victories in the area. Post-war, the multiple bituminous coal deposits found in the area allowed coal mining to become the most notable industry in the region; as a consequence, Zarréu overtook Degaña as the most populous parish.

Following the closure of many of the mines in the region, Degaña suffered a major population decline, shrinking by almost 50 percent since 1996. In an attempt to correct the dire situation, the Spanish Ministry of Environment invested in a plan that would promote ecotourism and counterurbanization in Degaña and Ibias in order to stimulate economic growth in the struggling regions in 2023.

== See also ==
- List of municipalities in Asturias
