= Braña =

Seasonal pasture of north-west Spain

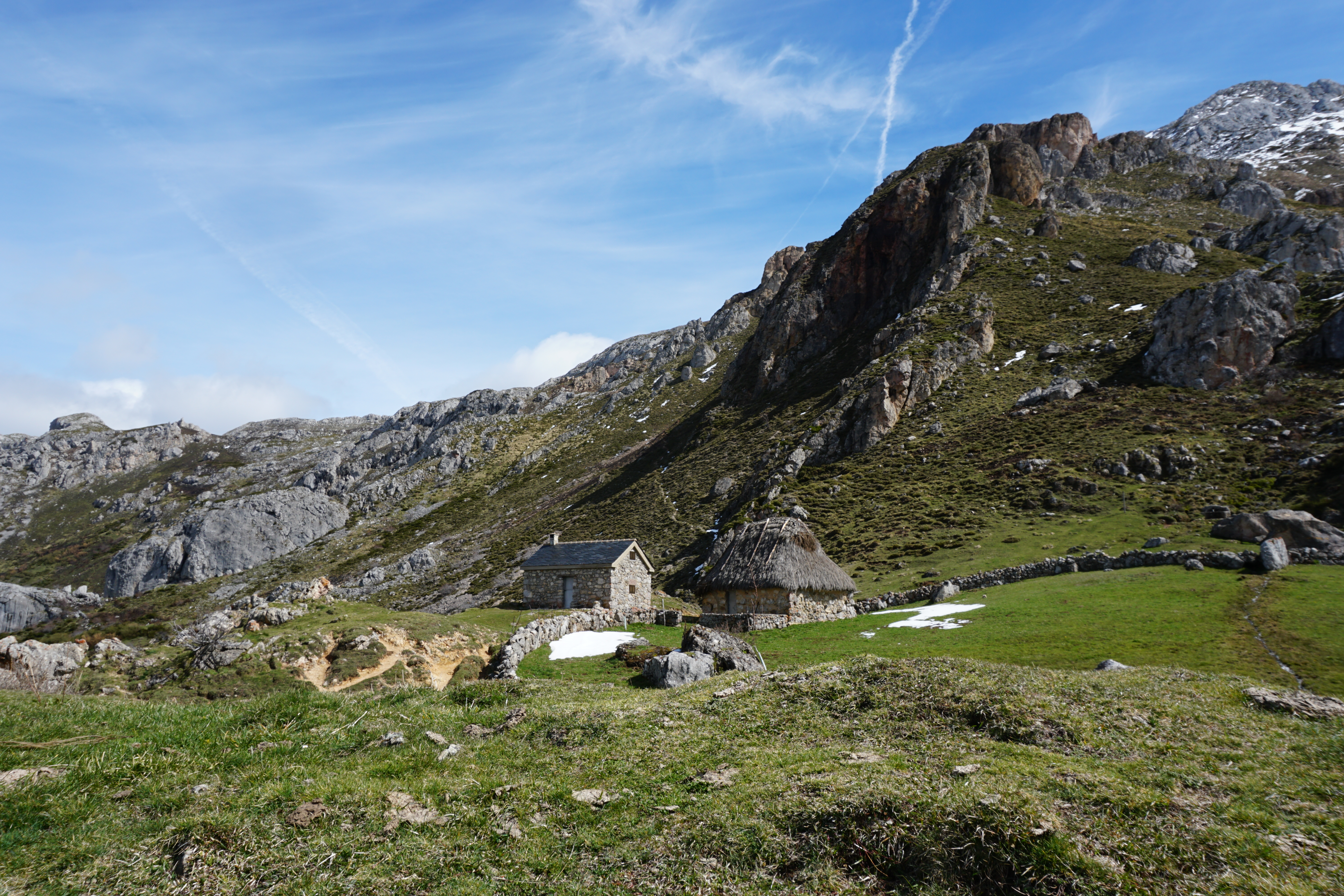
Shelters next to Lago del Valle in the Vaqueiro summer braña of Valle de Lago

A braña is a seasonal pasture in the Cantabrian Mountains of northwest Spain, particularly in Asturias, Cantabria, and northern León. Brañas support several types of transhumance and can be used during different periods of the year, though the word is most often associated with summer usage.

Brañas are located in the mountains and hills far above towns, usually at between 700 and 1800 meters in altitude. Winter brañas are located at lower altitudes closer to towns, while summer brañas are located higher up in the mountains.

== Etymology ==
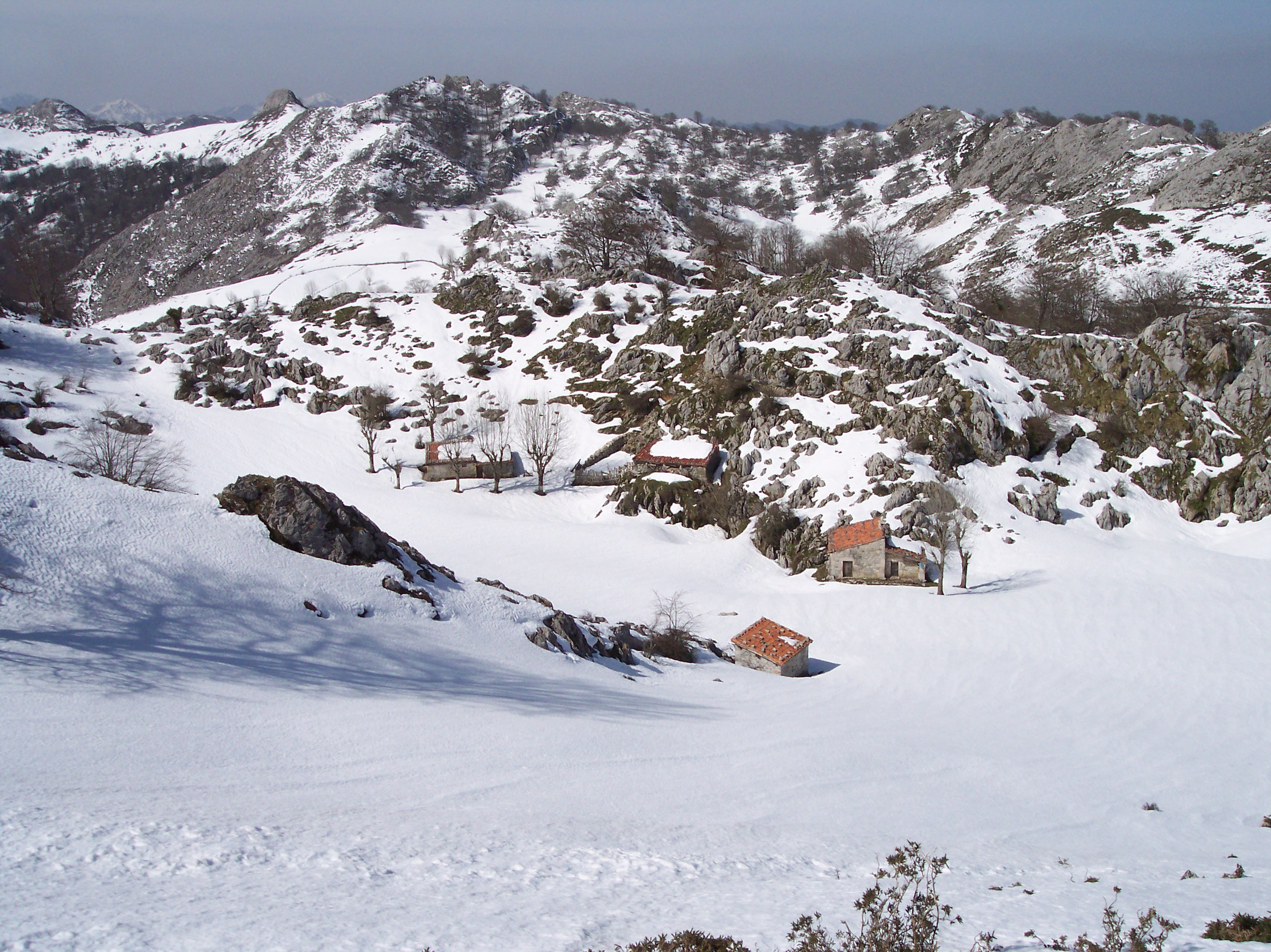
Majada de Gumartini near Covadonga during winter

The word braña most likely comes from the Latin verania meaning "summer" (compare Asturian branu, "summer"). However, some authors attribute the word to Proto-Celtic *brakna, "wetland", which is the meaning of braña in Galician.

In the eastern Cantabrians, the term invernal is often used to refer specifically to winter pastures and in central and eastern Asturias the term majada, mayada, mayáu, or mayéu is sometimes used instead of braña for pastures of all seasons.

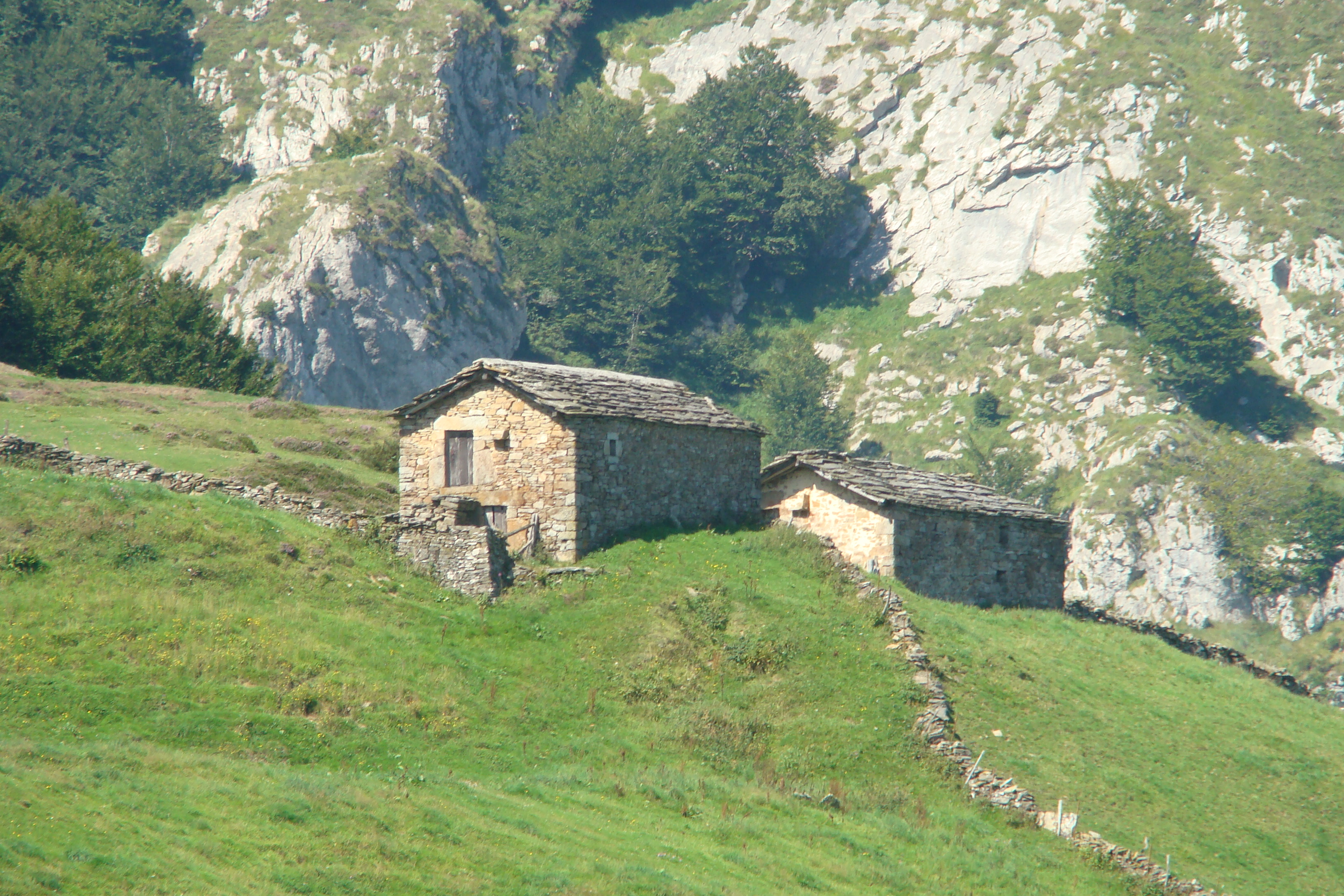
Pasiego cabins in a braniza in Soba

The Pasiegos of the Valley of Pas use the word braniza in place of braña.

== Architecture ==
Characteristic of the brañas are several types of small stone huts for pastors, Vaqueiros, and their livestock. The most common are small structures called cabañas that have a square or rectangular layout. Siding is made of stone, most often slate, and the roof is made of stone, tile, or wood. These huts are for the pastor or Vaqueiro while smaller similar huts called cortes are for the livestock.

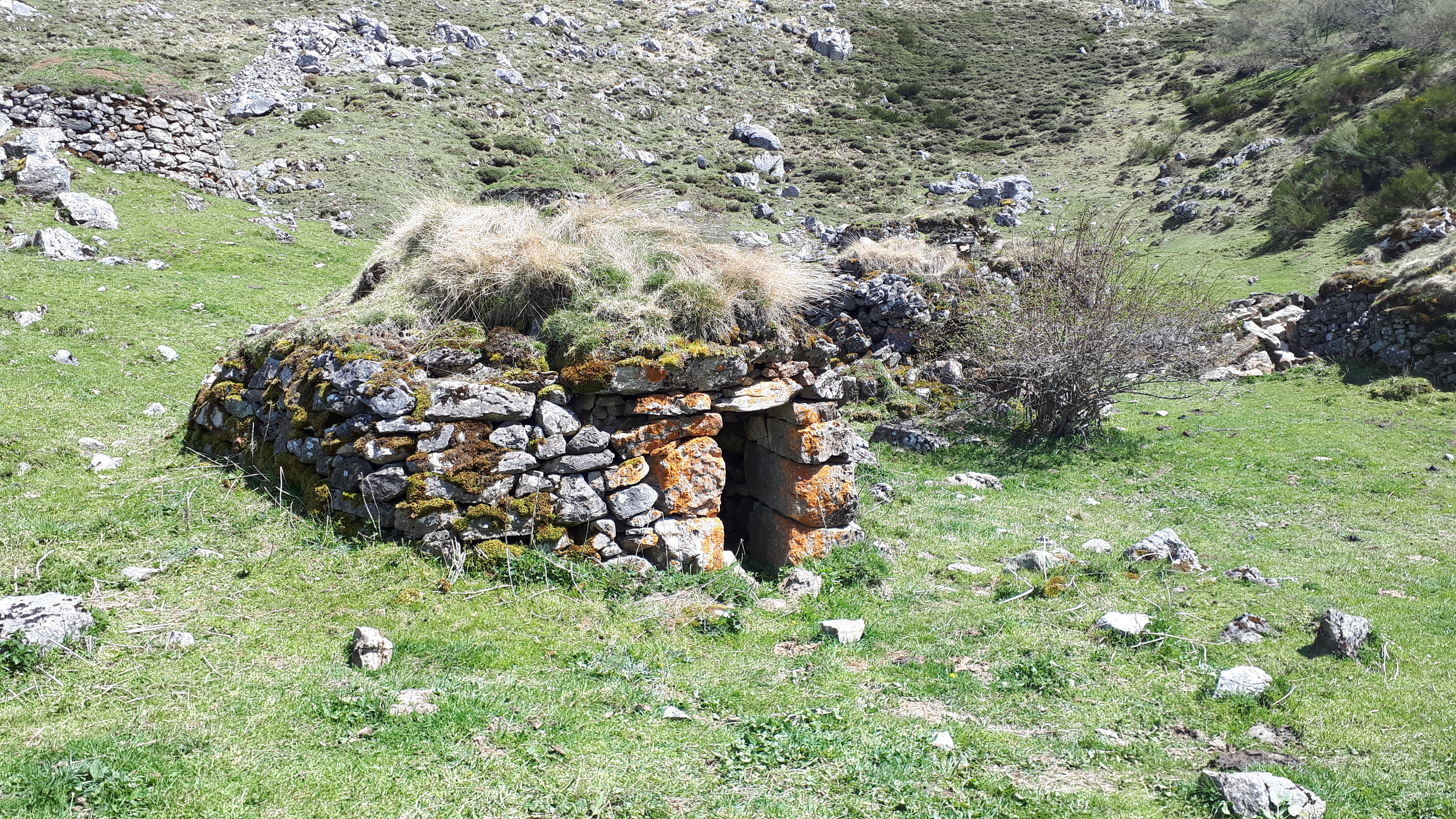
A corru in Braña de Sousas near Valle de Lago

Small stone huts with a circular layout are called corros or chozos and are most often used as shelter for calves. Roofs are made of stone but sometimes have grass grown on them.

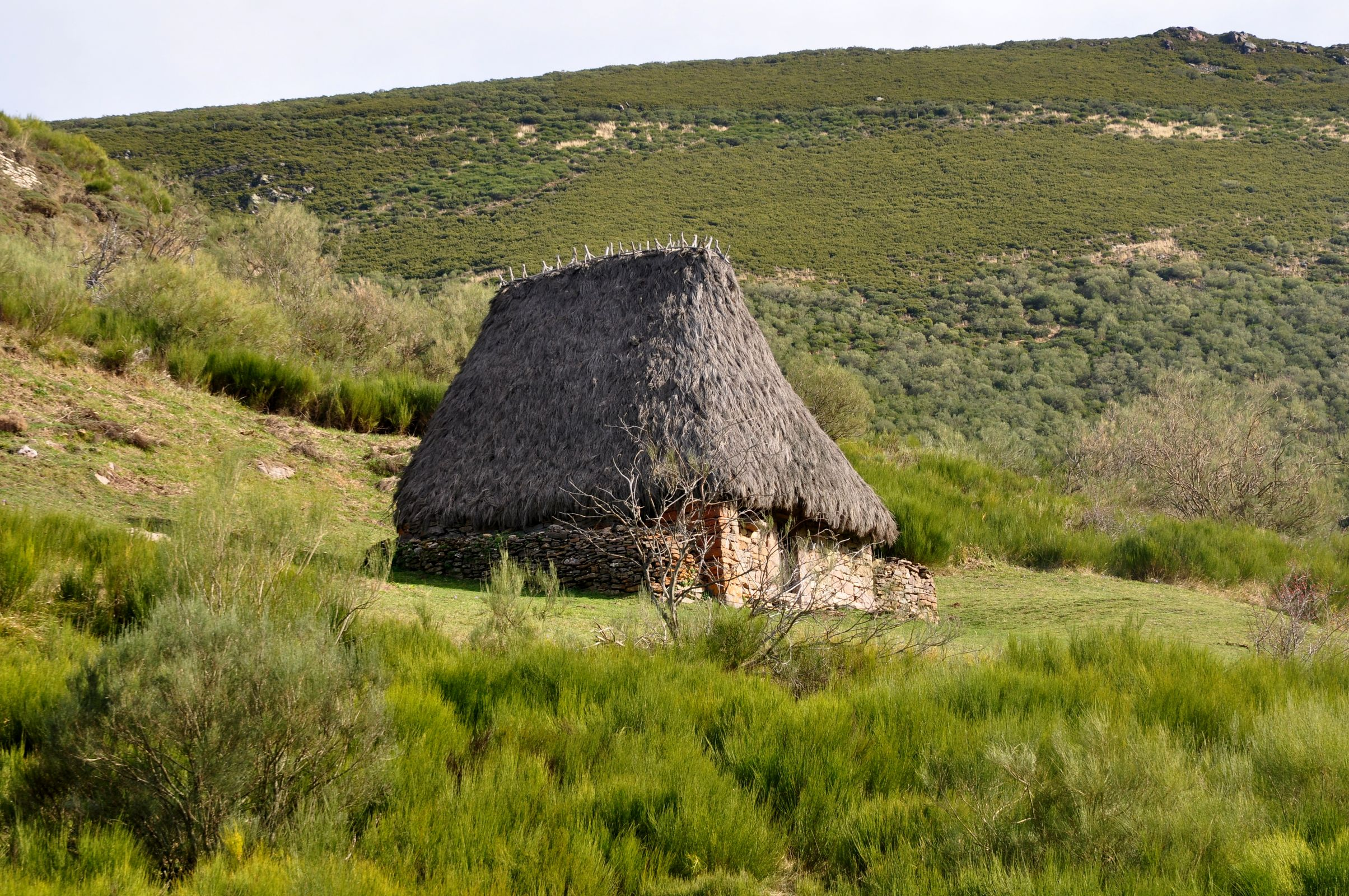
A teitu in Somiedo

Teitos are stone houses with arched roofs made of straw which are common in southwestern Asturias, especially Somiedo. The most famous teitos are in the braña of Pornacal, which today serves as a tourist attraction.

== Transhumance ==
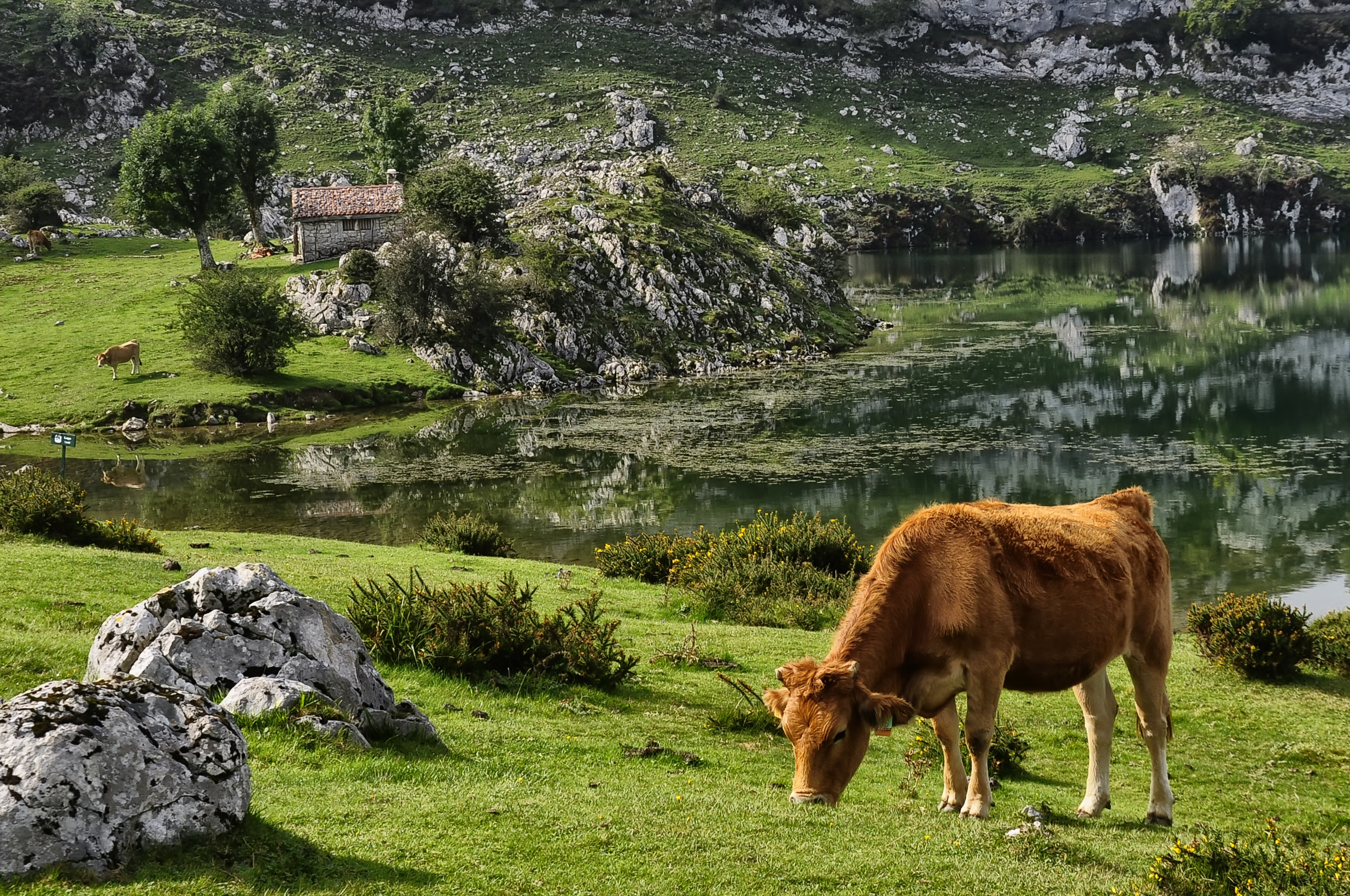
Cattle grazing in a braña next to Lagos de Covadonga

Non-Vaqueiros that practice transhumance in the Cantabrians practice a short-range form. They have three types of brañas: winter brañas, summer brañas, and brañas used in between seasons called brañas equinocciales. Cattle, horses, and smaller livestock such as sheep, goats, and pigs spend time in the brañas, though goats more often spend the whole year in open pastures. Today, the brañas are most often only used for cattle.

In non-Vaqueiro brañas, usually only a single family member goes to the braña with the livestock, while the rest of the family stays in the town. Structures in these brañas provide temporary shelter for the pastor and their livestock against the elements.

Transhumant pastors spend June to August in the summer braña and September, October, and March through May in the brañas equinocciales. From November through February, they live in the town while the livestock lives in the winter braña nearby.

== Vaqueiros de Alzada ==
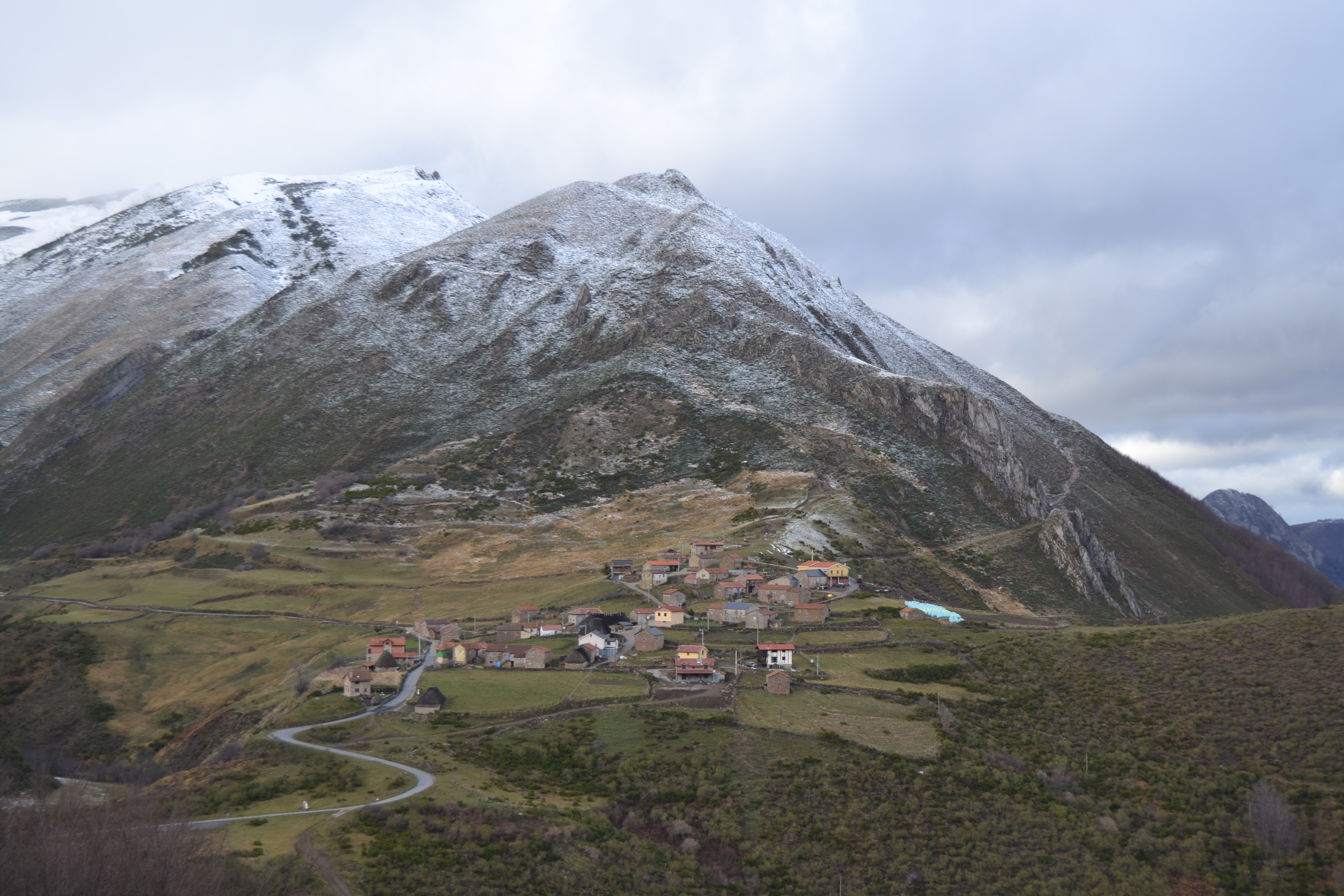
The Vaqueiro summer braña of La Peral in Somiedo

The Vaqueiro people live with their whole families and spend their lives in the brañas, which are their ancestral homes. Their primary livestock is cattle but they began to raise smaller livestock alongside cattle in the 20th century. Vaqueiro brañas are mostly situated in the west of Asturias and León.

Unlike non-Vaqueiro transhumant pastors, Vaqueiros traditionally practice long-range transhumance with a minority practicing medium range transhumance to summer brañas closer to the coast. Also contrasting non-Vaqueiro pastors, Vaqueiros have two types of brañas: a summer braña and a winter braña. They do not have brañas equinocciales.

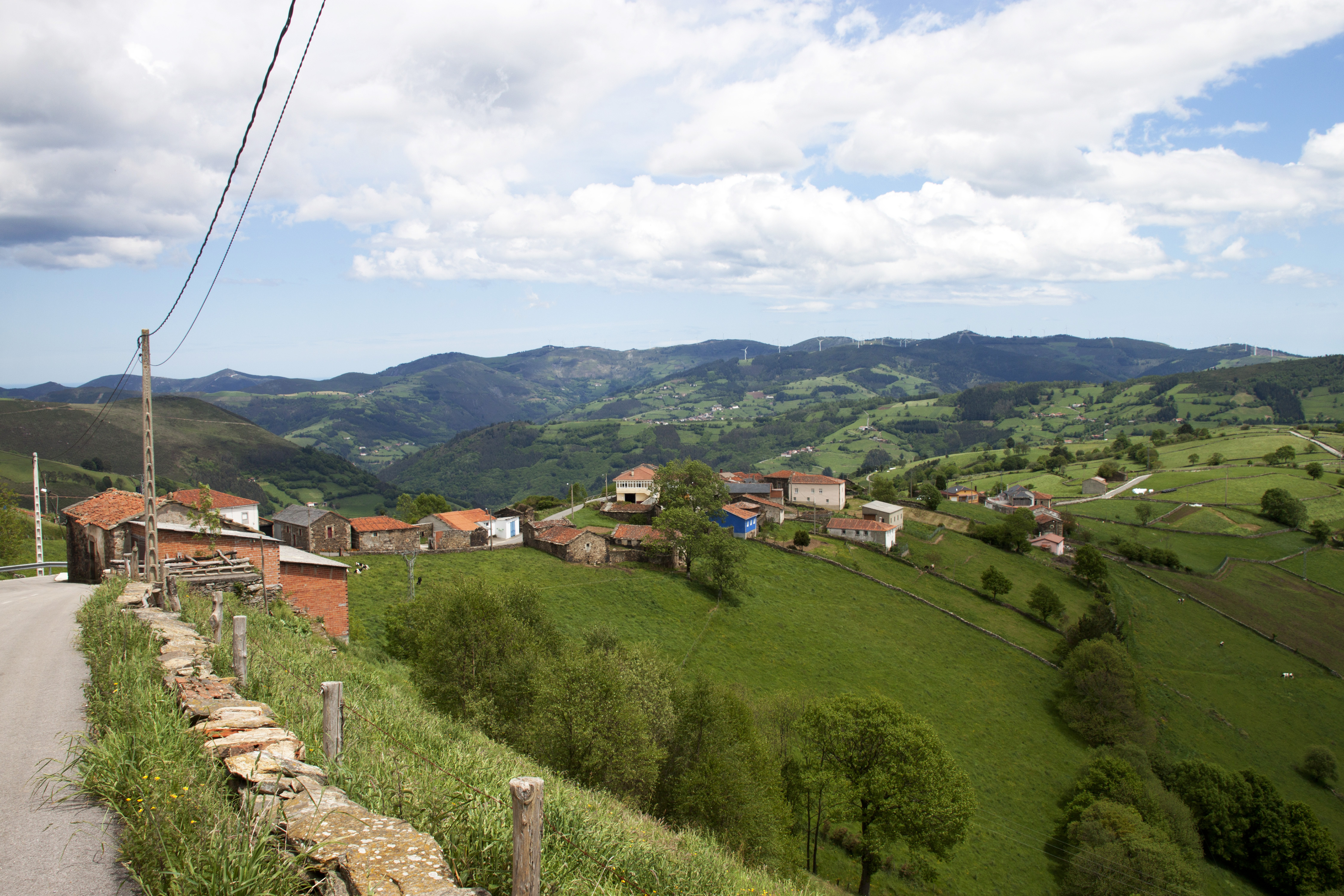
The Vaqueiro winter braña of Cezures in Salas

Vaqueiros call their journey between brañas, particularly the journey up to the summer braña, the alzada, or "raising", because they "raise" their homes. The Vaqueiros living the farthest west spend less time in the summer braña (June to August) than the eastern-most Vaqueiros who spend the most time in the summer braña (April to October).

Vaqueiros are semi-nomadic pastoralists and the brañas are their traditional homes. Because of this, the structures in Vaqueiro brañas are usually permanent and intended for more than temporary shelter from the elements.

== Flora and Fauna ==
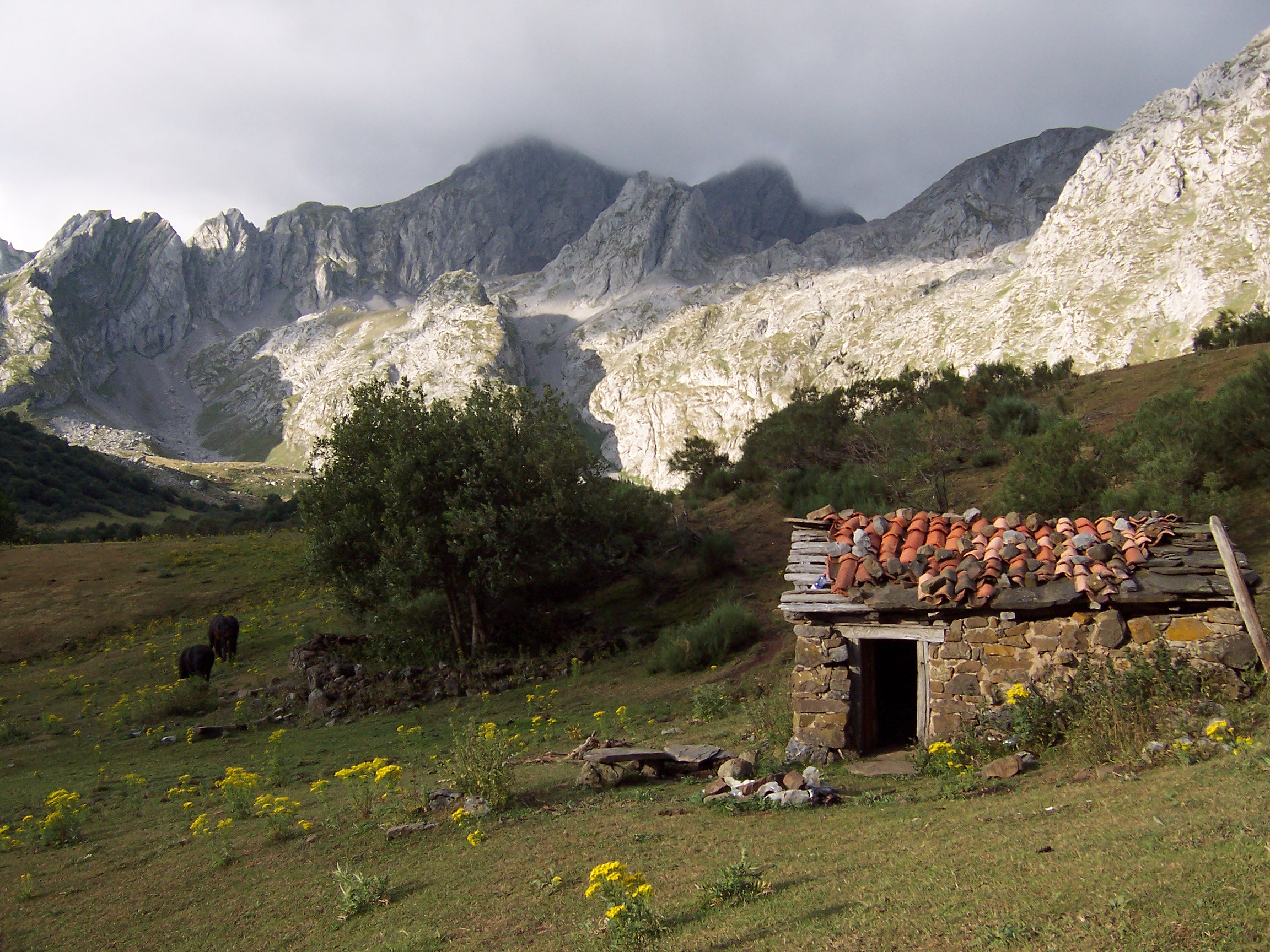
A braña cabaña near Tuíza

Many alpine plant species and orchids can be found in the brañas including gentians, saxifrages, and rock jasmines, and at the highest brañas even some arctic plant species such as moss campion and purple saxifrage.

There are endemic animal species native to the braña areas of the Cantabrian Mountains such as Cantabrian brown bears, Cantabrian chamois, and Cantabrian capercaillies alongside endemic Cantabrian plant species.

== Today ==
Many brañas today are abandoned, particularly those especially difficult to reach, but some are still used, usually just for cattle.

Abandoned brañas are popular hiking spots, and throughout southwest Asturias can be found many official hiking trails that go through these brañas. Other brañas have been restored and turned into tourist attractions.

Vaqueiros still live in their brañas though they experience a declining population due to rural flight and a declining Vaqueiro population. Many Vaqueiro brañas, particularly winter brañas, gained town infrastructure, services, and town status in the late 20th century, leading to their denomination as braña-pueblos, or "braña-towns".

Many brañas can be found within the UNESCO Biosphere Reserves of Somiedo, Valle de Laciana, Babia, Las Ubiñas-La Mesa and the Natural Park of Fuentes del Narcea, Degaña, and Ibias.

== Bibliography ==
- Concepción Suárez, Julio; García Martínez, Adolfo; Mayor López, Matías (2008). Las brañas asturianas: Un estudio etnográfico, etnobotánico y toponímico [Asturian Brañas: An Ethnographic, Ethnobotanic, and Toponymic Study] (in Spanish). Oviedo: Real Instituto de Estudios Asturianos. pp. 18–21. ISBN 978-84-87212-73-4.
- López Gómez, Pablo; González Álvarez, David; Fernández Mier, Margarita. "Los espacios ganaderos de alta montaña en la Cordillera Cantábrica: su registro arqueológico". El registro arqueológico y la Arqueología medieval. Alhulia: 409–434.
