= Orallo =

Orallo might refer to:

- Orallo, Queensland, a locality in the Maranoa Region, Queensland, Australia
- Orallo, Villablino, a locality in Villablino municipality, Spain
- Orallo River, in Villablino municipality, Spain
