= Vaqueiros de alzada =

Northern Spanish transhumant people in the mountains of Asturias and León

Vaqueiros d'alzada
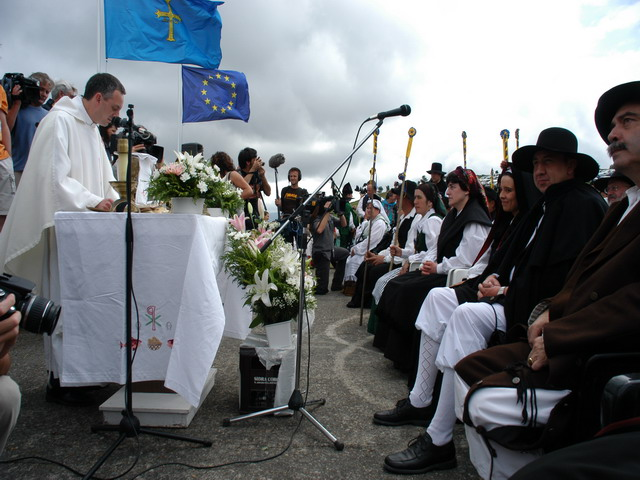
- Vaqueiro-style wedding

Total population
- Unknown

Regions with significant populations
- Spain (Asturias and León) with significant diaspora in Argentina, Cuba, France, Madrid, Mexico, and United States
- Asturias: 6,448 (1980 est.)

Languages
- Asturleonese, Spanish

Religion
- Predominately Roman Catholicism mixed with an ethnic religion

Related ethnic groups
- Pasiegos, Maragatos, Asturians, Leonese

The Vaqueiros de Alzada (Asturian: Vaqueiros d'Alzada, "transhumant cowherds" in Asturian language, from their word for cow, cognate of Spanish Vaquero) are a northern Spanish people in the mountains of Asturias and León, who traditionally practice transhumance, i.e. moving seasonally with cattle.

Vaqueiros have a culture separate from their non-Vaqueiro Asturian and Leonese neighbors and can often be distinguished by their last names, many of which are unique to Vaqueiros including Alonso, Ardura, Arnaldo, Berdasco, Boto, Calzón, Feito, Gancedo, Gayo, Lorences, Parrondo, Redruello, Riesgo, Sirgo, and Verdasco among others.

== Distribution ==
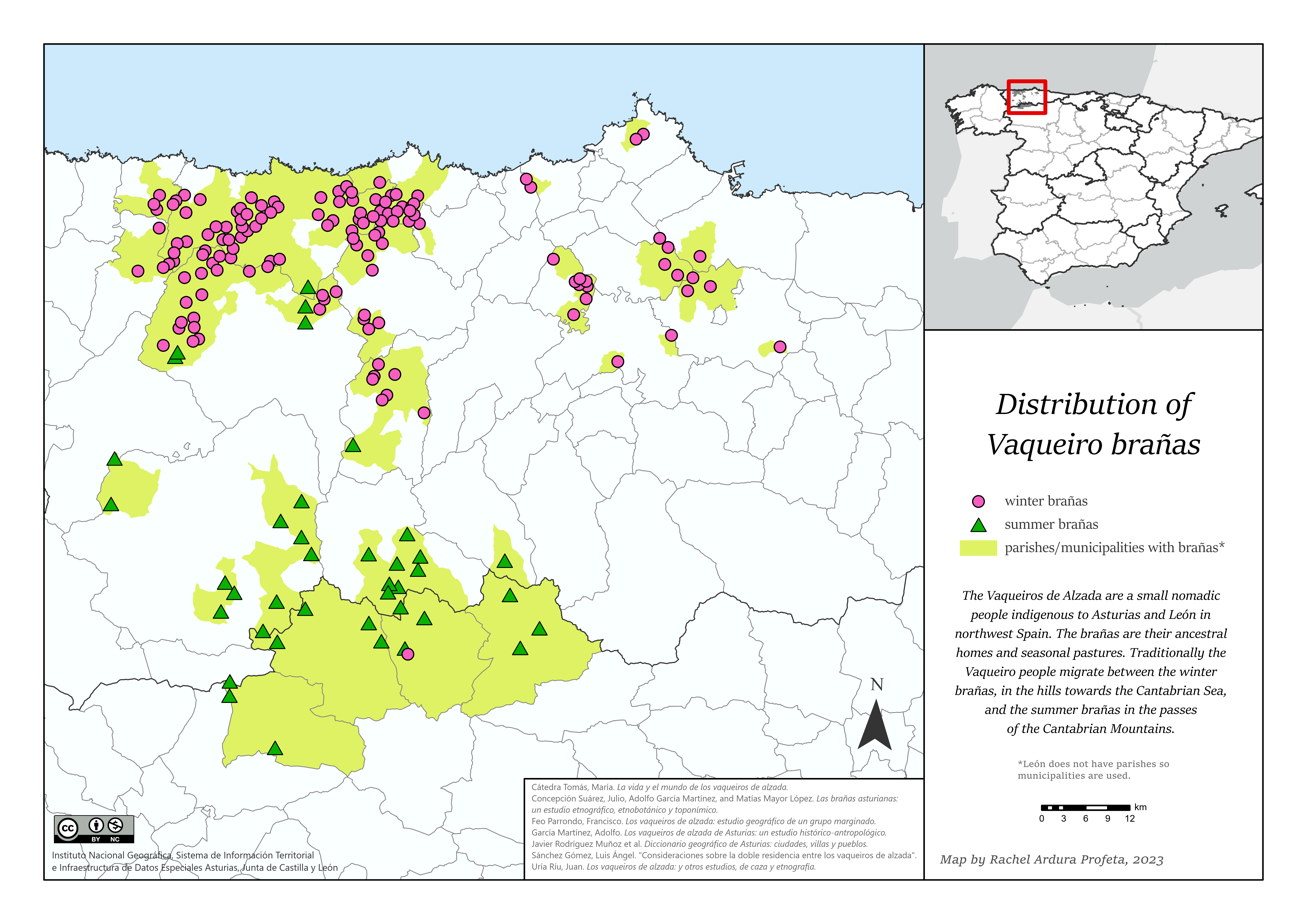
A map of Vaqueiro brañas

The ancestral territory of the Vaqueiros is in western Asturias and northwestern León. The traditional communities, or brañas, of the Vaqueiros can be found in the Asturian municipalities of Belmonte de Miranda, Cangas del Narcea, Cudillero, Gijón, Gozón, Llanera, Navia, Oviedo, Pravia, Las Regueras, Salas, Siero, Somiedo, Teverga, Tineo, Valdés, Asturias, and Villayón and the Leonese comarcas of Laciana, Omaña, El Bierzo and Babia (es).

There is a diaspora throughout Spain, Latin America, and the United States with a particularly large diasporic community in Madrid. Large areas of Vaqueiro immigration can be found in Cuba, Argentina, Mexico, and France with substantial populations in the states of Florida, New York, West Virginia, and the Western United States, especially Nevada.

== History ==
=== Name ===
The word Vaqueiro is an exonym and until more recent years, this term was not frequently used by Vaqueiros themselves. In Vaqueiro Territory and surrounding areas, the term Vaqueiro is used exclusively to refer to the Vaqueiros de Alzada and has connotations of race and ethnicity instead of a profession. De Alzada was added by Gaspar Melchor de Jovellanos to help distinguish the Vaqueiros from the non-Vaqueiro cattle herding population. It comes from the Asturian verb alzar, to raise or to go up, after Jovellanos observed that the Vaqueiros raised, or brought their homes up, every summer to the higher summer brañas. The full name Vaqueiros de Alzada, which is used most often in outside sources, is not often used in Asturias and León.

Vaqueiros refer to valley-dwelling non-Vaqueiros as xaldos and coastal-dwelling non-Vaqueiros as marnuetos, maranuetos, or marinuetos, though in more recent years the term marnueto has fallen more out of use in favor of referring to all non-Vaqueiros as xaldos.

=== Origins ===
The exact origins of the Vaqueiros are unknown. The non-Vaqueiro population historically considered the Vaqueiros to be descendants of Muslim Moriscos, particularly Moriscos from Alpujarras, though most anthropologists consider this unlikely.

=== Early accounts ===
Vaqueiros do not have a tradition of writing and therefore lack their own early written documents.

The first specific written mention of the Vaqueiros is in 1433 CE in a receipt by the Count of Luna (es), detailing his payments to a group of Vaqueiros migrating to Laciana. 52 years later in 1485 CE, in a written account of attacks against Vaqueiros and their cattle, it is mentioned that the Vaqueiros consider themselves a people.

Most of early written Vaqueiro history is recorded in civil cases brought up by Vaqueiros against discrimination, physical attacks, and land theft.

=== Contemporary ===
The drafting of Vaqueiru men has been a major early cause of assimilation of Vaqueiros into non-Vaqueiro society. During the Spanish Civil War, important Vaqueiro brañas were burned in the fighting, including El Puerto (Somiedo) and Torrestío (es) in Babia which burned in 1937.

The first Vaqueiro Wedding and Festival was held in 1958.

From the 1960s to the 1980s, the last of the transhumant brañas became sedentary. Although few entire brañas are still transhumant, transhumance still exists within the Vaqueiro community in Vaqueiro Territory.

The Council of Vaqueiro Culture was founded in 2016 in the braña of El Pevidal in Salas and held its first Forum of Vaqueiro Culture that year.

== Demographics ==
The exact number of Vaqueiros, in Vaqueiro Territory and abroad, is uncertain and the majority of the last estimates come from the end of the 20th century. An estimate from 1965 put the Vaqueiro population at around 15,000 in Asturias and another from 1980 estimated 6,448 Vaqueiros in Asturias.

There are more Vaqueiros in diaspora than remaining in Vaqueiro Territory and there are estimated to be more Vaqueiros in Madrid alone.

== Transhumance ==
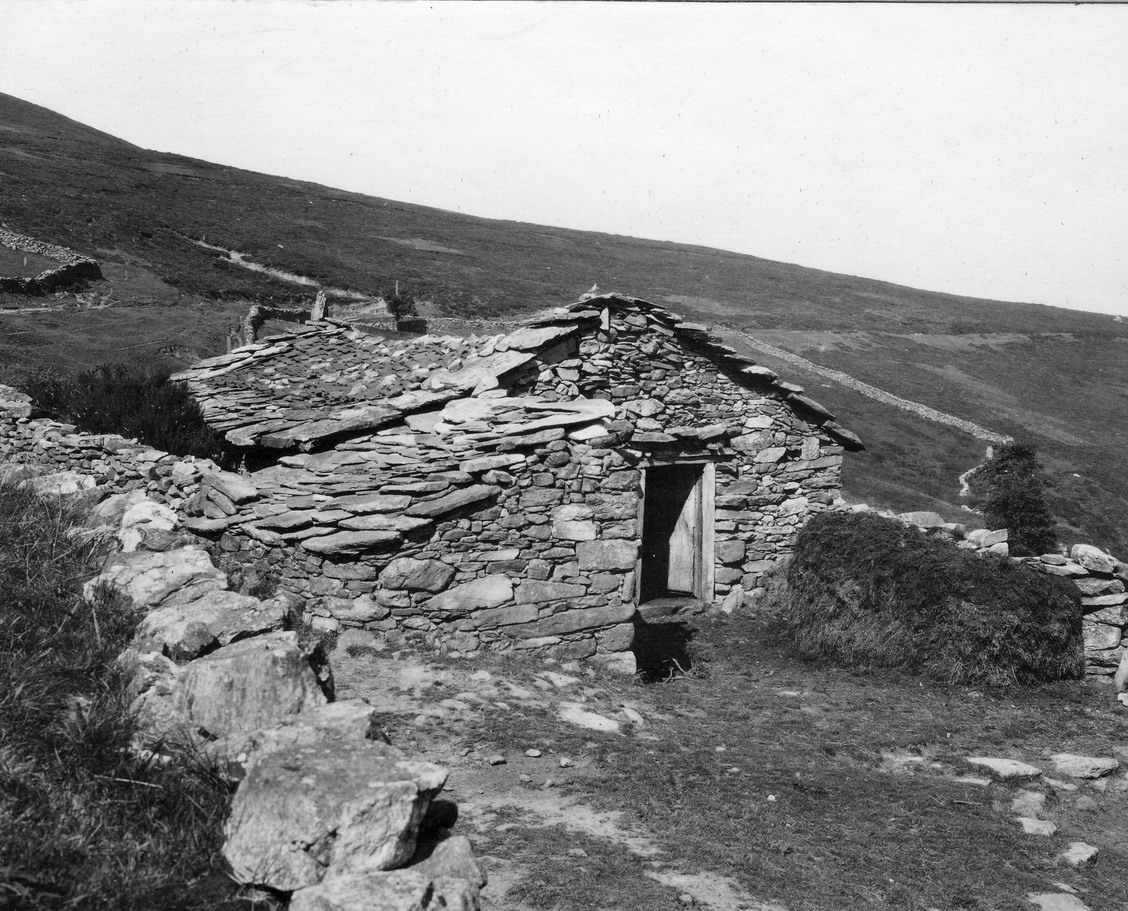
A house in the summer braña of Las Tabiernas, 1927

Traditionally, the Vaqueiro people practice transhumance with their cattle, the vaca roxa, the Asturian Mountain cattle, but most Vaqueiros today have become sedentary and many have assimilated into non-Vaqueiro society. Vaqueiros spend the summer months in the summer brañas in the Cantabrian Mountains and the winter months in the winter brañas, closer to the coast of the Cantabrian Sea. Vaqueiro transhumance can be differentiated from non-Vaqueiro transhumance in that all Vaqueiros traditionally lived in the brañas year-round which they considered their true home and ancestral land where as non-Vaqueiro transhumant herders did not live with their families in their brañas which just served as seasonal pastures.

Vaqueiros who live in the brañas further east spend more time in the summer brañas, from April to October, while Vaqueiros who live in the more western brañas spend more time in the winter brañas, only spending June to August in the summer brañas. There are a minority of Vaqueiros who participate in a shorter distance transhumance, with summer brañas also located near the coast and nearer to the winter brañas, particularly in Tineo and Cangas del Narcea.

=== Arriería ===
A significant minority of Vaqueiros participated in trading and hauling goods by mule, called arriería and trajinería. Vaqueiros who participated in arriería transported goods between Asturias and Castile while Vaqueiros who participated in trajinería worked shorter routes. In later centuries, the Vaqueiros who participated in arriería also transported travelers between Madrid and Asturias on foot or by mule.

== Economy ==
Vaqueiros traditionally made their living off the sale of calves at cattle fairs. Extra money was made by selling linen, butter, milk, and cheeses in the markets of non-Vaqueiro towns.

== Culture ==
=== Religion ===
Though Vaqueiros consider themselves to be Roman Catholic, Vaqueiros traditionally practice a mix of Roman Catholicism and a traditional folk religion. Vaqueiros have been historically considered “bad Christians” for their beliefs and for their dedication to their animals and have been persecuted by the Church.

Vaqueiros venerate their patron saint, la Virgen del Acebo, the Virgin of the Holly Tree, whose shrine is in Cangas del Narcea, alongside Saint Anthony (both Anthony of Padua and Anthony the Great). Vaqueiro beliefs also incorporate ancestor worship of the ánimas, the souls of the dead.

Vaqueiro religion designates creatures and objects as blessed or cursed and divides the world into three domains: the sky, the earth, and the underground, into which every living thing and non-living things including natural phenomena, days of the week, and phases of the moon, are divided into. Sickness and misfortune are caused by the disorder of these domains. Vaqueiro healing implements spiritual healers and traditional medicine to maintain universal order. The Christian concept of Hell is a foreign concept to Vaqueiros. Although the Vaqueiro world is divided into sky, earth, and the underground, hell is not associated with the underground and has no spatial location. Instead, the “bad place” is associated with the suffering and misfortunes of life.

=== Kinship ===
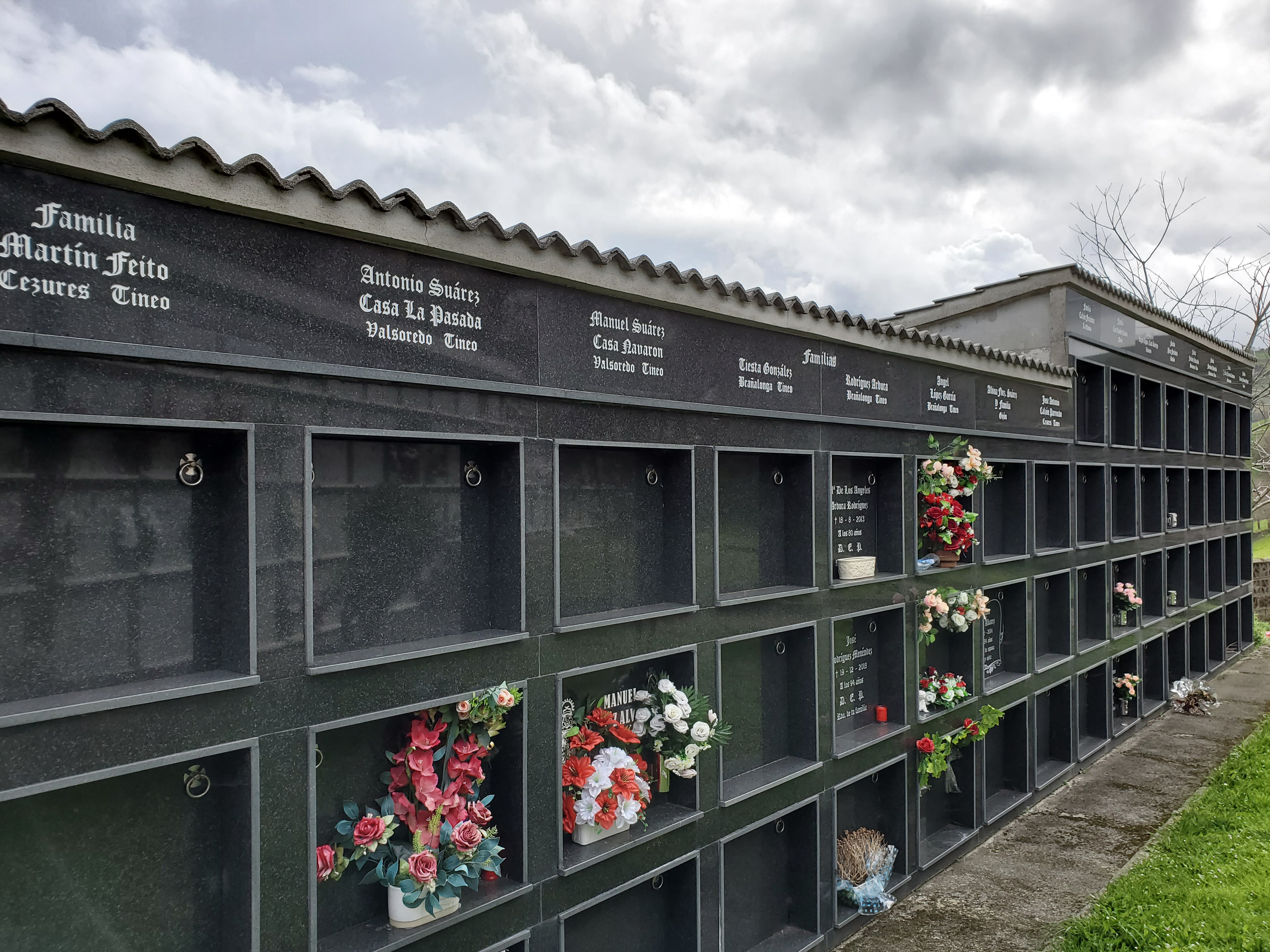
Vaqueiro graves with the family house and braña in Brañaḷḷonga

Vaqueiro society is largely patrilineal and patrilocal. It relies on the system of casa, or the house, as a system of inheritance and as a broader spiritual concept. The house includes its living members, deceased members, ancestors, the physical houses, the land associated with the physical houses, the animals of the house, and all the physical belongings of the house. The head of the house is responsible for making leadership and financial decisions for the house and leadership is passed down completely when the previous head dies or partially when the previous head is unable to carry out the responsibilities as the head of the house. The house can only be inherited by one person as not to divide the house and the head may choose anyone to pass the house on to, regardless of age or gender, though it is almost always passed down to the oldest son.

Marriages were traditionally arranged and the goal of the family of the bride was to marry her into a house of greater prestige than their own. Marriages were arranged with a neutral intermediary and the bride's family gave a dowry, which often consisted of livestock or agricultural products, but never land. Vaqueiros are traditionally endogamous within their ethnic group, only marrying other Vaqueiros, and exogamous between houses, only marrying outside the house.

Vaqueiro houses have names which are separate from their surnames. Outside the house, Vaqueiros are called by the name of their house, and at their death, the name of their house along with the name of their braña is listed on their grave alongside their given name and surnames.

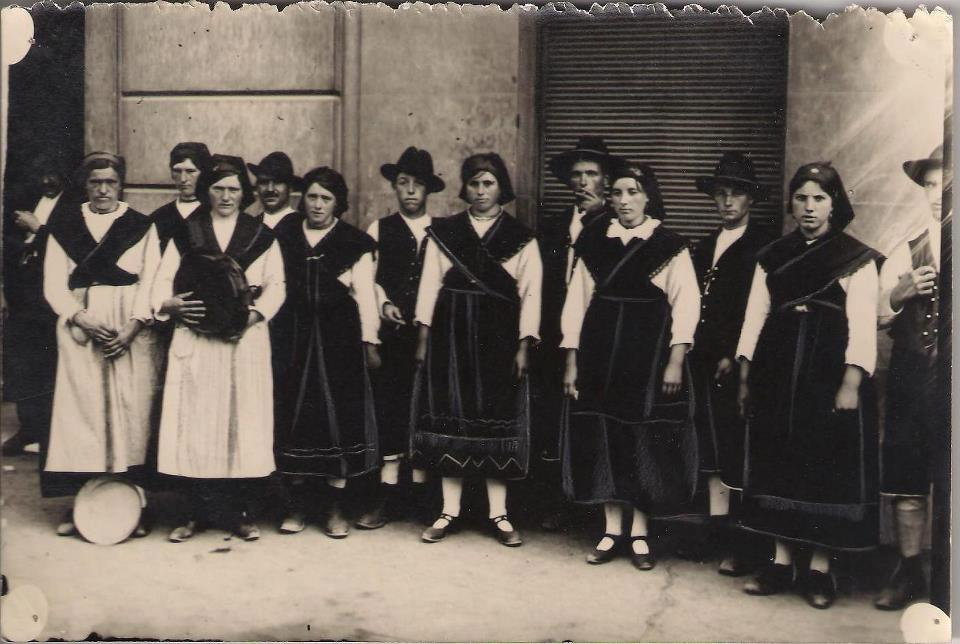
A dance group of Vaqueiros in Gijón, early 1920s

=== Music ===
The most popular form of Vaqueiro music is vaqueirada, verses usually arranged into 3/8 or 6/8 time and characterized by complex rhythms on the pandeiru, a traditional frame drum. A popular instrument unique to the Vaqueiros is the payeḷḷa or payetsa, an iron pan whose long handle is stroked with a large metal key to create sound, usually played by a Vaqueira elder.

=== Language ===
Traditionally, Vaqueiros speak their own dialect of Asturleonese which is most similar to Paḷḷuezu, save for the easternmost Vaqueiros that migrate between Torrestío and speak their own dialect which more closely resembles a central dialect of Asturleonese. The che vaqueira (es), is characteristic of the Vaqueiro dialect and it is named after the Vaqueiros. Today, most Vaqueiros speak Spanish.

=== Agriculture & cuisine ===
Transhumant Vaqueiros participated in subsistence farming and engage in swidden agriculture, an uncommon practice in Spain. Vaqueiros commonly grow clover, wheat, alfalfa, rye, maize, and potatoes. The introduction of maize greatly impacted Vaqueiro agriculture for maize grows faster than wheat or other staple foods. Much of what Vaqueiros grow is to be consumed by their cattle. Vaqueiro houses traditionally kept two pigs and slaughtered one once a year on a feast day. Vaqueiros did not often slaughter their own cattle except for ritual sacrifices.

The most emblematic food of Vaqueiro culture is gurupu, a mix of maize flour, soup, and bacon. Pulientas, a dish of maize flour mixed with potatoes and water is also a popular Vaqueiro food. Cuayada is a common dairy product eaten among Vaqueiro families. Because wheat flour was often prohibitively expensive to Vaqueiros, wheat breads were eaten on special occasions, such as pan del choru, a wheat bread eaten on wedding days.

== Discrimination and racism ==
Discrimination against Vaqueiros has been recorded since nearly the first written record of Vaqueiros. Vaqueiros were segregated in most public places, particularly the Church, and were banned from running for local office or from voting. Because Vaqueiros were transhumant and lived in the brañas, some Vaqueiros did not pay taxes or tithes which led to the forced sedentarization of Vaqueiros for purposes of tax collection.

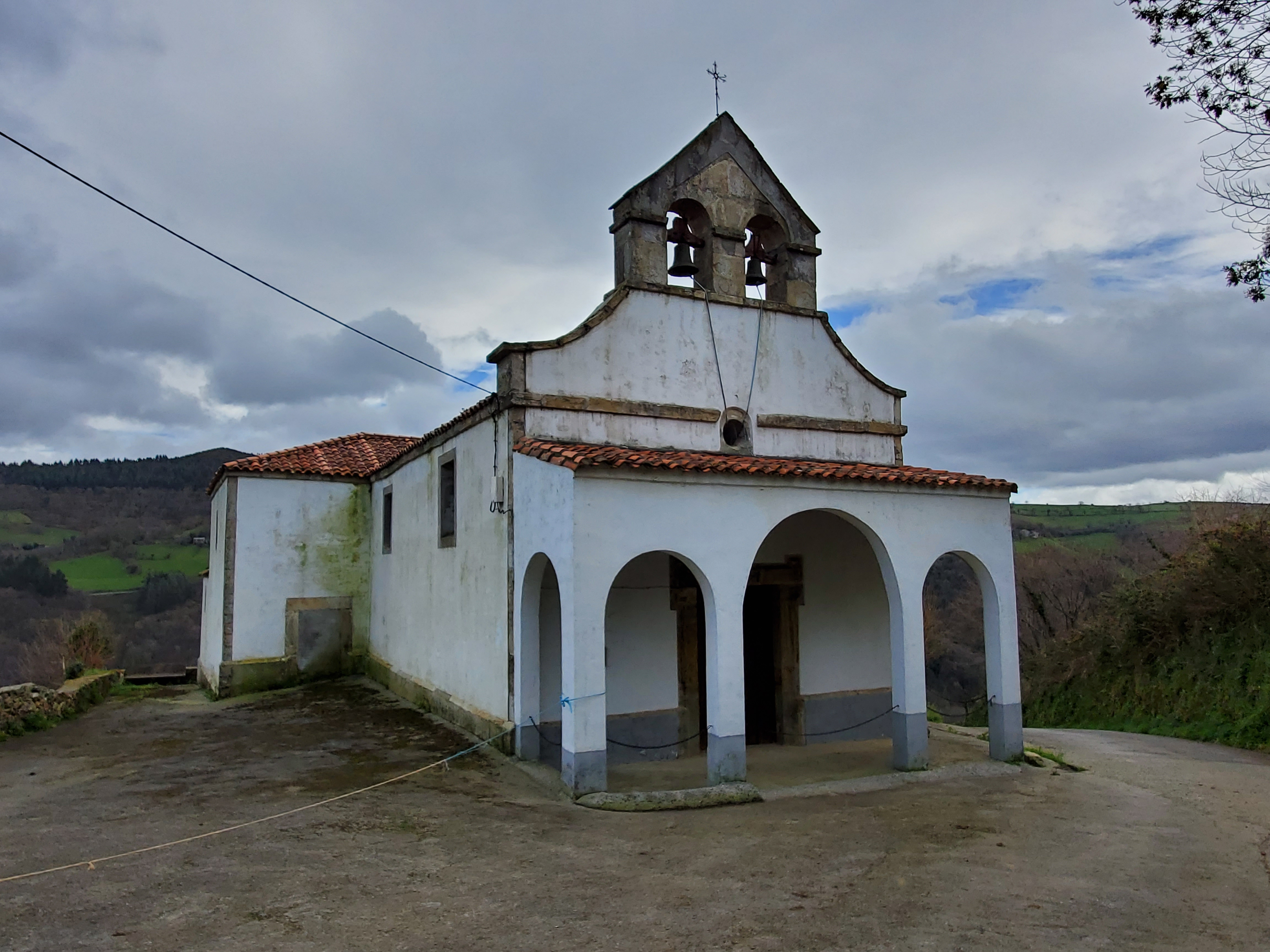
The church of Brañaḷḷonga with a filled-in door on the left which was formerly the door for Vaqueiros

For most of their known history, Vaqueiros were considered a separate and inferior race to non-Vaqueiro Asturians and Leonese and the concept of purity of blood was evoked to oppress Vaqueiros on the basis that they were an inferior race. In 1551, Vaqueiru men were ordered to be castrated by regidor Don Diego das Marinas to prevent Vaqueiros from reproducing. Vaqueiros were the subjects of scientific racism, in particular a case in the early 20th century in which the Vaqueiros of the braña of Buspol in Salas were the subjects of phrenological studies in which they were deemed ‘mongoloids’. The Vaqueiros were considered by race scientists and their non-Vaqueiro neighbors to be brachycephalic due to inbreeding, though they have proven to be no more brachycephalic than nearby non-Vaqueiro populations.

Segregation of Vaqueiros occurred in churches, cemeteries, bars, and holiday festivals. Early church segregation most often presented as class segregation between nobles, peasants, and Vaqueiros, with Vaqueiros at the bottom of the hierarchy and eventually evolved into ethnic segregation, dividing non-Vaqueiros and Vaqueiros. In bars, Vaqueiros were not allowed to drink out of glasses and instead were made to drink from cups made of animal horns. In 1844, a law was passed to make segregation illegal, however it was largely ignored and did little to curb the segregation of Vaqueiros. It is difficult to tell when exactly the segregation of Vaqueiros ended, but there are reports of segregated churches as late as 1955.

A suicide epidemic among the Vaqueiros has been active since at least the 1960s and the Vaqueiros have one of the greatest suicide rates in Europe, with a mortality rate of 28 per 100,000.

Today, Vaqueiros face environmental inequality and a lack of opportunities. Many Vaqueira brañas lack sufficient roads, some lack electricity, and others lack running water. Many Vaqueiro brañas face environmental threats such as mining. In 2007, an electrical substation was installed in the braña of Buspol in Salas, notwithstanding the protests of the Vaqueiros.

== Genetics ==
A study of Vaqueiro mitochondrial DNA by Pedro Mercader Gómez et al. in 2013 suggests that the Vaqueiros are native to western Asturias and share a common background with non-Vaqueiros but have evolved to become genetically distinct from the non-Vaqueiro Asturian and Leonese population.

== Recognition ==
The Vaqueiro people are not currently recognized as an ethnic group by the Spanish government.

The Vaqueiro region, or Comarca Vaqueira (es), exists in Asturias as primarily a touristic region and does not cover all of Vaqueiro Territory or offer any land rights to Vaqueiros as a people.

== Notable people of Vaqueiro descent ==
- Luis Feito (1929-2021), painter
- Rosa Montero (born 1951), journalist and author
- Gil Parrondo (1921-2016), art director, set decorator, production designer
- Marilina Ross (born 1943), actress and singer
- Silvia Calzón (born 1975), Spanish epidemiologist and politician
- Fernando Verdasco (born 1983), professional tennis player
