= Orallo, Villablino =

Coordinates: 42°58′N 6°21′W

Orallo
- Locality
- Interactive map of Orallo
- Country: Spain
- Autonomous community: Castile and León
- Province: León
- Comarca: Laciana
- Municipality: Villablino

Population (2017)
  - Total: 194
- Time zone: UTC+1 (CET)
  - Summer (DST): UTC+2 (CEST)
- Postal code: 24113

Orallo is a locality within the municipality of Villablino in the Spanish province of León. It is located approximately 5 km (3.1 mi) north of the main centre of Villablino along the CV-101-11. Orallo's major landmark is the Church of Santa Marina, which dates back to medieval times. The Orallo River runs beside the town just to the west.
