= Paḷḷuezu dialect =

Asturian-Leonese dialect of Spain

Pachuezo
- Patsuezu
- Paḷḷuezu
- Native to: Spain
- Region: Laciana, in southwest Asturias and northwest León.
- Ethnicity: Leonese
- Native speakers: hundreds - a few thousand (2010)
- Language family: Indo-European: Italic; Latino-Faliscan; Romance; Italo-Western; Western; Ibero-Romance; West Iberian; Asturleonese; Leonese; Pachuezo

Language codes
- ISO 639-3: –
- Glottolog: None

Paḷḷuezu (also known as Patsuezu, Pachuezu, Patsuezo, Pachuezo, or Nuesa Ḷḷingua ("our language")) is a dialect of Asturian-Leonese, which is one of the Iberian Romance languages. It is one of eight recognized dialects of the Leonese language in the narrow sense of the designation "Leonese" (i.e., excluding Asturian, Cantabrian, Eonavian, and Mirandese).

Paḷḷuezu is spoken in the upper half of the valley of the Sil River, in the comarca of El Bierzo, which is in the northwest of the Province of León, and to a minor extent in the province of Asturias, in the lands north of this portion of the Sil valley. The majority of Paḷḷuezu speakers reside in the municipality of Laciana. Paḷḷuezu is also spoken upriver from Laciana in the municipality of Babia, downriver from Laciana in the municipalities of Palacios del Sil and Páramo del Sil, and elsewhere.

Palacios del Sil and Páramo del Sil are part of an ancient district called Ribas de Sil, and this name is still in use. (The toponym Ribas de Sil occurs also in Galician speaking territory to the west, in the neighboring Province of Lugo.) The number of speakers of this dialect is unknown. However, the combined population of all speakers of Asturian-Leonese in the provinces of León and Zamora is only 20,000 to 25,000.

== Orthography ==
Jota Vaqueira, traditional song in Paḷḷuezu

The Asturian spelling Ḷḷ ḷḷ, called "che vaqueira" is used where l.l has sometimes been used if it is impossible to write ḷḷ. It can be a voiceless retroflex affricate [tʂ], a voiced retroflex plosive [ɖ] or a voiced retroflex affricate [dʐ], and it corresponds to standard palatal lateral approximant /ʎ/, written Ll ll and called "elle". The latter spelling is current in publications of the Paḷḷuezu literary revival that has been underway since approximately 2006.

== Main consonantal features ==
The main consonantal features distinguishing this dialect from Spanish (many of which are common to Astur-Leonese generally) are:

English	Latin	Paḷḷuezu	Spanish
people	gent-	xente	gente
yoke	iugum	xugu	yugo
frozen	gelatus	xiláu	helado
son-in-law	gener	xenru	yerno
leaf	folia	fuecha	hoja
flame	flamma	chama	llama
rain	pluvia	chuvia	lluvia
nail, pin	clavis	chave	llave
lead (metal)	plumbum	chumbu	plomo
hill	lumbus	ḷḷombu	lomo
dove	palumba	palumba/palomba	paloma
fed up with; surfeited	fartus	fartu	harto
tongue; language	lingua	ḷḷingua	lengua

- It preserves the phoneme [ʃ] (voiceless palatal fricative), spelled 'x'.
- Latin /-li-/ becomes the voiceless palatal affricate [tʃ], spelled ch.
- Latin /pl-,cl-,fl-/ become [tʃ].
- Latin /-mb-/ is preserved.
- Latin /f-/ is preserved.
- Latin initial /l-/ palatalizes into the apico-postalveolar voiceless affricate spelled ḷḷ (termed "che vaqueira" in Spain, "cowherd ch" used by the transhumant herders of the region, who form a distinct society) which used to be spelled ts. This is distinct from the Pal.luezu palatal affricate ch.

== Grammatical features ==
- Possessive adjectives are always preceded by the definite article: la mia fuecha 'my leaf' (Spanish mi hoja). (This is usually the case in Catalan, Portuguese and Italian too.)

== Literary revival ==
In 2006, an anthology was published, Cuentos del Sil [Tales of the Sil] (Severiano Alvarez and eight other authors), Na Nuesa Ḷḷingua. ISBN 84-611-0061-1. For the year 2009, the Asociación Club Xeitu de la Montaña Occidental Astur-Leonesa (founded 2009) started an annual literary competition, the Certamen Lliterariu "Guzmán Álvarez". The competition continued in 2010 and 2011.
