= Orallo River =

River in Spain

Coordinates: 42°58′N 6°21′W

Orallo is a river in northern Spain, in the province of León. It runs through a narrow valley just to the west of Orallo, a locality in Villablino municipality.
