= Cabaña pasiega =

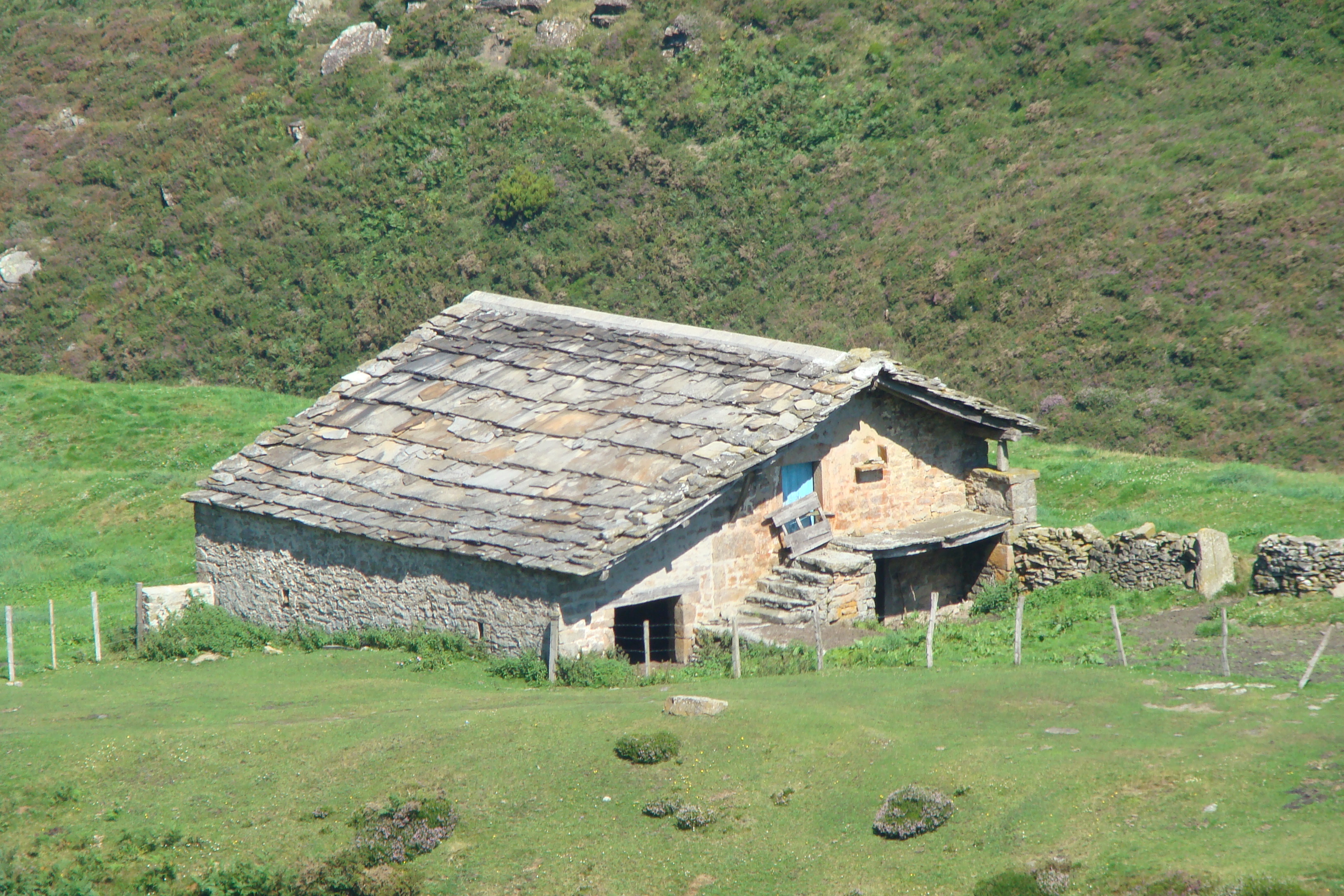
Cabaña pasiega typical in the hamlet of Rulao (Soba).

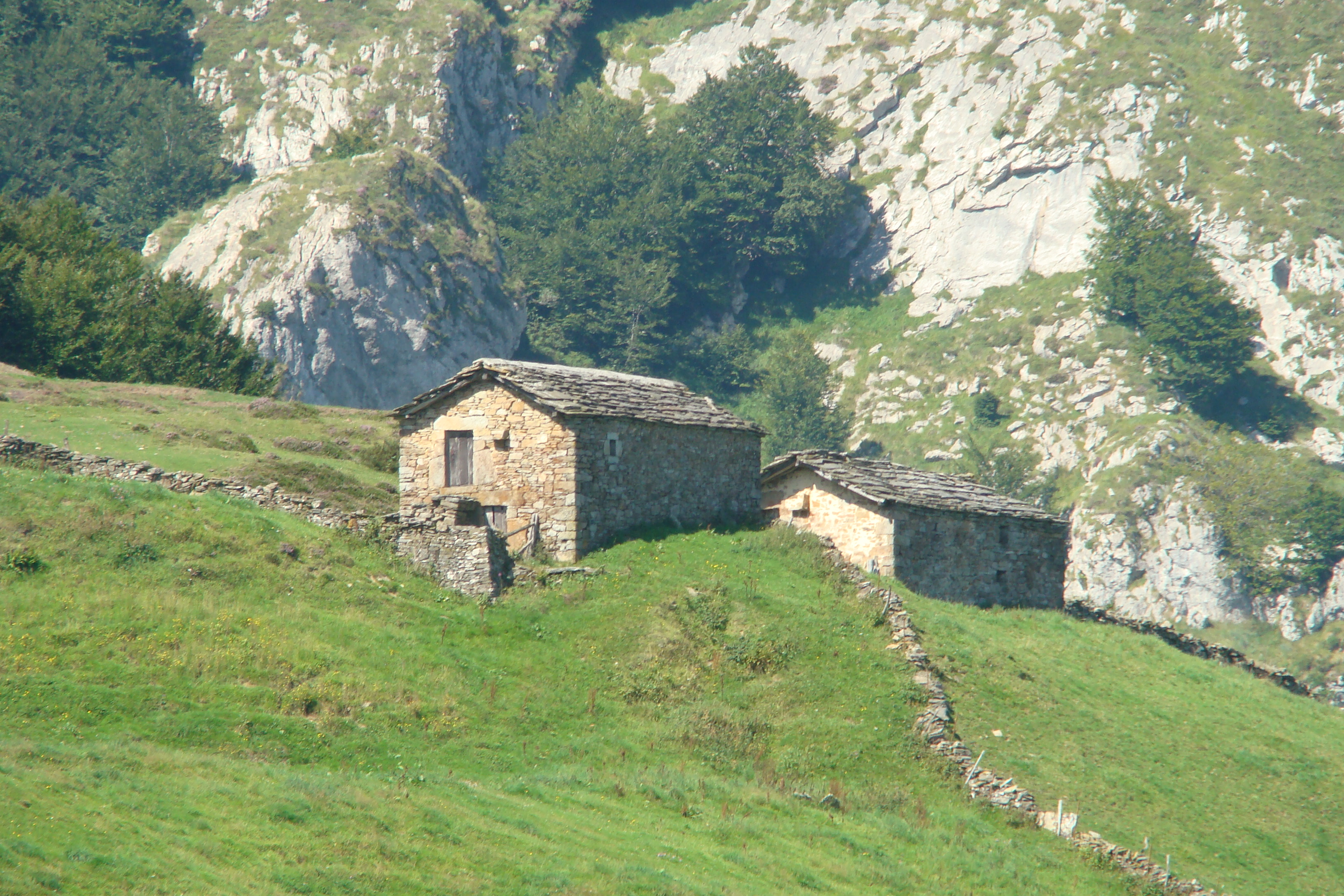
Cabins in the hills of the Asón River.

The cabaña pasiega is a type of mixed popular architecture (housing-livestock building called a housebarn), typical of the Cantabrian mountains, above all, from the upper valleys of Asón and Pas, whose contrasted origin dates back to the 16th century.

== Typology ==
Usually it is a warehouse buildings, divided into two levels, with support in the perimeter walls and in one or two pillars of the watershed of the roof. Are built on good-sized masonry, with limestone of the place, with roofs of slate flagstones. The access to ground floor, used as a stable for animals, is made directly from the field level by a door with wooden lintel. The upper floor, usually entitled to housing or warehouse, usually accessed through a Patín, consistent, in the most ancient examples, in a step ladder of slab, with a terrace or landing, which is usually covered with an extension of the eaves cover. Sometimes, when the cabin is on steep slope, is made from the side access located in the high altitude, although it is not usual. Holes in the walls are scarce and small in size, as a defense against the cold.

== Character ==
These cabins were always linked to a livestock farm, and to the Pasiego system of transterminance called mudas between low areas and urbanizadas in the valleys, and high grasslands. In the warm season, the cattle were taken to these high fresh meadows, called branizas, for the summer, the family moved to the cabin during that period. By autumn, returning to the lowlands. Very rarely, the cabins were occupied throughout the year, in which case it could be the coexistence of two or more buildings in a single payment, and in recent times (19th and early 20th centuries), only were moved the younger members of the families.

This character connected to a livestock farming, causes usually have attached a fence, closed by low stone wall, known as fincas or llave
