= San Emiliano =

Coordinates: 42°58′18″N 6°00′03″W

San Emiliano, Spain
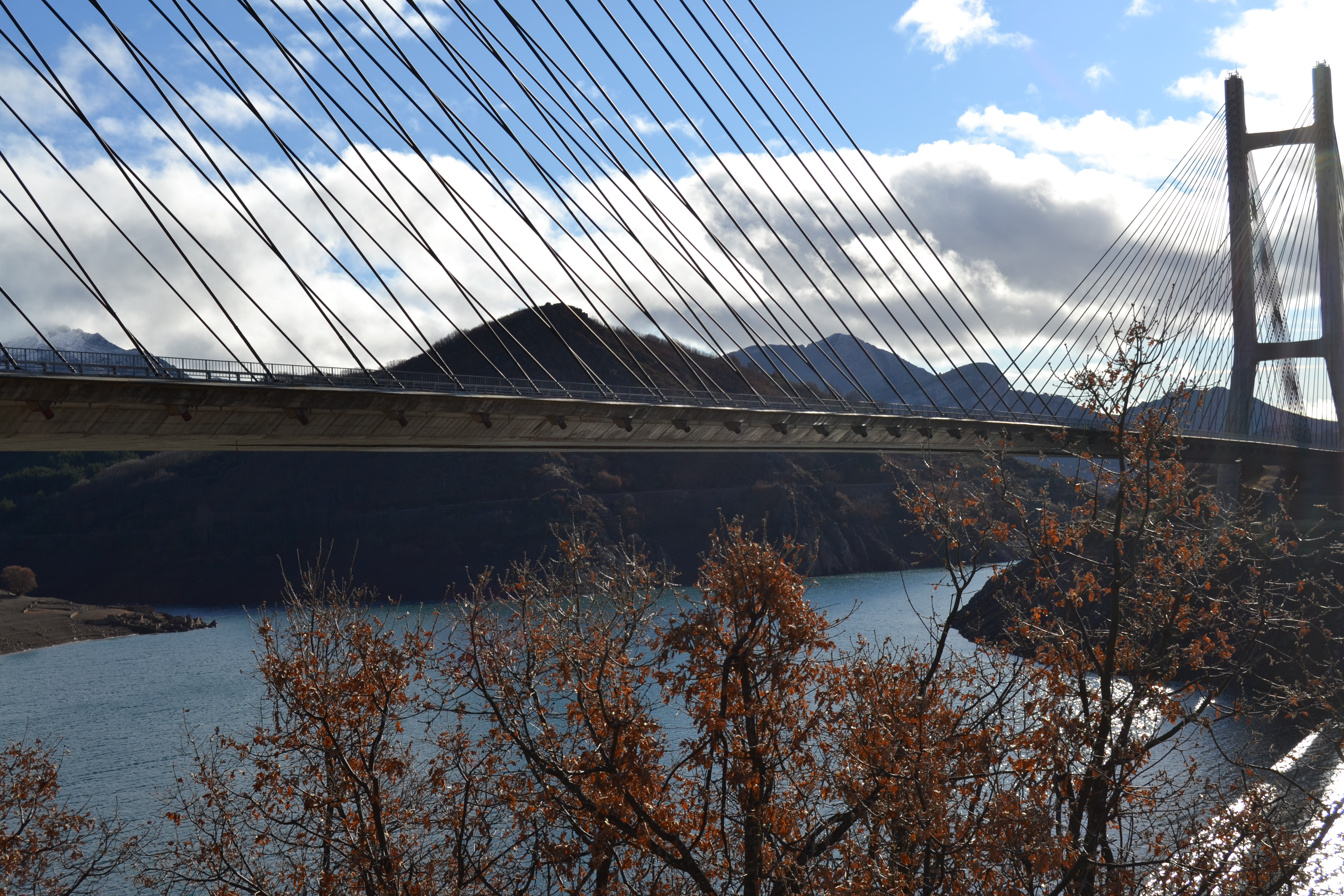
- San Emiliano: Bridge over the Pantano de Luna ("lunar marshland")

- Coat of arms
- Interactive map of San Emiliano, Spain
- Country: Spain
- Autonomous community: Castile and León
- Province: León
- Municipality: San Emiliano

Area
  - Total: 210 km^{2} (81 sq mi)

Population (2025-01-01)
  - Total: 585
  - Density: 2.8/km^{2} (7.2/sq mi)
- Time zone: UTC+1 (CET)
  - Summer (DST): UTC+2 (CEST)

San Emiliano (Santu Michanu in Leonese) is a municipality located in the province of León, Castile and León, Spain. At the 2011 census (INE), the municipality has a population of 706 inhabitants. The municipality is a known for tourism as for their small county state in Spain.

== Language ==
The local dialect is known as Paḷḷuezu, a variant of the Leonese dialect, itself a dialect of Asturleonese, used in the northern part of the province.
