= Villabandin =

Coordinates: 42°52′N 6°08′W

Villabandín is a small hamlet, part of 15 or so that lead approximately 100 kilometers North-West from the city of León towards Villablino in Castile and León in north western Spain. It is made up of two parts with less than five residents living in one while the major part of the hamlet has a collection of houses, barns, a church, a bar (which remains shut for most of the year), and a dance hall that are cut through by a river with two bridges on opposing sides. The hamlet lies between two valleys at an altitude of over 1,000 metres above sea level. The population is thought to be less than 10 people, all over the age of 65.

== History ==
The area where the hamlet lies is believed to have been invaded by the Moors. At the beginning of the twentieth century, fire caused destruction of much of the hamlet and it was renovated in 1902. Up until the 1980s it was inhabited by farmers who worked in the surrounding valleys herding sheep and cattle making a living from the land.

== Climate, Geography and Wildlife ==
The climate is characterized by warm, sun-filled summers contrasting with cold, often snow-filled winters. During the winter months most of the elderly inhabitants actually leave to be looked after by next of kin. The surrounding countryside is mainly inhabited by Spanish broom Spartium junceum, their yellow flowers providing swathes of colour over the landscape during the spring months. The surrounding picturesque area has a mountainous topology and is home to the Alto de la Cañada, which is its highest peak at 2154 m above sea level. At these higher altitudes common heather Calluna vulgaris is the dominant vegetation and the extreme isolation and remoteness is an ideal habitat for the chamois Rupicapra rupicapra and birds such as the red-billed chough Pyrrhocorax pyrrhocorax and cinereous vulture Aegypius monachus. Below the tree line forests of oak Quercus and broom dominate, and in this habitat wild boar Sus scrofa and roe deer Capreolus capreolus are also present.

== People ==
The festival of 'El Corpus' occurs in June, where people from the neighboring hamlets and town of Villablino come to celebrate. During the summer months the warmer weather brings in more people with generations of families returning for holidays.

== Media ==
Villabandin has been the focus of 'The Dying Villages Project' by the Scottish writer/poet Tom Pow, which was featured in Guardian news outlet about the world's depopulating villages. After reading about it in the Edmonton Journal, Pow chose the hamlet as his first location to visit and write about.
