= Valle de Lago =

Parish (parroquia) in Somiedo, Asturias, Spain

Coordinates: 43.066667°N 6.2°W

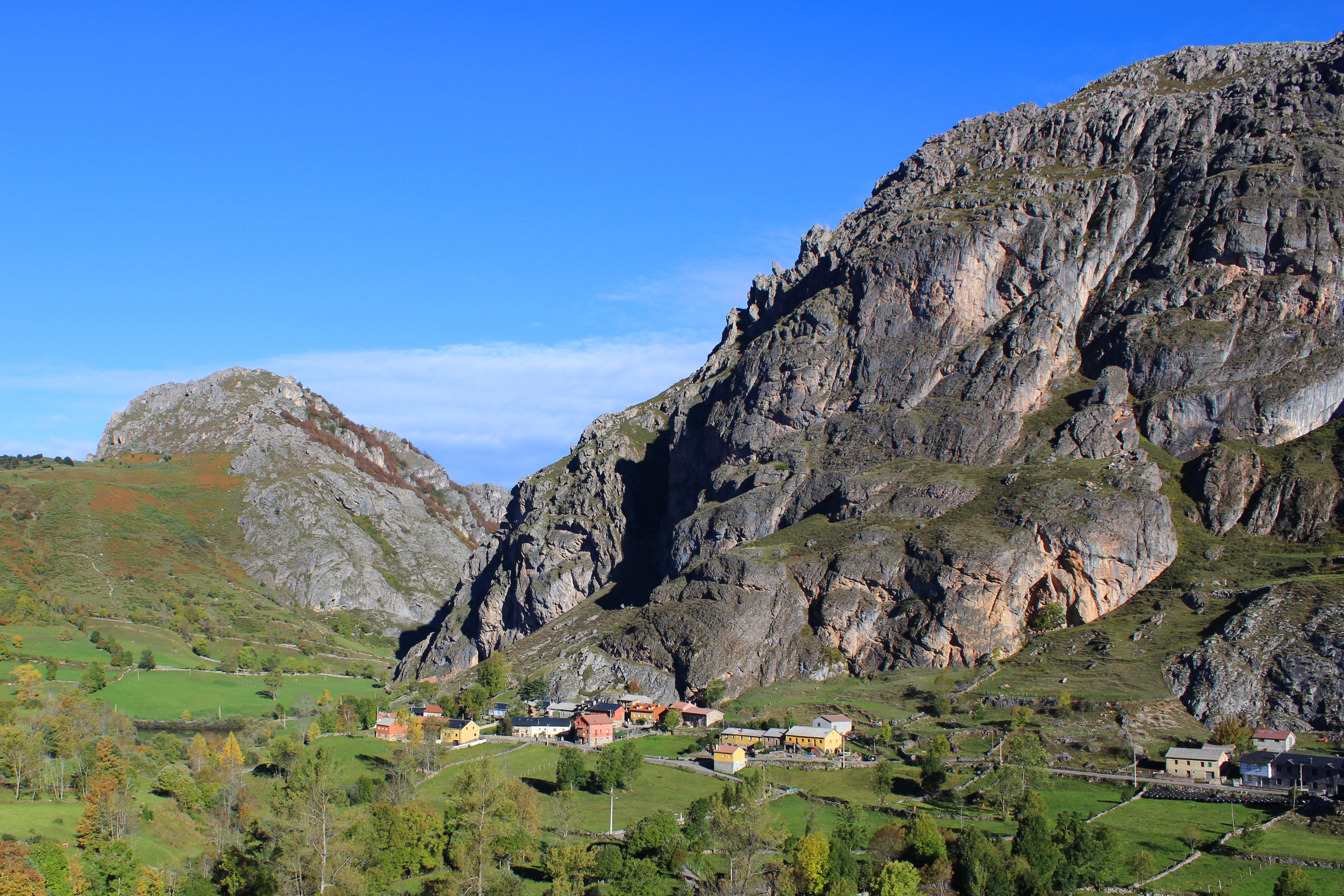
Valle de Lago

Valle de Lago is one of fifteen parishes (administrative divisions) in Somiedo, a municipality within the province and autonomous community of Asturias, in northern Spain.

It is situated at an elevation of 1,250 m (4,100 ft) above sea level. It is 29.76 km^{2} (11.49 sq mi) in size, with a population of 121 (2008). The postal code is 33840.

== Tourism ==
Valle de Lago tourism focuses on hiking, nature observation, and experiencing Asturian culture within the Somiedo Natural Park in Spain, a UNESCO Biosphere Reserve. Visitors hike to the Lago del Valle, the region's largest glacial lake, or explore traditional villages with historic architecture like teitos (stone huts).
