= Villablino =

Coordinates: 42°56′N 6°19′W

- Flag Coat of arms
- Interactive map of Villablino
- Country: Spain
- Autonomous community: Castile and León
- Province: León
- Municipality: Villablino

Area
  - Total: 228.23 km^{2} (88.12 sq mi)

Population (2025-01-01)
  - Total: 7,585
  - Density: 33.23/km^{2} (86.08/sq mi)
- Time zone: UTC+1 (CET)
  - Summer (DST): UTC+2 (CEST)
- Climate: Csb

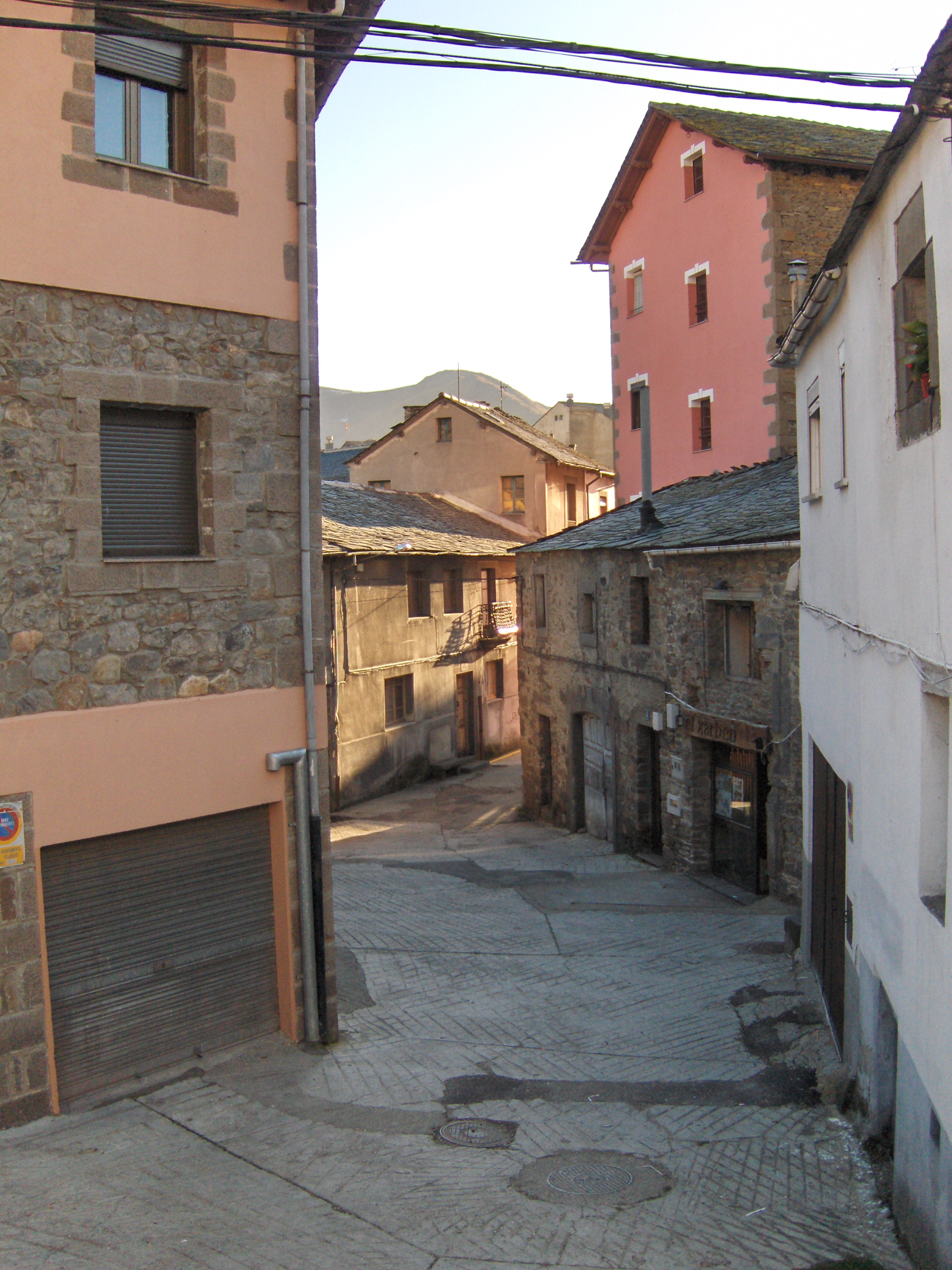
Street in Villablino

Villablino (Spanish pronunciation: [biʎaˈβlino]; Leonese: Vitsablinu) is a municipality located in the Laciana comarca of the province of León in the autonomous community of Castile and León, Spain. According to the 2011 Census, the municipality had a population of 10,353 inhabitants. It has the largest commercial, economic and social center of Northwest province, and it is one of the judicial districts in the province of León.

== Geography ==
Villablino is a mining town in the northern part of the Province of León and is situated on the southern slopes of the Cantabrian Mountains which form the border with the Province of Asturias. To the north lies Cangas del Narcea, the largest and oldest municipality in the Province of Asturias, and to the northeast lies Somiedo, also in Asturias. To the east is the municipality of Cabrillanes and to the southeast, Murias de Paredes, both in León. To the southwest lies the municipality of Degaña and to the west and northwest lies Cangas del Narcea, both in Asturias.

The rocks in this area are some of the oldest in Spain, being four hundred to six hundred million years old. The climate is characterised by warm, sunny summers contrasting with cold winters. Trekkers visit the area in summer and there are ski resorts in some of the nearby villages. Villablino is on the C-623 main road, which runs from Los Barrios de Luna, where the River Luna is dammed to form the Embalse de Barrios de Luna reservoir, and the LE-493 which has access to the north-south autoroute Autovía A-66 at La Magdalena. In the area lies the hamlet of Villabandin, which is one of the "Dying villages" written about by the Scottish poet Tom Pow.

The area of Villablino has large reserves of bituminous coal. The town is located about 67 km (42 mi) north of Ponferrada. The road between the two runs alongside the River Sil and has several collieries on either side. Two of the four coal-fired power stations in the autonomous community of Castile and León are adjacent to this road, the northernmost one being at Anllares del Sil, just south of Villablino.

== Toponymy ==
The origin of the name "Villablino" is unclear. The town may have been called after the Roman general Pliny who was outlawed from Rome and installed himself here with his family and retainers in the San Mames (Las Rozas). Alternatively, it may have been named after the Roman patrician, "Flacus", whose name would derive progressively to the term "Territory Platiano" and "Flaciana". Some authorities think it comes from the Celtic term "Allt Cean" or "fortified hill".

== See also ==
- Kingdom of León
- Laciana
- Leonese language
