= Laciana =

Coordinates: 42°55′N 6°19′W

Location of the comarca in León Province.

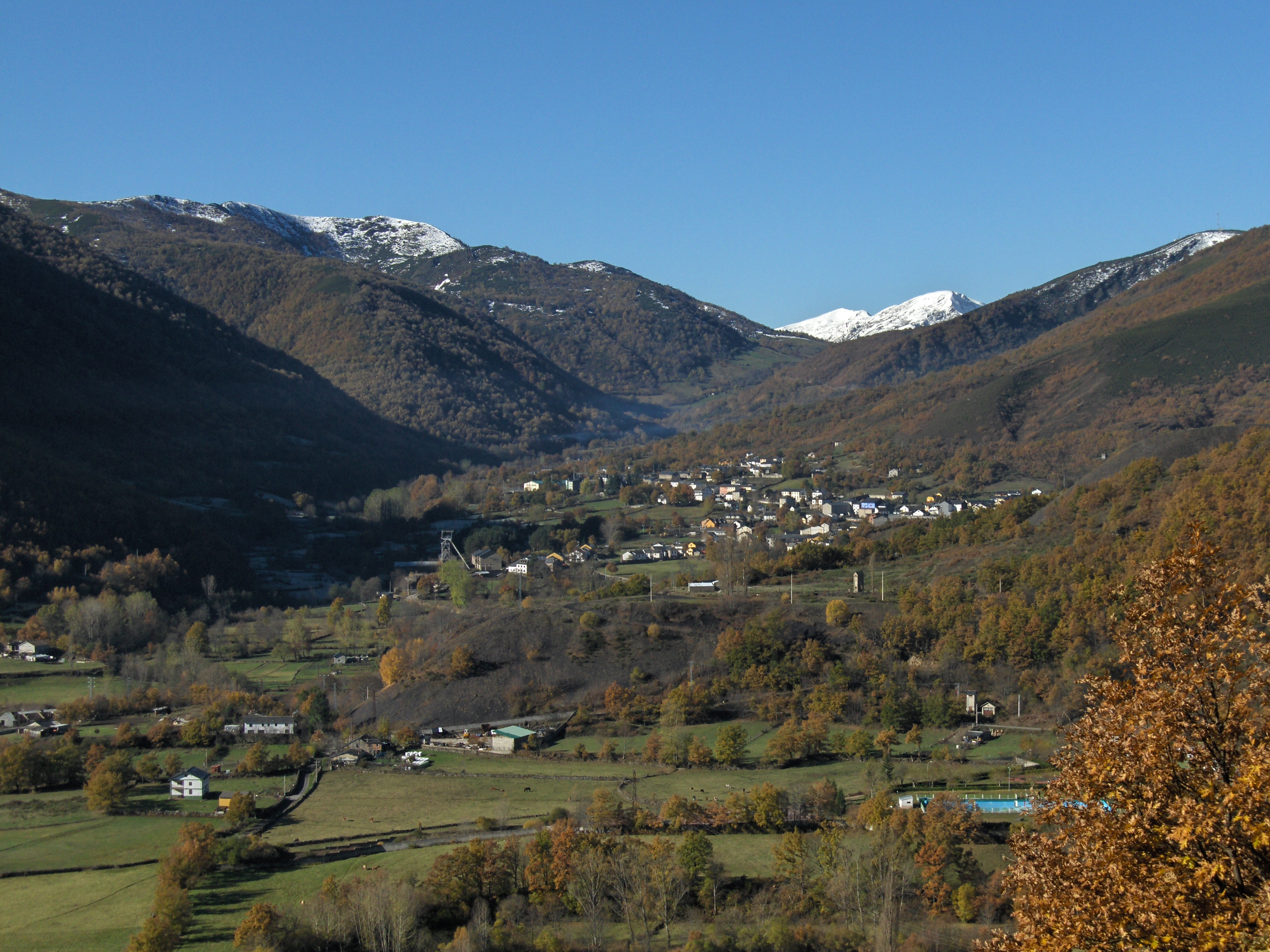
View of Caboalles de Abajo, Laciana comarca.

Laciana, Ḷḷaciana in Leonese language (also written Tsaciana), is a comarca in the province of León, Spain. It had 11,904 inhabitants in 2005. The rivers of this comarca flow towards the Atlantic Ocean. Local people speak a certain variant of the Leonese language known as Patsuezo.

Many areas in Laciana were degraded in the past by open-pit mining and mining-related contamination. This comarca was declared a Biosphere Reserve in 2003.

== Language ==

The predominant language is Castilian which coexists with the native Leon variant known as the Patsuezu language. Despite being endangered, there are various efforts being made to revitalize the traditional dialect of the area. A book entitled Street Cries of the Villablino Festivals by Emilce Núñez was written about these efforts.

== Economy ==
The region is an eminently mining region that has been hit by the economic crisis. Now it is committed to finding economic alternatives for the future. It is the headquarters of the steel mining companies Ponferrada, 8 HCCSA and 9 HBG (Hijos de Baldomero Garcia Viloria Group.

== Biological reserve ==
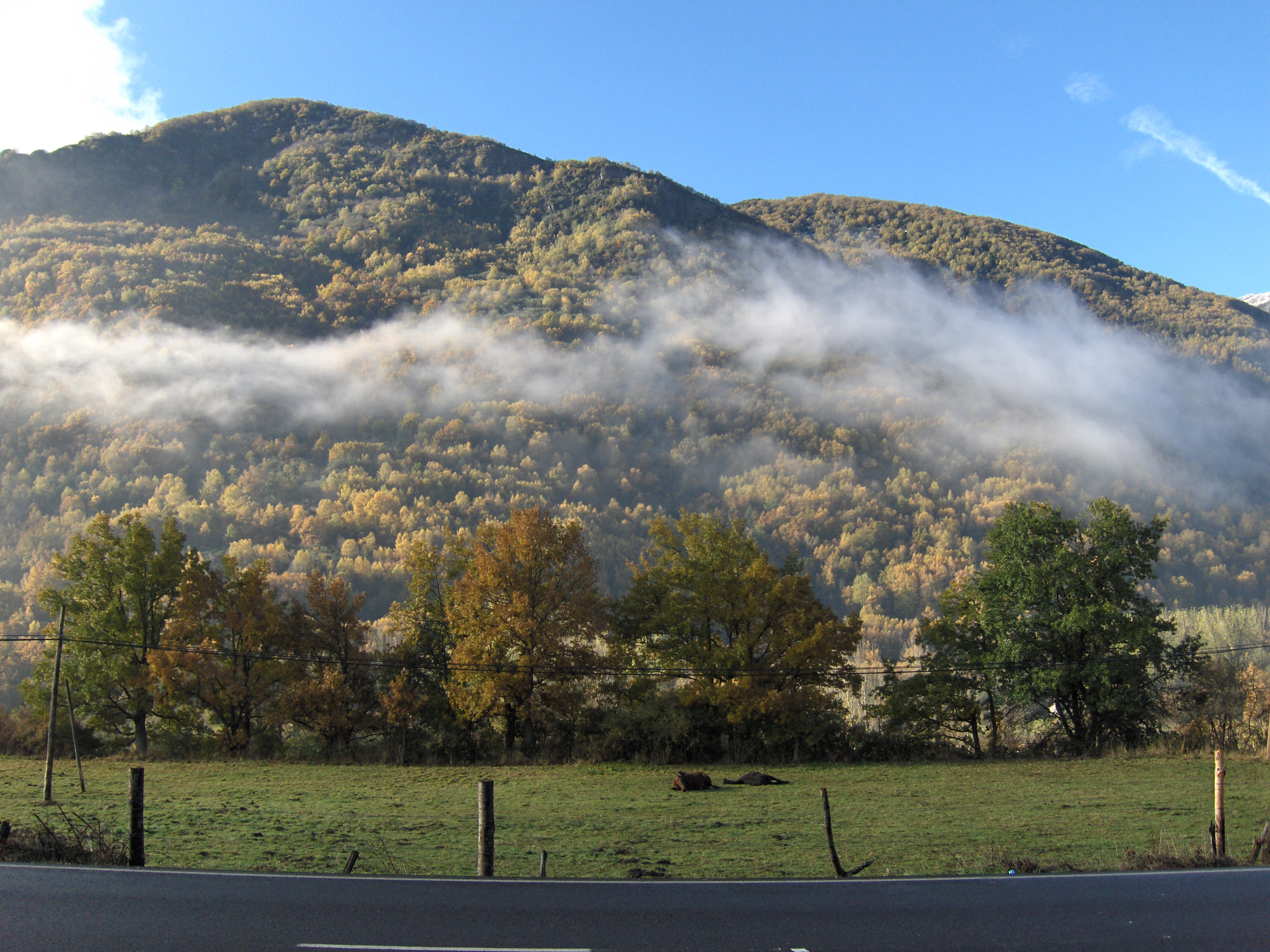
Laciana

On July 10, 2003, Laciana Valley was officially declared a Biosphere Reserve.

Furthermore, the Laciana Biosphere Reserve Laciana is included within the project Plan of Natural Resources Management of the Natural Area Sierra de Ancares to extend the area of involvement due to the size of the populations of grouse and bear.

The biosphere reserve of Laciana includes 21,700 hectares of the region, divided into several zones according to their ecological interest:

== Municipalities ==
Villablino is the main municipality. It has the following villages within its term:

- Villaseca de Laciana ^{es}
- Caboalles de Abajo
- Caboalles de Arriba
- Villager de Laciana
- Orallo
- Rioscuro de Laciana
- Robles de Laciana
- Sosas de Laciana
- Lumajo
- Villar de Laciana
- Rabanal de Abajo
- Rabanal de Arriba
- Llamas de Laciana
