= Babia, Spain =

Comarca in León, Spain

Babia
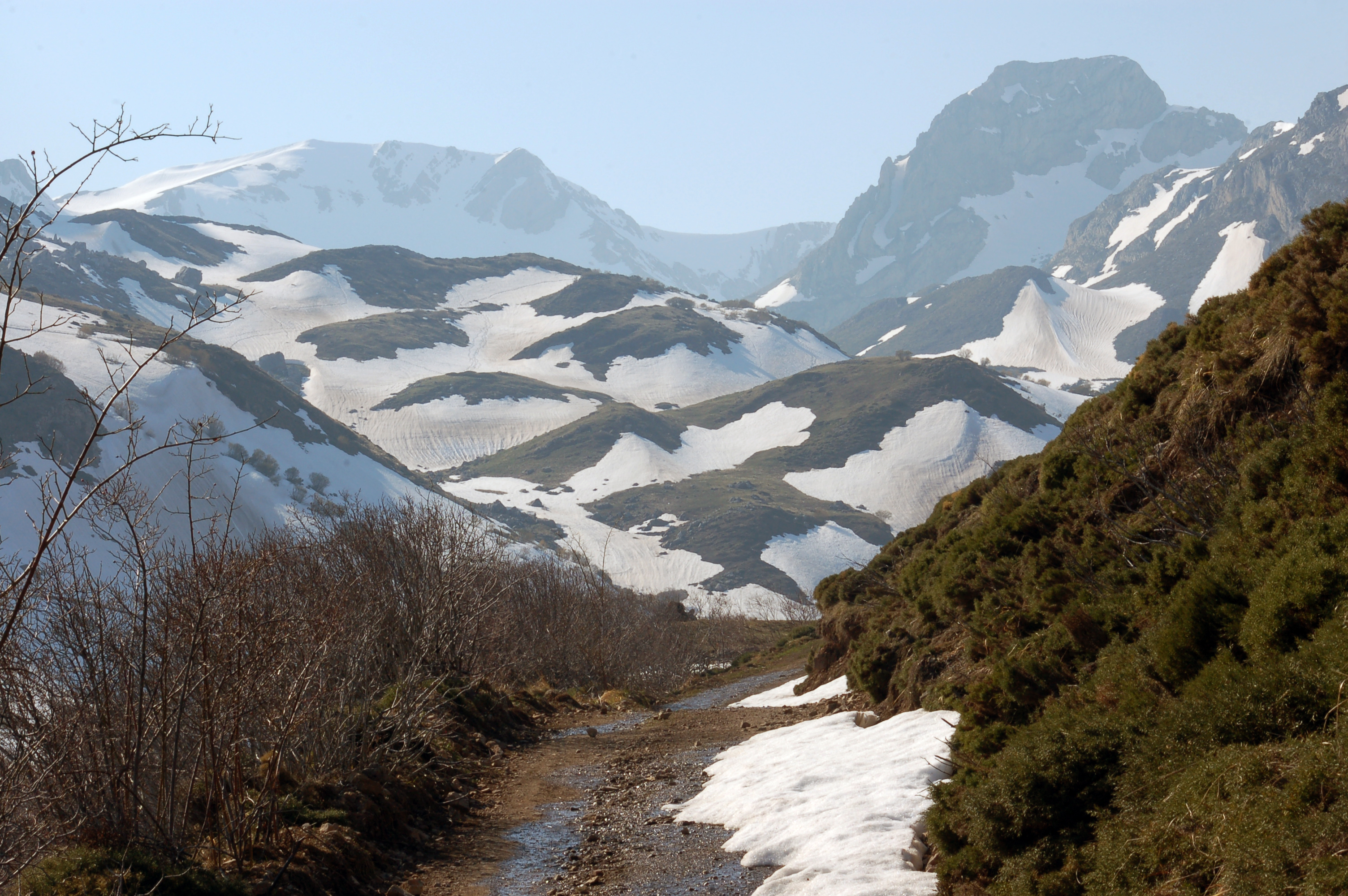
- Interactive map of Babia
- Coordinates: 42°57′50″N 6°04′33″W L
- Country: Spain
- Autonomous Community: Castile and León
- Province of Spain: León

Area
  - Total: 380 km^{2} (150 sq mi)

Population
  - Total: 1,666
  - Density: 4.4/km^{2} (11/sq mi)
- Time zone: GMT+2

Babia is a comarca in the León province, Spain. It is divided into municipalities of Cabrillanes and San Emiliano. In 2004, it was declared a Biosphere reserve.

== Etymology ==
The place name derives from medieval Latin in the form Vadabia. Philologists understand that it is a word with origins in the Basque word Ur, water, like Puente Orugo.

== Municipalities ==
Municipality	Population	Area(km^{2})	Density
Cabrillanes	855	169.16	5.82
San Emiliano	691	210.73	3.24

Historically, Babia region was divided into :

- Babia de Abajo, Babia Baja, or Babia de Yuso (from the Latin *deorsum*), now the municipality of San Emiliano.
- Babia de Arriba, Babia Alta, or Babia de Suso (from the Latin *sursum* or *sussum*), now the municipality of Cabrillanes.

== Linguistics ==
In addition to Spanish, Babia speaks a variety of the Leonese language: "Patxuezu", pronounced with the "/che vaqueira/"; although its writing depends on the area in which it is spoken. This language belongs to the linguistic set of the Asturleonese language which today is in frank disuse in the region.

== "estar en Babia" ==
In Spain, "estar en Babia" (lit. 'being in Babia') means being absent-minded, distracted or unreachable.

According to a widespread belief, the monarchs of León would holiday in the town. When asked of the whereabouts of the absent monarch, a reply would be "he is in Babia”. Over the centuries, the phrase came to mean being in the clouds or absent-minded. But there is no proof or evidence to support anything like Babia was a royal playground, let alone that the king neglected his duties in Babia.

Another belief is that, at the end of summer, shepherds would migrate with their livestock to Extremadura. Sitting around the fire at night, it was common for a shepherd to feel homesick for their native region, until a companion would approach them and say, “¡eh, despierta que estás en Babia!” (hey, wake up, you're in Babia!), because their mind “estaba en Babia” (was in Babia).
