= List of amphibians of Europe =

This is a list of amphibians of Europe. It includes all amphibians currently found in Europe. It does not include species found only in captivity or extinct in Europe, except where there is some doubt about this, nor does it currently include species introduced in recent decades. Each species is listed, with its binomial name and notes on its distribution where this is limited.

Summary of 2006 IUCN Red List categories.

Conservation status - IUCN Red List of Threatened Species:

EX - Extinct, EW - Extinct in the wild
CR - Critically endangered, EN - Endangered, VU - Vulnerable
NT - Near threatened, LC - Least concern
DD - Data deficient, NE - Not evaluated
(v. 2013.2, the data is current as of March 5, 2014)

== Salamanders ==
Family: Salamandridae (true salamanders and newts)

- Fire salamander, Salamandra salamandra LC
- Penibetic salamander, Salamandra longirostris (Spain)
- Corsican fire salamander, Salamandra corsica LC (Corsica)
- Alpine salamander, Salamandra atra LC (France, the Alps, and Balkans)
- Lanza's alpine salamander, Salamandra lanzai VU
- Karpathos salamander, Lyciasalamandra helverseni VU (three Greek islands near Crete)
- Luschan's salamander, Lyciasalamandra luschani VU (Greek island of Kastellorizo)
- Gold-striped salamander, Chioglossa lusitanica VU (Spain and Portugal)
- Spectacled salamander, Salamandrina terdigitata LC (Italy) and: (Note: Species split from this species or considered as distinct species alternatively. All these taxa occur in the area of interest, including the one on the left.)

- Salamandrina perspicillata LC (formerly in Salamandrina terdigitata, Italy)

- Iberian ribbed newt, Pleurodeles waltl NT (Iberian Peninsula, Morocco)
- Pyrenean brook salamander, Calotriton asper NT (Pyrenees)
- Montseny brook newt, Calotriton arnoldi CR (Spain)
- Corsican brook salamander, Euproctus montanus LC (Corsica)
- Sardinian brook salamander, Euproctus platycephalus EN (Sardinia)
- Northern crested newt, Triturus cristatus LC
- Marbled newt, Triturus marmoratus LC (Spain, Portugal and France)
- Southern marbled newt, Triturus pygmaeus NT (Spain and Portugal)
- Italian crested newt, Triturus carnifex LC
- Southern crested newt, Triturus karelinii LC
- Balkan crested newt, Triturus ivanbureschi (Balkans, Turkey)
- Macedonian crested newt, Triturus macedonicus (Balkans, Turkey)
- Danube crested newt, Triturus dobrogicus NT
- Banded newt, Ommatotriton ophryticus (Caucasus, Turkey) NT
- Alpine newt, Mesotriton alpestris and:

- Ichthyosaura apuana (Italy, France)
- Ichthyosaura reiseri (Balkans, Romania)
- Ichthyosaura veluchiensis (Balkans)

- Carpathian newt, Lissotriton montandoni LC (Carpathians)
- Smooth newt, Lissotriton vulgaris LC and:

- Greek smooth newt, Lissotriton graecus (Balkans)
- Smooth newt, Lissotriton meridionalis (Italy, Slovenia, and Croatia)
- Schmidtler's smooth newt, Lissotriton schmidtleri (Turkey, Greece, Bulgaria)
- Caucasian smooth newt, Lissotriton lantzi (Caucasus)

- Bosca's newt, Lissotriton boscai (Portugal) LC
- Palmate newt, Lissotriton helveticus LC
- Italian newt, Lissotriton italicus LC

Family: Hynobiidae (Asiatic salamanders)

- Siberian salamander, Salamandrella keyserlingii LC (Russia)

Family: Plethodontidae (lungless salamanders)

- Cave salamander, Speleomantes strinatii NT (France)
- Brown cave salamander, Hydromantes genei VU (France and Italy)
- Italian cave salamander, Speleomantes italicus NT (Italy)
- Ambrosi's cave salamander, Speleomantes ambrosii NT (Italy)
- Monte Albo cave salamander, Speleomantes flavus VU (Sardinia)
- Imperial cave salamander, Speleomantes imperialis NT (Sardinia) and:

- Speleomantes sarrabusensis VU (formerly in Speleomantes imperialis, Sardinia)

- Supramonte cave salamander, Speleomantes supramontis EN (Sardinia)

Family: Proteidae (waterdogs and mudpuppies)

- Olm, Proteus anguinus VU (Dinaric Alps)

== Frogs and toads ==
Family: Bombinatoridae (fire-bellied toads)

- European fire-bellied toad, Bombina bombina LC
- Apennine yellow-bellied toad, Bombina pachypus EN
- Yellow-bellied toad, Bombina variegata LC

Family: Discoglossidae (disc-tongued frogs)

- Iberian painted frog, Discoglossus galganoi LC
- Spanish painted frog, Discoglossus jeanneae NT
- Corsican painted frog, Discoglossus montalentii NT
- Painted frog, Discoglossus pictus LC (Sicily and Malta)
- Tyrrhenian painted frog, Discoglossus sardus LC
- Midwife toad, Alytes obstetricans LC and:

- Catalonian midwife toad, Alytes (obstetricans) almogavarii (Spain)

- Iberian midwife toad, Alytes cisternasii NT
- Betic midwife toad, Alytes dickhilleni VU (Spain)
- Majorcan midwife toad, Alytes muletensis VU (Mallorca)

Family: Pipidae

- African clawed frog, Xenopus laevis LC (introduced)

Family: Pelobatidae (European spadefoot toads)

- Eastern spadefoot, Pelobates syriacus LC (south-eastern Europe) and:

- Balkan spadefoot, Pelobates balcanicus (southern Europe)

- Western spadefoot, Pelobates cultripes NT
- Common spadefoot, Pelobates fuscus LC and:

- Pallas' spadefoot toad, Pelobates vespertinus (Ukraine to Kazakhstan)

- Common parsley frog, Pelodytes punctatus LC
- Iberian parsley frog, Pelodytes ibericus LC (Iberian Peninsula)
- Lusitanian parsley frog, Pelodytes atlanticus LC (Portugal)
- Caucasian parsley frog, Pelodytes caucasicus NT (Caucasus region, Turkey)
- Hesperides' parsley frog, Pelodytes hespericus (Spain)

Family: Bufonidae (true toads)

- Common toad, Bufo bufo LC
- Giant toad, Bufo spinosus (Iberian Peninsula, France, Jersey)
- Caucasian toad, Bufo verrucosissimus NT (Caucasus, Turkey, Iran)
- Natterjack toad, Bufo calamita LC
- Berber toad, Bufo mauritanicus LC (Spain - introduced)
- Former Bufo viridis group:

- European green toad, Bufotes viridis LC (in the past Pseudepidalea (Bufo) viridis, most of Europe) and:
- Variable green toad, Bufotes sitibundus (Caucasus region, Russia, Kazakhstan)
- Balearic green toad, Bufotes balearicus LC (Italy, Mediterranean islands)
- Varying toad, Bufotes variabilis DD (currently not recognized, northern Europe, Greece, Caucasus region)
- African green toad, Bufotes boulengeri LC (Lampedusa) and:

- Sicilian green toad, Bufotes (boulengeri) siculus LC (Sicilia, Favignana and Ustica)

- Cyprus green toad, Bufotes cypriensis (Cyprus)

Family: Hylidae (tree frogs and their allies)

- Common tree frog, Hyla arborea LC
- Oriental tree frog, Hyla orientalis (eastern Europe, Turkey, Iran)
- Italian tree frog, Hyla intermedia LC and:

- Po's tree frog, Hyla perrini (southern Europe)

- Stripeless tree frog, Hyla meridionalis LC (southern Europe)
- Iberian tree frog, Hyla molleri (Iberian Peninsula, France)
- Sardinian tree frog, Hyla sarda LC

Family: Ranidae (true frogs)

Typical frogs
- Common frog, Rana temporaria LC and:

- Rana parvipalmata (Spain)

- Pyrenean frog, Rana pyrenaica EN
- Moor frog, Rana arvalis LC
- Agile frog, Rana dalmatina LC
- Italian agile frog, Rana latastei VU
- Italian stream frog, Rana italica LC
- Greek stream frog, Rana graeca LC
- Iberian frog, Rana iberica NT
- Long-legged wood frog, Rana macrocnemis LC (Caucasus region, Turkey)
Water frogs
- Marsh frog, Pelophylax ridibundus LC
- Pool frog, Pelophylax lessonae LC
- Edible frog, Pelophylax kl. esculentus LC
- Perez's frog, Pelophylax perezi LC
- Graf's hybrid frog, Pelophylax kl. grafi NT
- Italian pool frog, Pelophylax bergeri LC
- Italian edible frog, Pelophylax kl. hispanicus LC (Italy)
- Epirus water frog, Pelophylax epeiroticus VU
- Albanian water frog, Pelophylax shqipericus EN
- Karpathos frog, Pelophylax cerigensis EN (Greece)
- Cretan frog, Pelophylax cretensis EN (Greece)
- Cyprus water frog, Pelophylax cypriensis (Cyprus)
- Balkan frog, Pelophylax kurtmuelleri LC
- Levant water frog, Pelophylax bedriagae LC
- Sahara frog, Pelophylax saharicus LC (Gran Canaria - introduced)
- American bullfrog, Lithobates catesbeianus LC (introduced)

== See also ==
- List of birds of Europe
- List of mammals of Europe
- List of reptiles of Europe
- List of extinct animals of Europe
- List of amphibians and reptiles of Cantabria
