= List of amphibians and reptiles of Cantabria =

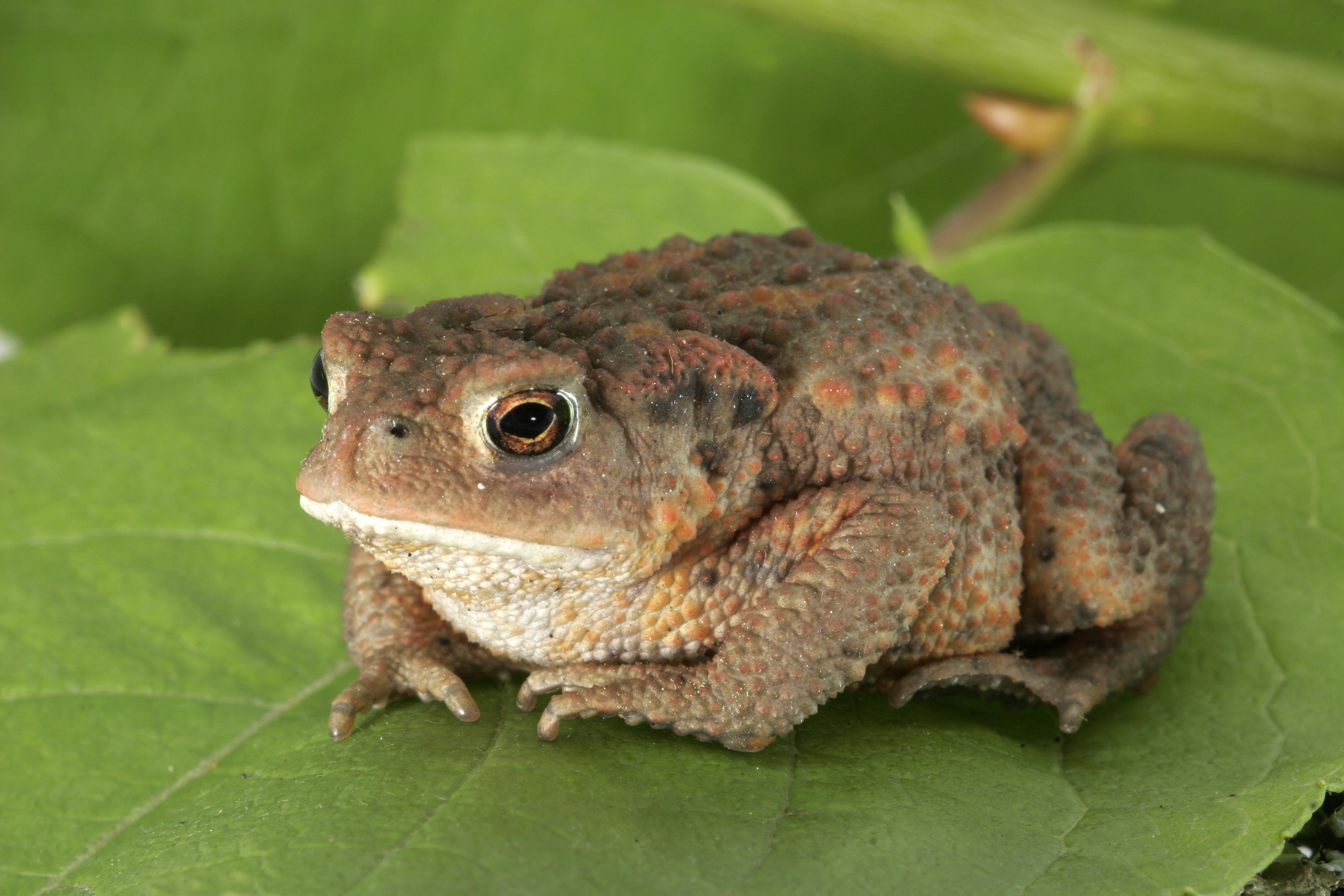
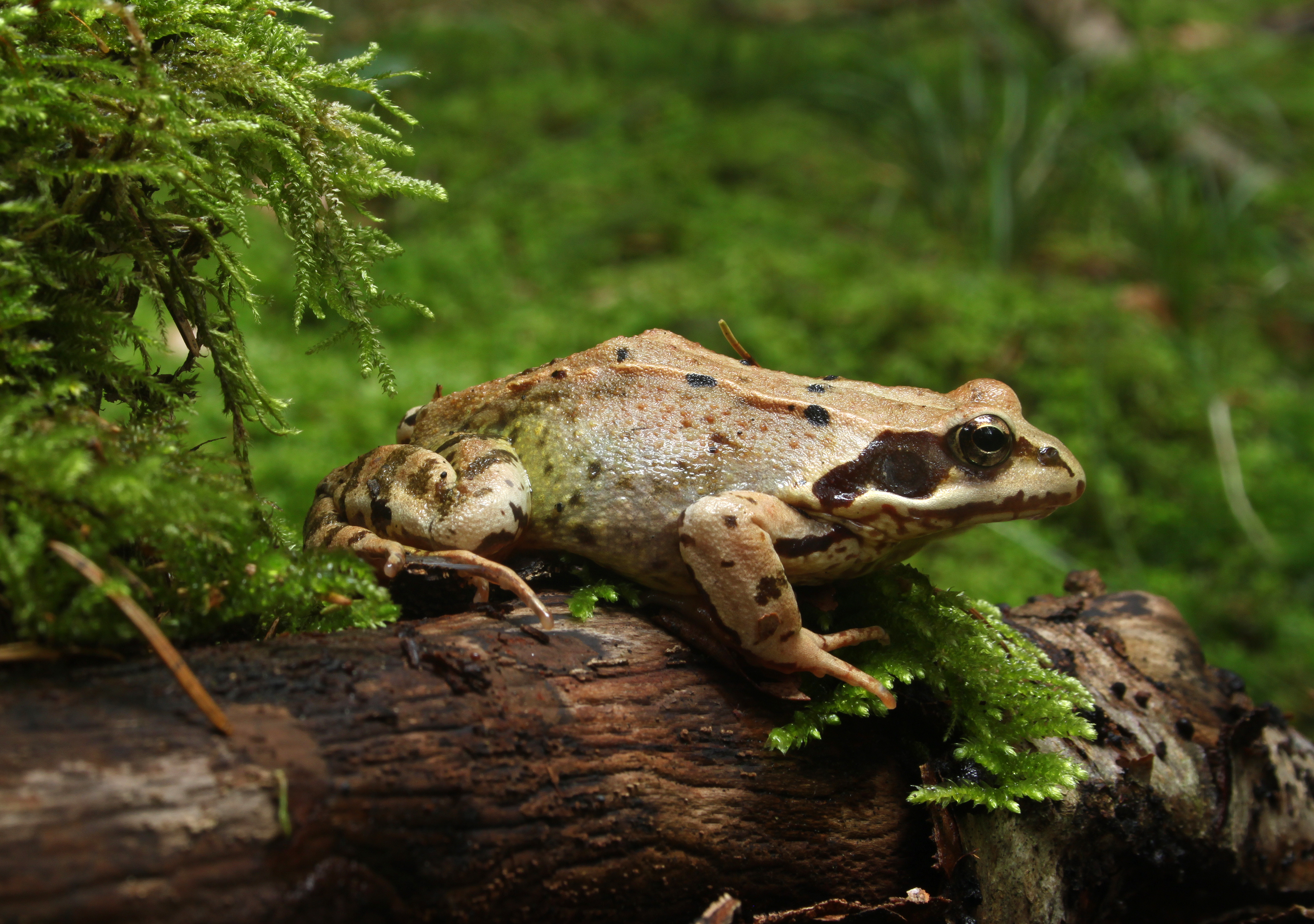
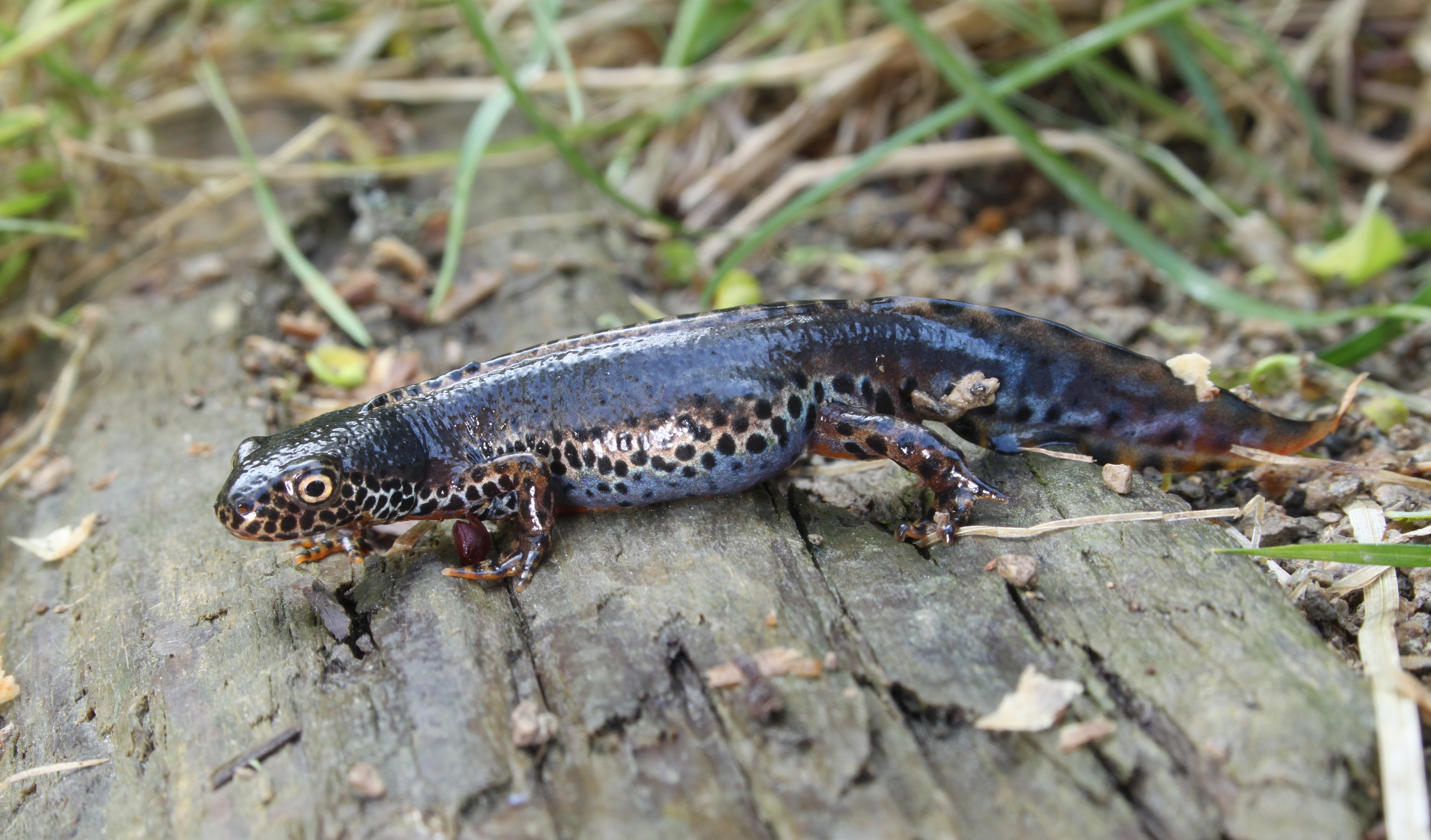
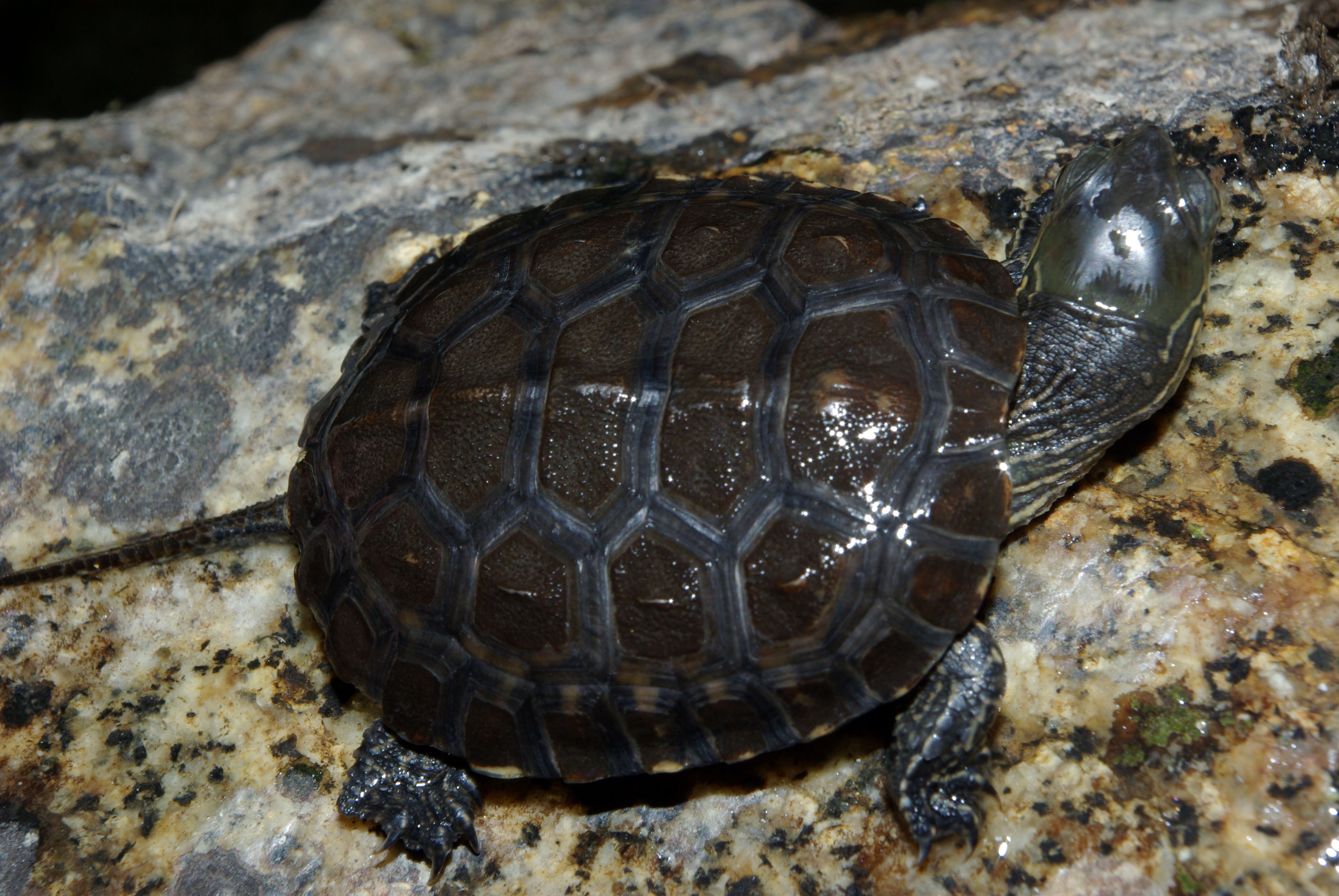
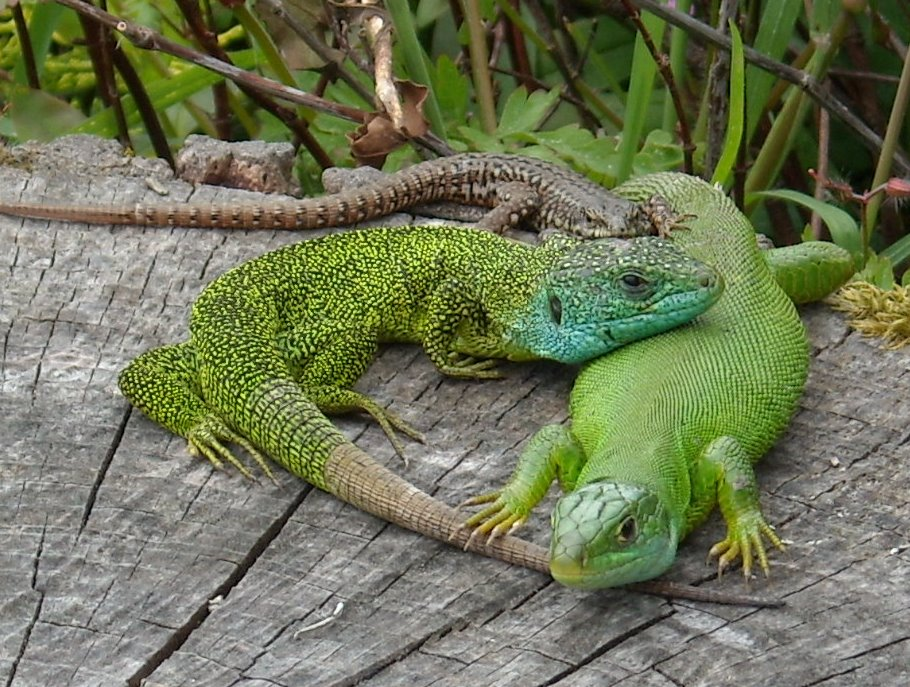
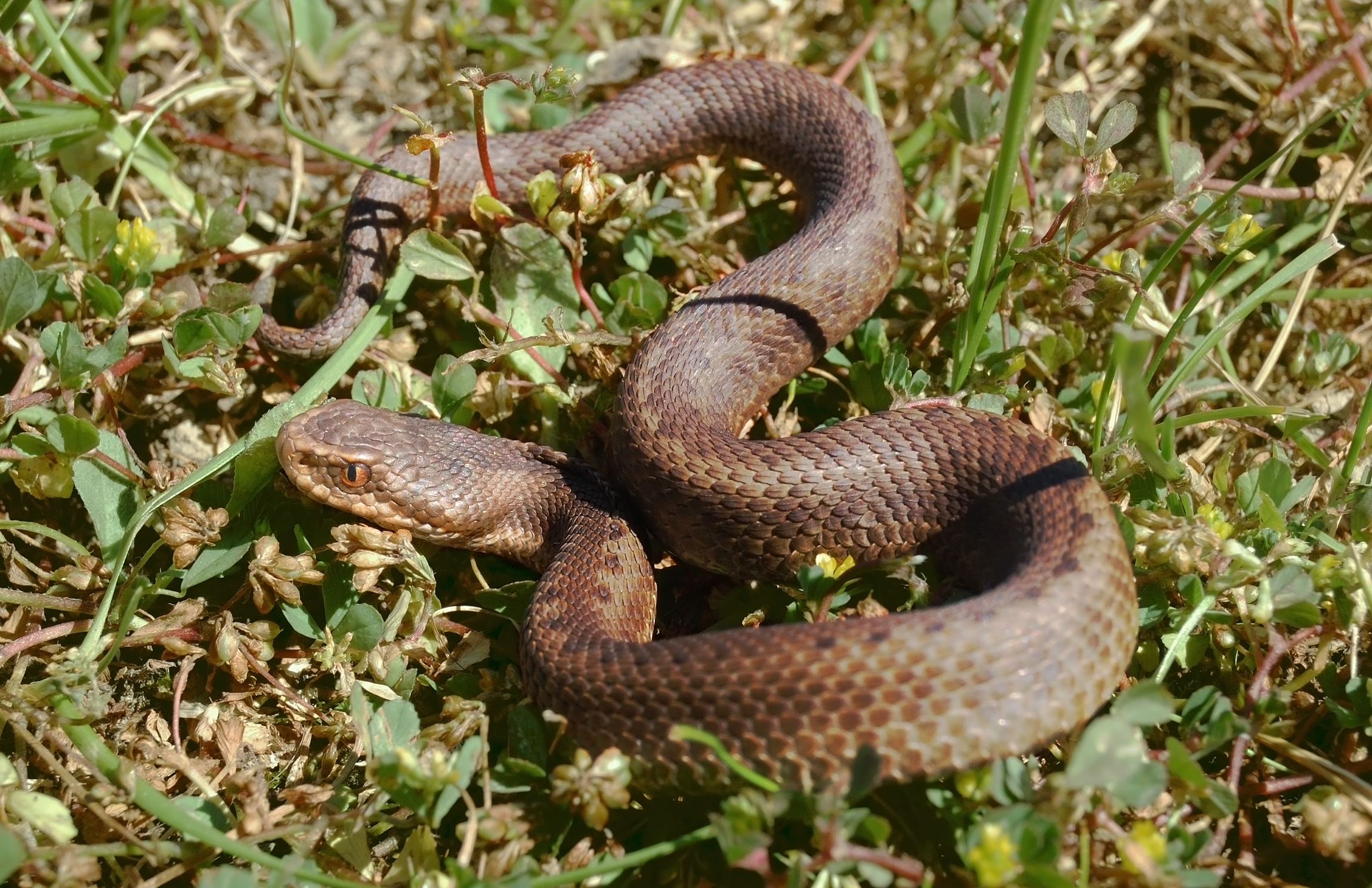
From left to right and from top to bottom: Bufo bufo, Rana temporaria, Ichthyosaura alpestris, Mauremys leprosa, Lacerta bilineata and Vipera seoanei.

The vertebrate fauna in Cantabria presents a wide diversity due to the variety of ecological niches existing in the region and its geographical position, equidistant between the Mediterranean region of the south of the peninsula and the nearby Atlantic Europe.

These lists include all the wild vertebrates living in Cantabria, classified according to the genus and family they belong to. In addition to the scientific name of each species, the common name in the Spanish language, the vernacular names most commonly used in this region, a brief description, a map of distribution in Spain and the conservation status are also included.

The herpetofauna of Cantabria is composed of a significant number of species. Some of them are Iberian endemisms, such as the Iberian painted frog, the Moller's tree frog, the Iberian frog, the gold-striped salamander, the Bedriaga's skink, the Iberian rock lizard, the Iberian emerald lizard and the Baskian viper, while others, such as the red-eared slider, the Italian wall lizard, the gecko or the Tenerife gecko are species introduced by people. Their distribution is variable; from species such as the common toad or the viperine snake, found throughout the region, to others such as the Italian wall lizard or the gold-striped salamander, which are very difficult to spot.

== Amphibian ==
In Cantabria there are fifteen species of amphibians of the Anura and Caudata orders, all of them intimately linked to the aquatic environments: wetlands, mountain rivers, seasonal ponds, lakes, lagoons, lagoons, coastal lagoons, marshes, and others, where they spend all or part of their lives. The families represented are: Alytidae, Bufonidae, Hylidae, Pelodytidae, Ranidae and Salamandridae. Some of these species are widely distributed, such as the fire salamander, the alpine newt or the midwife toad, while others, such as the parsley frog or the Iberian frog, are very scarce or, in the case of the gold-striped salamander, practically non-existent.

In relation to conservation, amphibian populations in Cantabria, as in the rest of the world, are suffering a marked decline, mainly due to habitat loss, diseases and climate change.

=== Anura order ===
Anurans, commonly known as frogs and toads, are characterized (in their adult phase) by their compact body, lacking tails and possessing highly developed hind legs, adapted for jumping. Five families are found in Cantabria, comprising ten species.

Alytidae Fitzinger, 1843
Species	Common and vernacular name (VN) (Note: The vernacular name refers to the traditional name of the species in Cantabria. The main references for vernacular names are, unless otherwise indicated in the table, El lenguaje popular de la Cantabria Montañesa and the vocabulary section of the book El dialecto cabuérnigo.)	Distribution	Description (Note: The following codes are used: L: Length without tail; Lt: Length with tail; T: Length of tail; W: Weight; When there is variability in the measurements, the most common range is indicated separated by a hyphen and in parentheses, the punctual records that are out of that range.)	Status (Note: Conservation status of the species at the Spanish State level according to the Atlas and Red Books: EX : Extinct; EW : Extinct in the wild (only in captivity); CR : Critically endangered; EN : Endangered; VU : Vulnerable; NT : Near threatened; LC : Least concern; DD : Data deficient)	Image
Alytes obstetricans	Common midwife toad	Frequent throughout the region.	L: 5 cm Toad of small size, bulky appearance and large head. The skin is granular with small warts grouped on the sides. Its coloration varies from gray to brown with green, reddish and black spots not very marked; the ventral area is light. Males carry eggs on their backs.	NT	
Discoglossus galganoi	Iberian painted frog	Scarce and irregularly distributed.	L: 4.5-7.5 cm Toad with flattened head, almost as long as wide, and pointed snout. The skin is smooth or with small granulations of very variable coloration, ranging from brownish, pinkish, greenish or almost black.	LC	
Bufonidae Gray, 1825
Bufo bufo	Common toad VN: Common to all the toads (Spanish): Sapo, quico.	Regular presence in the whole region	L: 8-13 cm Body covered with wart-like protuberances. The color of its skin varies between a wide range of brownish, grayish and greenish tones. Its eyes are orange. It presents a marked sexual dimorphism, females are much larger than males.	LC	
Epidalea calamita	Natterjack toad		L: 5-6(9) cm Of robust appearance and large hind legs, it is distinguished from the common toad by a yellow stripe along the column. They have a strange gait.	LC	
Hylidae Rafinesque, 1815
Hyla arborea	European tree frog	Habitual in coastal areas.	L: 4.5-5 cm Easily recognizable by their intense bright green color. With a broad head, large eyes and slender limbs adapted to jumping, they have lines ranging from brown to black drawn along the sides.	VU	
Hyla molleri	Iberian tree frog	Habitual in coastal areas.	L: 3.5-5 cmSmall climbing frog with smooth, generally green skin, often seen climbing phragmites and other riparian vegetation. As they begin to croak when rain is approaching, it was formerly used as a barometer.	LC	
Pelodytidae Bonaparte, 1850
Pelodytes punctatus	Common parsley frog		L: 4.5 cm It has elongated warts on the back, often in rows along the body.	LC	
Ranidae Rafinesque, 1814
Pelophylax perezi	Iberian waterfrog NV: (in Spanish) Ranu (young frog).	Present in non-mountainous areas.	L: 8 (11) cm Skin is green and brown very variable in color, with black spots and a lighter green dorsal line and without the characteristic temporal spot of brown frogs. The belly is grayish in color.	LC	
Rana iberica	Iberian frog		L: 3-6 cm Mountain frog with a reddish-brown color. Found in streams and pools of cold water on rocky substrate and among riparian vegetation.	VU	
Rana temporaria	Common frog NV: (in Spanish) Rana de los prados.		L: 6-9 cm Despite its name, its coloration can vary between reddish-brown, ochre and greenish tones. It lives on land and returns to the water for shelter and reproduction.	LC	

=== Caudata order ===
Unlike anurans, the caudates have an elongated body with a tail, both in the larval and adult stages. This order is represented in the region by five species: Ichthyosaura alpestris, Chioglossa lusitanica, Lissotriton helveticus, Salamandra salamandra and Triturus marmoratus. Two of them, Ichthyosaura alpestris and Lissotriton helveticus, are only found in Spain, in the northern fringe.

Species	Common and vernacular name (VN)	Distribution	Description	Status	Image
Salamandridae Goldfuss, 1820
Ichthyosaura alpestris	Alpine newt	Scarce in the whole region.	Lt. <11 cm One of the smallest aurodeles in Europe. The male has a unique coloring during the mating season.	VU	
Chioglossa lusitanica	Gold-striped salamander		Lt: 13 (16) cm It is distinguished from all other species of Iberian aurodeles by the size of its tail, which exceeds that of the rest of the body. It is endemic to the Iberian Peninsula.	VU	
Lissotriton helveticus	Palmate newt	Present in the whole region.	Lt: < 9 cm The smallest of the Iberian newts. Brownish back with spots, white throat and yellow belly. Its common name is due to the interdigital membranes of the hind legs.	LC	
Salamandra salamandra	Fire salamander NV: (in Spanish) Vicaruela, bicaruelu, vacariza, escurpión, mamavacas.		Lt: 18-25 cm Quite common species with characteristic yellow spots on a black background. Thick body and relatively short tail, without dorsal or caudal crest.	NT	
Triturus marmoratus	Marbled newt	Sparse and scarce throughout the region.	Lt: 15-16 cm Its green coloration distinguishes it from other European newts. During the breeding season, the green becomes more vivid and the male acquires a large dorsal crest dotted with white, black and orange vertical stripes.	LC	

== Reptiles ==
Reptiles originated from amphibians in the Carboniferous period, being the first animals to possess well-developed lungs. They are characterized by a tough and generally scaly skin. In Cantabria there are two orders of reptiles: Testudines (turtles and chelonians) and Squamata (squamates), which group together twenty-seven different reptile species.

=== Testudines Order ===
Known as turtles or chelonians, the species of the order Testudines are characterized by a short, broad trunk and a carapace or shell that protects the internal organs of the body. The carapace has a head and front legs at the front and hind legs and a tail at the back.

Species	Common and vernacular name (VN)	Distribution	Description	Status	Image
Cheloniidae Oppel, 1811
Caretta caretta	Loggerhead sea turtle		W: 65-107 kg L: 82-109 cm They have fins with two claws, large round head with a very thick beak. The carapace is smooth in adults and dark brown to orange-yellow in color. In juveniles it is dark brown and rougher. The back is a cream color.		
Lepidochelys kempii	Kemp's ridley sea turtle		W: 45 kg L: 61-91 cm Turtle with a greenish-gray carapace and a greenish-yellow and white breastplate. Like other sea turtles, it has a corneous beak.		
Dermochelyidae Fitzinger, 1843
Dermochelys coriacea	Leather back sea turtle		L: up to 270 cm It is the largest of all turtles. Its carapace, smooth and dark, is formed by a smooth connective tissue delimited by a soft curve that gives a semi-cylindrical appearance to the animal. It has seven ridges running from head to tail. Front flippers are much longer than in all other turtles. Hook-shaped beak.		
Geoemydidae Theobald, 1868
Mauremys leprosa	Ibearian pond turtle		L: 15 (20) cm Carapace flattened, with the vertebral keel slightly prominent, green, brown or brown. Yellow plastron, sometimes with black spots. It has orange or reddish lines on the neck.	VU	
Emydidae Rafinesque, 1815
Trachemys scripta elegans	Red-eared slider		L: 12-20 (40) cm Green or brownish carapace and light yellow plastron. They have characteristic red or yellow spots at the back of the eyes. Females are slightly larger than males.		

=== Squamata order ===
The Squamata order includes lizards, chameleons, iguanas, serpents and snakes among others. Evolutionarily, it is the most recent order of reptiles and the one that has achieved the greatest ecological success, due, among other qualities, to the presence of a kinetic skull that facilitates the swallowing of prey. Twenty-two species are found in Cantabria, grouped into six families: Scincidae, Lacertidae, Gekkonidae, Anguidae, Colubridae and Viperidae. Some, such as the Iberian rock lizard (Iberolacerta monticola) or the Seoanei viper (Vipera seoanei) are endemic to the north of the peninsula, while others, such as the Italian wall lizard (Podarcis sicula), the common wall gecko (Tarentola mauritanica) or the Tenerife gecko (Tarentola delalandii), have been introduced by people.

Species	Common name and vernacular name (VN)	Distribution	Description	Status	Imagen
Scincidae Gray, 1825
Chalcides bedriagai	Bedriaga's skink NV: (in Spanish) Eslabón, enano, nánago, enánago, inano, ánago, anagón.		Small sized lizard, with a small, triangular, broadened head and rounded snout. Short and thick body with rounded or quadrangular section, covered with smooth and shiny scales. Small limbs, tail of circular section of lesser length than the body.	NT	
Chalcides striatus	Western three-toed skink NV: (in Spanish) Eslabón, enano, nánago, enánago, inano, ánago, anagón.		Very similar to the Bedriaga's skink, whose main difference is that it has only three toes on each limb.	LC	
Lacertidae Gray, 1825
Iberolacerta monticola	Iberian rock lizard		Medium-sized lizard, robust appearance and relatively flattened head. The back is brownish or bright green with black reticulation, the belly is whitish, bluish or greenish-yellow with black spots. Blue axial ocelli.	NT	
Timon lepidus	Ocellated lizard NV: (in Spanish, common to all lizards) Legarto/u, regartezón.		L: 22.5 cm. Lt: 75.5 cm; 59.4 cm (female). It is the largest Iberian lizard. Its layer is yellowish green in males and brownish in females, in both mottled in black. On the sides they have blue ocelli that may or may not be framed in black. Their underside is whitish. Juveniles are usually greenish with white ocelli on the back and sides.	LC	
Lacerta schreiberi	Iberian emerald lizard		Lt: 40 cm Short and wide head, the tail is twice as long as the body and its belly is yellowish. Males are green vermiculated in black, with age the black decreases. During estrus, their head and throat turn blue. Females have a brownish or greenish coloration.	NT	
Lacerta bilineata	Western green lizard		L: 12 cm Coat yellowish green, bluish green or brownish green with black speckles. Males have a blue throat and females and juveniles have 2 dark longitudinal stripes.	LC	
Zootoca vivipara	Viviparous lizard NV: (in Spanish, common to all lizards) Lagartesa, ligartesa, lagarteza, ligaterna, legaterna, regarteza.		L: 6.5 cm; 7.5 cm (female) They have a long tail, between 1.1 and 2.5 times the length of the body. They are brownish or grayish in color with dark and light longitudinal stripes. Juveniles are usually completely blackish.	NT	
Podarcis hispanicus	Iberian wall lizard		L: 4.2-5.9 (6.5) cm; 4.1-5.7 cm (female). T: 10 cm Color greenish-brown very variable, with yellowish chest and occasionally reddish head and back. It has spots in males and lateral stripes in females, among which stand out two thick and dark ones that may be outlined by other thinner yellowish ones.	LC	
Podarcis muralis	Common wall lizard		L: 7.7 cm; 7 cm (female) A slender lizard with a brownish or grayish back and whitish belly. It has a line of dots in the center of the back and a wide, dark longitudinal stripe on the sides, flanked by two light stripes that pass above and below the eyes. Its pupils are reddish.	LC	
Podarcis sicula *	Italian wall lizard		L: (9 cm). Males have a longer tail. Green lizard with three dark longitudinal stripes, one in the center of the back and two on the sides, dotted with light ocelli.	LC DD * * In Cantabria	
Psammodromus manuelae	(In Spanish) Lagartija colilarga occidental		L: 7-7.5 cm Coloration of the back is light brown, coppery brown or olive, with two whitish or yellowish lines. Eyelids bluish on each side of the body, decreasing in size towards the back. In spring, adult males have orange and yellow sides of the head and throat, and the sides with abundant black coloration forming parallel vertical series alternating with yellow coloration.	LC	
Gekkonidae Oppel, 1811
Tarentola mauritanica*	Common wall gecko		L: 5-7 cm. T: 5-8 cm The back, legs and tail have prominent conical bumps. The head is large and broad, triangular and has large eyes with vertical pupil without eyelids. Its coloration can vary from brown to dark gray, with spots; the belly is whitish. It has five toes on each leg, with lateral and lower lamellar protuberances that provide some grip for climbing and moving along vertical surfaces.	LC	
Tarentola delalandii *	Tenerife gecko		Lt: 73 cm; 63 cm (female) A large, robust gecko with a gray dorsum with dark, inconspicuous transverse stripes followed by light spots and a whitish or yellowish underside. Its iris is yellowish or golden brown.	LC	
Anguidae Gray, 1825
Anguis fragilis	Slow worm NV: (in Spanish) Enánago, nánago/u, enanu, inanu, ánago, anagón, alamón, eslabón, cedajón, salayón, babón, gamón.		Lt: 30-40 cm; 50 cm (female) Legless lizard. Body with hard brownish scales. Movable eyelids.	LC	
Colubridae Oppel, 1811
Coronella austriaca	Smooth snake NV: (In Spanish, common to all the family) Culiebra, culiebru.		Lt: 50-60 (75) cm The color of the back varies from reddish-brown to gray, with irregular dark spots. The belly is blackish, grayish or reddish-brown in a more or less uniform pattern. A dark mask runs from the nostrils and lower edge of the eye to the neck.	LC	
Coronella girondica	Southern smooth snake		Lt: 67.7 cm; 80 cm (females) It has a small and sunken head and a relatively short tail. Its coloration varies between brown, ocher, gray, pink and reddish tones. It has two dark spots on the parietals extending backwards, its back is covered with dark transverse spots, sometimes with reddish spots on the sides.	LC	
Natrix maura	Viperine water snake		Lt: 50-70 (80) cm Coloration very varied, generally olive or yellowish brown, although it can also be reddish. It has along the mid-dorsal line a row of spots that in some specimens may come together to form a zigzag line. It is characterized by showing very carinate scales on the back.	LC	
Natrix natrix	Grass snake NV: (in Spanish) Culebra collarina, serpiente de los prados.		Lt: 120 (200) cm It has a thick body, rounded head and eyes with round pupils. The color is very variable, most commonly brown or dark green.	LC	
Zamenis longissimus	Aesculapian snake		Lt: (225) cm. Head is elongated and narrow. Brownish, greenish or grayish coloration on the back, with whitish specks on the sides. Yellow underside as well as the sides of the neck.	DD	
Viperidae Oppel, 1811
Vipera aspis	European asp viper		L: 60 (85) cm; (75) cm (female). Relatively short tail. Head broad, triangular and distinct from the neck. Body scales grayish or yellowish, golden or coppery, with black or greenish spots with black border, in apparent zigzag on the back.	LC	
Vipera latastei	Lataste's viper		Lt: 50 (70) cm. Broad back of the head and triangular muzzle ending in an upward prominence. Short tail. Its color varies from gray to brown and has a zigzag band running down the back.	NT	
Vipera seoanei	Baskian viper or Seoane's viper		L: 45-48 (75) cm Large head and flattened or slightly raised muzzle. Small tail (10-15% of the total). Notable individual and geographic variation in color pattern; the background is usually light brown but its pattern may be in a rosary pattern, zig-zag, discontinuous spots or even bilinear.	LC	

== Bibliography ==
- Fombellida, Isidoro; Ruíz Agüero, Ramón (2008). Guía de vertebrados del monte Tolío. Mortera Verde.
- García Díaz, Jesús (1995). Guía del Parque natural Saja-Besaya. Santander: Estudio. ISBN 8487934358.
- García González, Francisco (2010). "Vocabulario". El Dialecto Cabuérnigo. Torrelavega: Cantabria Tradicional, S.L. ISBN 9788496042896.
- García Lomas, Adriano (1999). El lenguaje popular de la Cantabria Montañesa. Santander: Ediciones de librería Estvdio. ISBN 8487934765.
- Pleguezuelos, J. M.; Márquez, R.; Lizana, M. (2002). Atlas y Libro Rojo de los Anfibios y Reptiles de España. Madrid: Dirección General de Conservación de la Naturaleza-Asociación Herpetologica Española. p. 587. ISBN 8480144505. Archived from the original on 2016-05-25.
