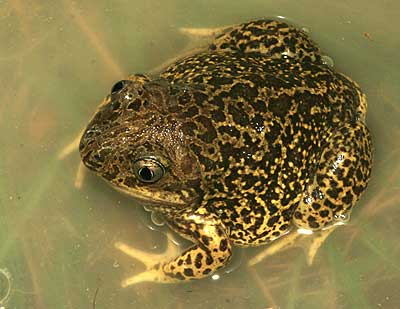
- Pelobates cultripes

Scientific classification
- Kingdom: Animalia
- Phylum: Chordata
- Class: Amphibia
- Order: Anura
- Suborder: Mesobatrachia
- Superfamily: Pelobatoidea; Stannius, 1856

= Pelobatoidea =

Superfamily of amphibians

The Pelobatoidea are a superfamily of frogs. They typically combine a toad-like body shape with a frog-like, pointed face (hence the German name 'Krötenfrösche', literally 'toad frogs'). Phylogenetically they stand between primitive frogs (fire-bellied toads, midwife toads) on the one side and higher frogs (the family of true toads, tree frogs, and the family of true frogs) on the other and are therefore – among other things by characteristics of bone construction – in the suborder Mesobatrachia.

Per 2016, the Pelobatoidea contain 202 species in 11 genera and 2 families. The distribution covers Europe, North Africa and West Asia (Family Pelobatidae) and Southeast Asia (family Megophryidae). Their sister group are the Pelodytoidea, consisting of North American spadefood toads and parsley frogs.

A striking characteristic is the vertically slit pupil in daylight. The tongue is thick, circular, and almost entirely adhering to the floor of the mouth. When mating the males clutches the females in the lumbar region, just before the hind legs (inguinal Amplexus).

== Taxonomy to the genus level ==
- Family Megophryidae Bonaparte, 1850 - Litter frogs or Asian toad frogs (202 species)
  - Genus Atympanophrys Tian and Hu, 1983 (4 species)
  - Genus Brachytarsophrys Tian and Hu, 1983 - Karin Hills frogs (5 species)
  - Genus Leptobrachella Smith, 1925 - Borneo frogs (9 species)
  - Genus Leptobrachium Tschudi, 1838 - Eastern spade foot toads (35 species; including previous Vibrissaphora species)
  - Genus Leptolalax Dubois, 1980- Asian toads (50 species)
  - Genus Megophrys Kuhl & Hasselt, 1822 - Asian spadefoot toads (8 species)
    - Species Megophrys nasuta Schlegel, 1858 - Long-nosed horned frog
  - Genus Ophryophryne Boulenger, 1903 - Mountain toads (5 species)
  - Genus Oreolalax Myers & Leviton, 1962 (18 species)
  - Genus Scutiger Theobald, 1868 - Lazy Toads (21 species)
  - Genus Xenophrys Günther, 1864 (47 species)
- Family Pelobatidae Bonaparte, 1850 - Palearctic Spadefoot toads (4 species)
  - Genus Pelobates Wagler, 1830 - European spade foot toads (4 species)
    - Species Pelobates cultripes Cuvier, 1829 - Western Spadefoot
    - Species Pelobates fuscus Laurenti, 1768 - Common Spadefoot

== Pelodytoidea ==
- Family Pelodytidae Bonaparte, 1850 - Parsley frogs or Mud divers (3 species)
  - Genus Pelodytes Bonaparte, 1838 - Parsley frogs (3 species)
    - Species Pelodytes punctatus Daudin, 1802 - Common parsley frog
- Family Scaphiopodidae Cope, 1865 - Nearctic spadefoot toads
  - Genus Scaphiopus Holbrook, 1836 Eastern or Southern Spadefoot Toads (3 species)
    - Species Scaphiopus couchii Baird, 1854 - Couch's spadefoot toad
  - Genus Spea Cope, 1866 Western Spadefoots (4 species)
