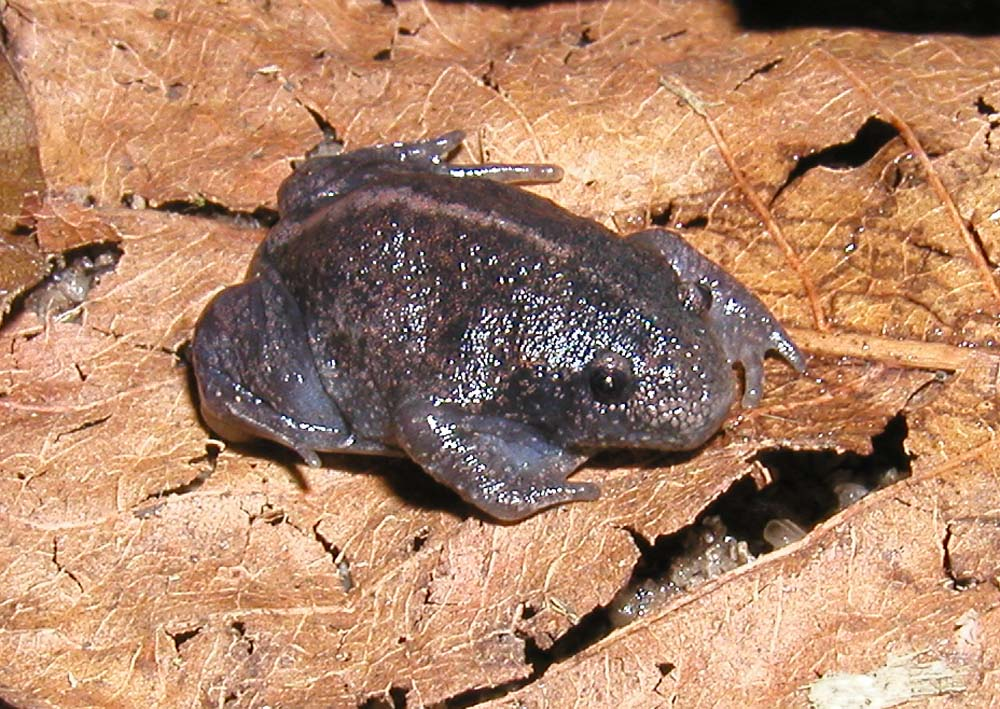
- Rhinophrynus dorsalis

Scientific classification
- Domain: Eukaryota
- Kingdom: Animalia
- Phylum: Chordata
- Class: Amphibia
- Order: Anura
- Suborder: Mesobatrachia

Families
- Megophryidae Pelobatidae Pelodytidae Pipidae Rhinophrynidae Scaphiopodidae †Palaeobatrachidae

= Mesobatrachia =

Mesobatrachia Temporal range: Late Jurassic to present, 155.7–0 Ma

Order of amphibians

The Mesobatrachia (Ancient Greek μέσος (mésos, "middle") + batrachia ("frogs")) is a paraphyletic group of relatively primitive frogs. At the end of 2016, it contained 3 superfamilies (Pelobatoidea, Pelodytoidea and Pipoidea), 6 families, 16 genera, and 244 species. Recognized as a group in 1993, the name is contrasted with the primitive Archaeobatrachia and the more diverse and advanced Neobatrachia.

The Mesobatrachia comprise five fossorial families, including the spadefoot toads of Europe, North America, and East Asia, the parsley frogs, and the Mexican burrowing toad, as well as one obligatorily aquatic family, the Pipidae of Africa and South America. Later studies recognised that the group was paraphyletic with respect to Neobatrachia.

The families currently accepted in the Mesobatrachia suborder are:

- Megophryidae
- Pelobatidae
- Pelodytidae
- Pipidae
- Rhinophrynidae
- Scaphiopodidae
