= Miopelodytes =

Miopelodytes Temporal range: Miocene, 15.97–11.608 Ma

Scientific classification
- Kingdom: Animalia
- Phylum: Chordata
- Class: Amphibia
- Order: Anura
- Family: Pelodytidae
- Genus: †Miopelodytes; Taylor, 1941

Type species
- Miopelodytes gilmorei Taylor, 1941

Extinct genus of amphibians

Miopelodytes is an extinct genus of prehistoric frog known from Miocene of Nevada.

== See also ==
- Prehistoric amphibian
- List of prehistoric amphibians
