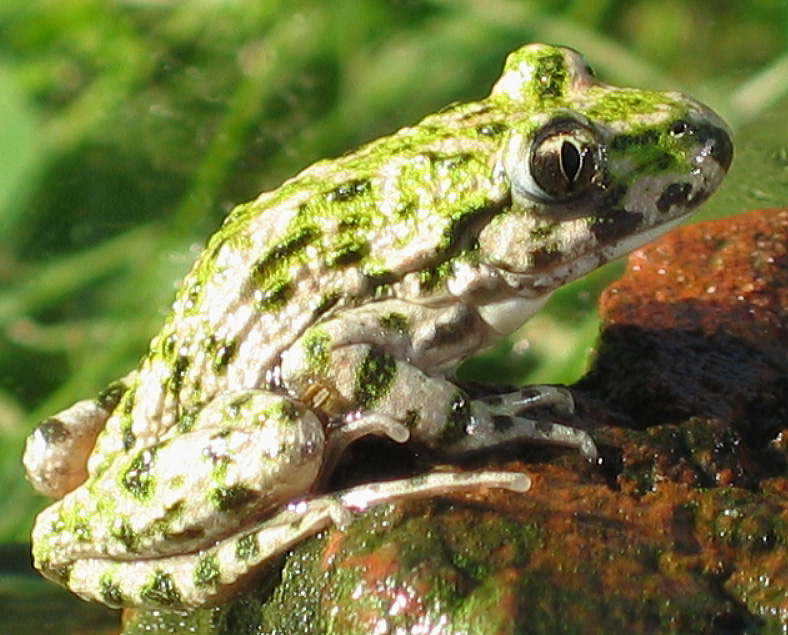
- Common parsley frog

Scientific classification
- Kingdom: Animalia
- Phylum: Chordata
- Class: Amphibia
- Order: Anura
- Superfamily: Pelobatoidea
- Family: Pelodytidae
- Genus: Pelodytes; Bonaparte, 1838

Species
- See text
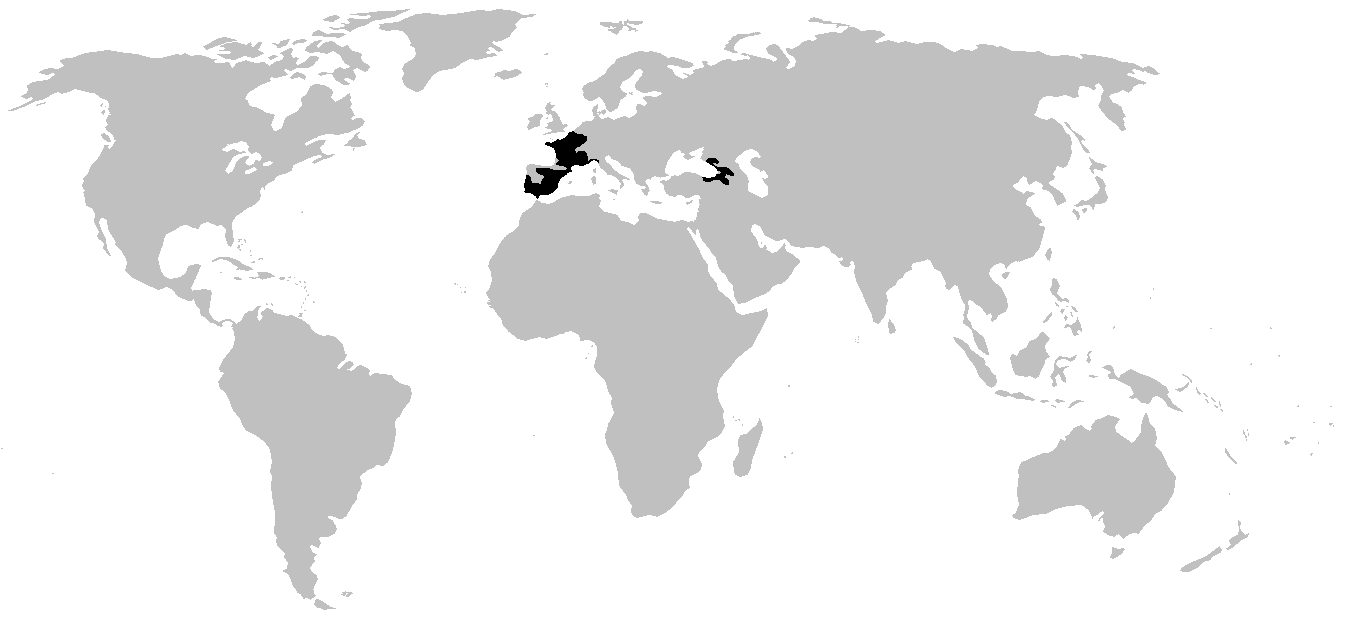
- Distribution of Pelodytidae (in black)
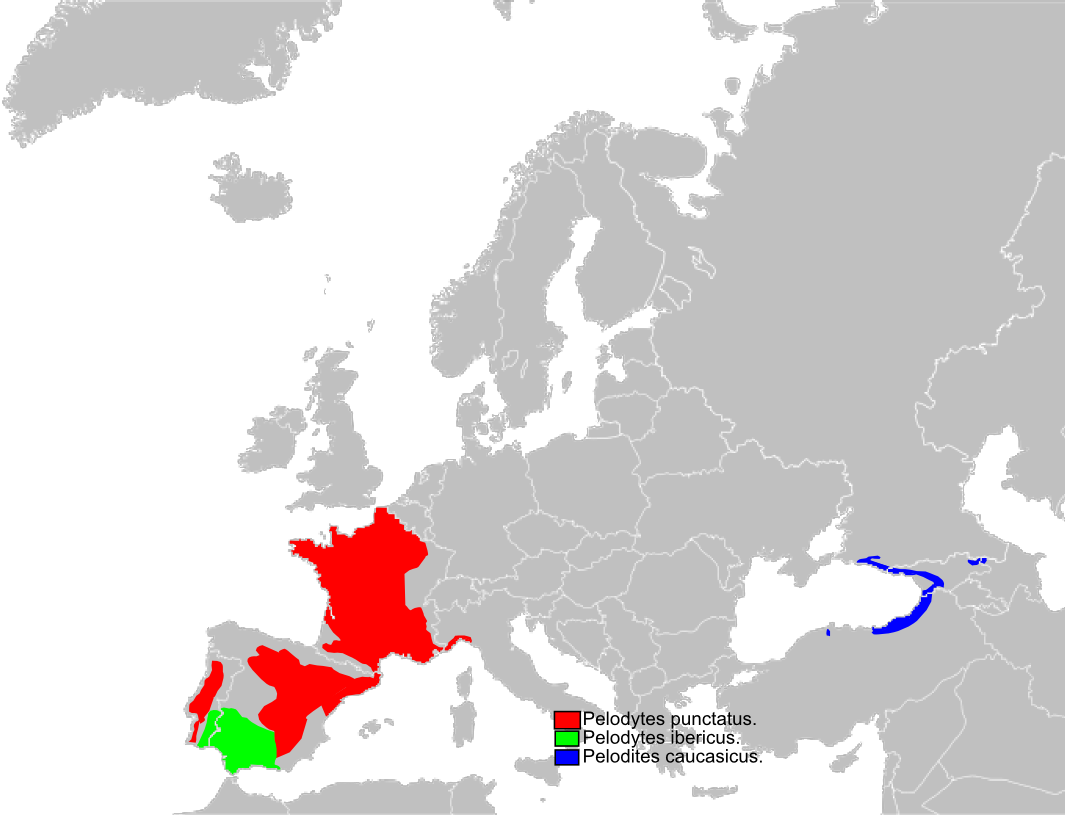
- Distribution of Pelodytidae

= Parsley frog =

Parsley frog Temporal range: 47–0 Ma Mid Eocene – Recent

Family of amphibians

The Parsley frog or Pelodytidae are a family of order Anura. The family consists of a single genus, Pelodytes, which contains five species, two of which are extinct. These frogs can be found in south-western Europe and the Caucasus. The common name of "parsley frog" comes from the frog's colouring, as it appears to be garnished with chopped parsley.

Parsley frogs are typical-looking frogs closely related to European spadefoot toads and megophryids, but differ largely in appearance. Their cryptic colouring is not as strong as in many megophryids, but they are still quite well-camouflaged, typically being green or brown. Unlike the European spadefoot toads, they lack hardened protrusions on their feet, although they are still fossorial, and are generally slender.

The parsley frogs are small, smooth-skinned frogs, reaching a length of 5 cm (2.0 in). They are one of the few families of frogs which contain more known extinct species and genera (two or three) than extant species. Although now found only in the Palearctic realm, fossils of a mid-Miocene species were also found in North America.

== Reproductive Patterns ==
Male parsley frogs will display a mating call during breeding season. The males will also develop dark tubercles on the skin covering the stomach area. Parsley frogs have the ability to mate with some other species of amphibians when needed as well as have two distinct mating seasons in the Spring and the Autumn.

Parsley frogs will lay their eggs in bodies of water such as ponds, causing the frogs to depend on the yearly rain keeping the water source from drying out. When the females lay their eggs, they do so on underwater plants in a zig-zag motion. This group of eggs is called a clutch and is generally made up of around 400 eggs but varies greatly. After being laid, it takes 8-10 days for the tadpoles to hatch, and another 75-100 days until they are fully developed.

== Taxonomy ==
- Family Pelodytidae
  - Genus Pelodytes
    - Pelodytes atlanticus – Lusitanian parsley frog
    - Pelodytes caucasicus – Caucasian parsley frog
    - Pelodytes hespericus – Hesperides' parsley frog
    - Pelodytes ibericus – Iberian parsley frog
    - Pelodytes punctatus – Common parsley frog
