= Tephrodytes =

Tephrodytes Temporal range: Arikareean, 29–18 Ma

Scientific classification
- Domain: Eukaryota
- Kingdom: Animalia
- Phylum: Chordata
- Class: Amphibia
- Order: Anura
- Family: Pelodytidae
- Genus: †Tephrodytes; Henrici, 1994

Type species
- Tephrodytes brassicarvalis Henrici, 1994

Extinct genus of amphibians

Tephrodytes is an extinct genus of prehistoric frog known from Arikareean of Montana.

== See also ==
- Prehistoric amphibian
- List of prehistoric amphibians
