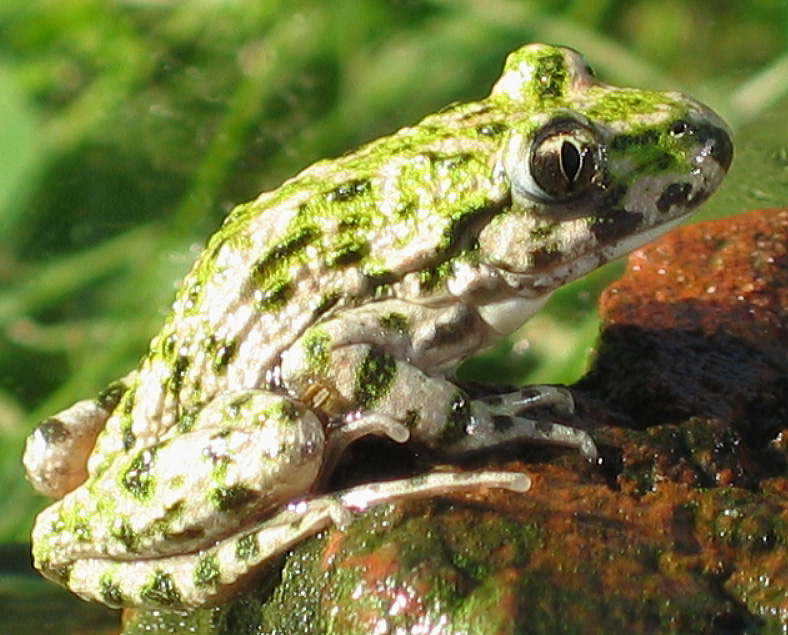

Conservation status
- Least Concern (IUCN 3.1)

Scientific classification
- Kingdom: Animalia
- Phylum: Chordata
- Class: Amphibia
- Order: Anura
- Family: Pelodytidae
- Genus: Pelodytes
- Species: P. punctatus

Binomial name
- Pelodytes punctatus Daudin, 1802
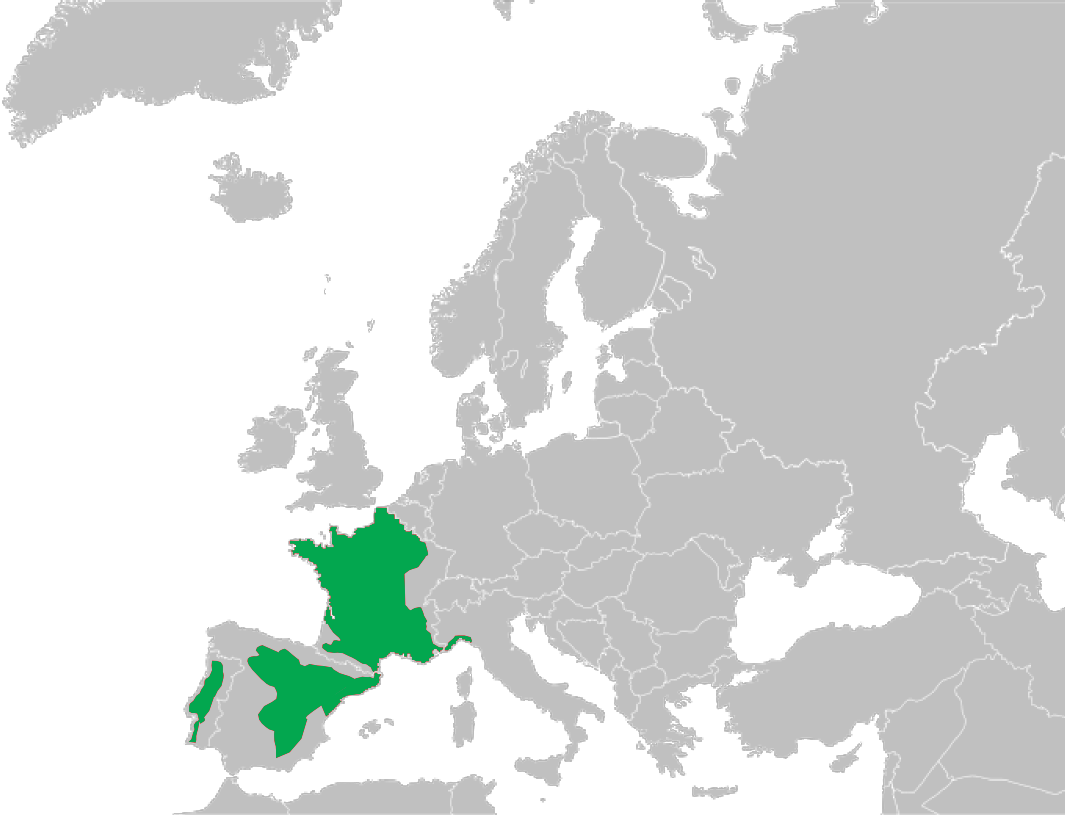

= Common parsley frog =

Species of amphibian

The common parsley frog (Pelodytes punctatus) is a species of frog in the genus Pelodytes. It lives southwestern Europe, including France. Its earliest identification is believed to be from 1802.

== Description ==
The common parsley frog (Pelodytes punctatus) is a very small and slender frog with long hind legs, a flat head, and vertical pupils. Males tend to only reach 3.5 cm (1.4 in), whereas females are typically larger at 3.9 cm (1.5 in). The upper part of the body is variable in colour, usually with irregular green patches on a light brown, grey, or light olive background. The frog's back is dotted with elongated warts, often in undulating longitudinal rows that may be orange along the flanks. Behind the protruding eyes and above the tympanum there is a short small gland. It does not have parotid glands. The underside of the frog is white and yellow-orange around the pelvis.

They are fossorial, meaning they can live underground with limbs suited for burying and digging. In the mating season, males develop dark swellings on the insides of their digits and forelimbs, as well as on the chest. The males' forelimbs are usually stronger than the females. They are not completely cryptic like many other species of frog, but are still camouflaged in their environments. They can jump 50–70 cm (19.5–27.5 in) in a single leap, and they are referred to as the "Mud-Jumper", or "Modderkruiper" in Germany, for this ability.

== Taxonomy ==
The common parsley frog (Pelodytes punctatus) is a member of the Pelodytidae family and Pelodytes genus. There is only a single genus within the family, and there are more extinct species and genera than currently living in the phylogenetic tree. Their close relatives include other parsley frogs as the Lusitanian parsley frog (Pelodytes atlanticus), the Caucasian parsley frog (Pelodytes caucasicus), the Hesperides' parsley frog (Pelodytes hespericus), and the Iberian parsley frog (Pelodytes ibericus –) as well as European spadefoot toads and megophryidae.

== Habitat and distribution ==
These frogs can be found in France, Northeastern Spain and a small part of Northwestern Italy (southern Piedmont and Liguria, specifically). Their numbers are decreasing all over the distribution range due to habitat changes that eliminate their breeding sites. They are also threatened and more at-risk in southern Spain and northern Portugal. The current situation of the genus is under discussion and there is disagreement regarding the taxonomy due to the separation of the lineages, especially in the different contact zones within the Iberian Peninsula.

The habitats of the frogs reach from sea level to middle mountainous regions as high as 1,630–2,000 meters (5,350–6,560 feet) above sea level. Though they can live comfortably in that range, they prefer to breed at lower elevations of around 60–460 meters (200–1,510 feet) above sea level.

The parsley frog's habits differ from one ecological niche to another since they are heavily weather-dependent. Because of their diverse range and flexibility in egg-laying and mating habits, different local parsley frogs may not have the same date range as another frog of the same species that lives somewhere with a different weather pattern.

== Behavior ==
=== Mating and behavior ===
Pelodytes punctatus breed on a temporal schedule. They can breed twice a year, once in the autumn and once in the spring, and having two separate mating seasons is of evolutionary benefit as this increases their numbers of offspring. The flexibility in breeding patterns allows them to better adapt to differences in their environment. However, the ponds in which they breed are not necessarily the ponds that they go on to live in as adults. There are three models of breeding, the opportunity, contingent, and bet-hedging model. In the opportunity model, the frogs may reproduce in the spring and autumn months of a given year. In the contingent model, frogs will select a season to reproduce and stick with it year after year, even if it was not the season they were born in. In the bet-hedging model, they switch back and forth between autumn and spring breeding throughout their lives and several breeding seasons, depending on the environment and their own fitness at the time.

In France, the breeding season spans from the end of February to early April; in Portugal, it is from November to March. In Andalusia, this parsley frog may spawn several times a year, and the bimodal mating can be seen in various other habitats as well. Parsley frogs generally tend to lay eggs following intense rainfall. If there is an unusual drought, they can postpone their breeding for up to two months, from March to May. They often choose temporary ponds with aquatic plant life as their preferred breeding sites. There is a positive, though weak, correlation between the depth of a pond and the frogs's preference to breed. They also prefer to lay eggs on aquatic vegetation that is submerged underwater. The area of ponds is much more important to the frogs, and they prefer breeding ponds that have large areas. Parsley frogs have also been reported to breed in small streams or artificial reservoirs. They lay their eggs in a "zig-zag" pattern and have been observed to deposit over ten clutches.

The frogs' breeding habitats are generally unpredictable due to their preferences, and since the ponds are temporary, may vary from year to year. Mediterranean species typically prefer autumn reproductions, which may be regulated by air temperature and biological instinct in the frog. Tadpoles hatched in autumn months tend to fare better than those in the spring. This is potentially due to having extended time to develop through winter, less competition, and decreased predation.

Parsley frogs engage in amplexus to reproduce, and female frogs can lay anywhere from 30 to 400 eggs.

=== Development and reproduction ===
Metamorphosis can occur as early as January or February until March, depending on the distribution range. In the metamorphosis process, parsley frogs exhibit phenotype plasticity, in part because their breeding habitats are so uncertain. There are different sizes and other physiological changes seen in some frogs of the same species. These changes are due to plasticity, or morphing into different phenotypes to best adapt to their unique environment. In ponds that are shallower or dry more quickly, different phenotypes or characteristics are observed in the young frogs. Drier ponds yield a shorter larval period for the frogs. Eggs laid in ponds with consistent depth, and then tadpoles living in that environment generally have a larger body size, depth, tail length and depth, and tail fin length and depth. These differences do not impact the survival rate of the frogs, however. Similar trends persist once the tadpoles metamorphose into toadlets, with the drier ponds producing smaller frogs. The different sizes could be responsible for other behaviors or aspects of the frogs' lives (i.e., mating, fecundity). Terrestrial life for the frogs does not appear to be greatly impacted, other than the size differences aforementioned. Many other anuran species exhibit similar size and growth trends about drying environments. Still, the parsley frog's actual morphological changes and the plasticity, or ability to change, are noteworthy as they are determined to be mostly plastic and not genetic or induced via mutations.

=== Tadpole behavior ===
P. punctatus tadpoles are notoriously poor competitors. This is witnessed when they co-habitat with other species in the same ponds. The tail fin of tadpoles may become obsolete in shallower waters, so different morphologies of tadpoles may thrive in different environments, even within the same species.

=== Adult behavior ===
Regardless of tadpole environment or size, parsley frogs' jumping ability is relatively strong. Male frogs often tend to be sedentary and inhabit the same shelters in non-breeding times of the year, and return to the same locations over several years. Females live near males and seek them out in breeding seasons and when ready to mate.

The parsley frog hibernates for shorter times than other anurans, and some southern species skip hibernation altogether. Frogs that do hibernate will generally enter hibernation after the fall breed and resume reproductive activities for spring breeds following.

=== Vocalizations ===
Male parsley frogs utilize paired inner vocal sacs to croak underwater. They are fairly quiet in this process. The males create a relatively quiet croaking noise with the help of their paired inner vocal sacs, also underwater. Female frogs may respond with a "kee, kee" call.

The parsley frog has been known to have different calls based on the region it lives in, size, or temperature. They have an elaborate calling system, but an average human more than 300 meters (980 feet) away will be unable to hear the quiet call. Calls can last for about 1.5 to 3 seconds. Larger sizes of the calling frog usually will lead to a longer call with a lower-pitched signal. Increased temperatures will do the opposite, quickening their signals. Most males do not submerge themselves in the water when calling, though some do.

=== Genetic diversity and plasticity ===
In addition to plasticity, parsley frogs also exhibit a great deal of true genetic diversity. Several microsatellites have been mapped onto their alleles, and demonstrates that there are many different alleles present in their genetic field. The mapped microsatellites, or small repeats of DNA, can indicate uniqueness and ability to splice mRNA and other genetic material differently. Different splices can yield different phenotypes, and thus behaviors and characteristics. Recently, eight microsatellites were identified that can be considered important in understanding bimodal reproduction in autumn and spring. These markers could be used to understand how and why the frogs choose to breed and when.

== Conservation ==
=== Climate change ===
There used to be a larger concern for the survival of this species, but in recent years it has been determined that they are at low risk for extinction. One large issue facing these frogs related to climate change is introducing invasive species, such as fish and crayfish. These new predators can increase predation, decrease tadpole survival, and thus diminish the frogs' numbers. The introduction of the American red swamp crayfish, Procambarus clarkii, is an example of how invasive species can impact parsley frog behavior and life.

Pelodytes punctatus tadpoles have relatively high plasticity, as mentioned above. However, they have been impacted by changing ecosystems and introducing new and invasive species into their habitats. Native tadpole predators can include larval Aeshnid dragonflies, or other insects or animals they share habitat with. The invasive fish species, Gumbusia holbrooki (Eastern mosquitofish), first appeared in their habitats near the Iberian peninsula several decades ago. Invasive predators may have negative impacts on morphological development, studying tadpole growth and increasing rates of tadpole mortality. It only took 30 years for the frogs to exhibit physical changes after cohabitation with the crayfish. Parsley frogs also experienced behavioral changes in the presence of invasive fishes. Because of the recent introduction of invasive species, there is still co-evolution occurring, and some scientists determined that there needs to be a longer period of co-habituation to fully determine the effect of the invasive species on the parsley frog tadpoles.

The frogs also occupy fewer ponds annually. From 1997 to 1999, the Mediterranean ponds that typically housed their larvae decreased by nearly half. The biggest threat to their breeding pools is drying, which can be precipitated by man-made drainage of wetlands or construction work in their environments. They also face danger from fires for similar reasons of habitat or breeding ground destruction. The parsley frog has a relatively high ability to adapt and exhibit plasticity (see above breeding and early life behaviors). Because of this, they may be able to quickly shift into new ecosystems even in the face of climate change and shifting ecologies.

=== In captivity ===
These frogs can potentially thrive in captivity but were rarely kept as pets in the nineteenth century. There is little evidence to suggest that they are kept as pets today.

=== Legal protection ===
The parsley frog is not critically endangered but protected under law in Europe. There are several European laws that protect this frog: in France, The Berne Convention, Appendix III (1979); in Italy, Habitats Directive 1992/43/CEE; in Piedmont, Italy, Piedmont Regional Law 29/1984, Article I; and in Liguria, Italy, Liguria Regional Law 4/1992, Article 11. Because of the temporality of their breeding grounds, conservation efforts may be widespread and broad.
