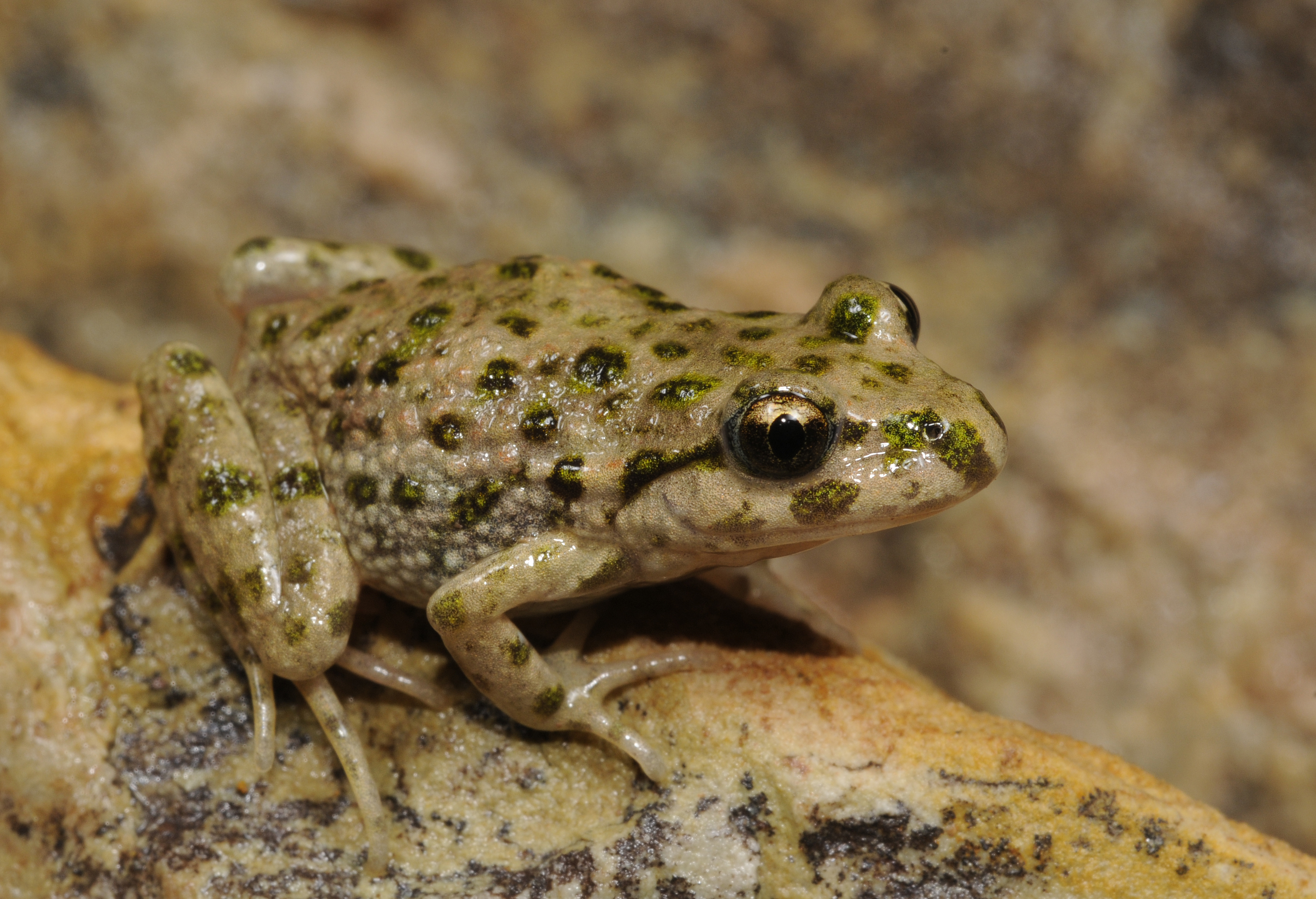

Conservation status
- Least Concern (IUCN 3.1)

Scientific classification
- Kingdom: Animalia
- Phylum: Chordata
- Class: Amphibia
- Order: Anura
- Family: Pelodytidae
- Genus: Pelodytes
- Species: P. ibericus

Binomial name
- Pelodytes ibericus Sánchez-Herráiz, Barbadillo, Machordom & Sanchiz, 2000
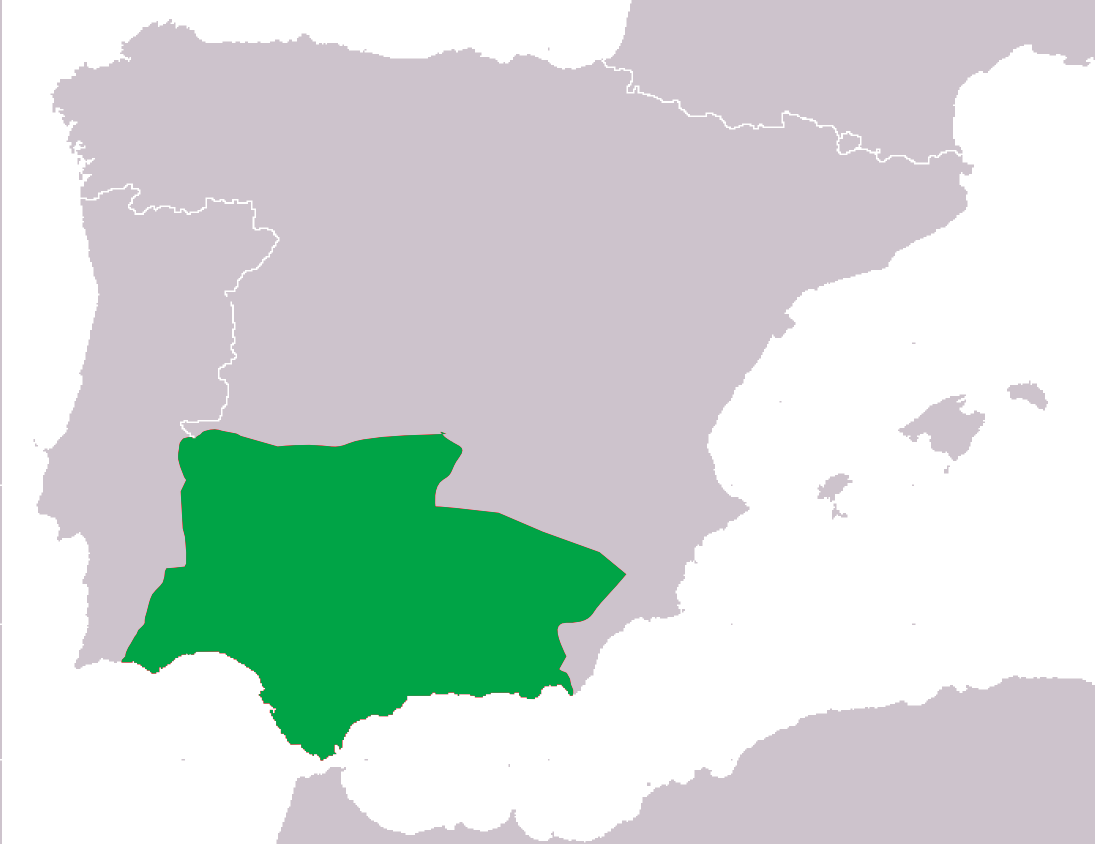

= Iberian parsley frog =

Species of amphibian

The Iberian parsley frog (Pelodytes ibericus) is a species of frogs in the family Pelodytidae, known as "parsley frogs" because of their green speckles. This species is only found in Portugal and Spain; in Spanish it is known as sapillo moteado ibérico.

== Description ==
Adult Iberian parsley frogs attain a length of about 4 centimetres (1.6 in) and look very similar to the common parsley frog (Pelodytes punctatus, its sister species) but are a little smaller with shorter limbs. The skin is smooth or granular with a scattering of dark-coloured tubercles. The dorsal surface varies from olive, greenish-brown, dark brown or greenish-grey and is flecked with green specks. The undersurface is white or cream and the throat of breeding males is dark-coloured.

== Distribution and habitat ==
The Iberian parsley frog is endemic to the Iberian Peninsula. It is quite common in suitable habitats in Spain but seems to be rare in Portugal. It occurs in open areas, under bushes, among scattered trees, in salt marshes, fields and gardens. It can continue to live in intensively farmed areas.

== Breeding ==
Breeding takes place in the spring, often after heavy rain. Eggs are laid in ponds, ditches, slow-moving streams and flooded areas. Egg masses contain up to 350 eggs and several clutches may be laid over the course of a few days. The eggs hatch after about a fortnight and the tadpoles may take about three months to develop before undergoing metamorphosis into juvenile frogs.

== Conservation status ==
This frog has a wide range and the overall population seems to be reasonably stable. The International Union for Conservation of Nature (IUCN) rates it as being of "Least Concern" as it considers that the rate of decline, if any, is insufficient to justify listing it in a more threatened category. This frog is common over much of its range and the main threats it faces have been identified as degradation of its habitat, loss of breeding pools, and predation by the invasive freshwater crayfish Procambarus clarkii.
