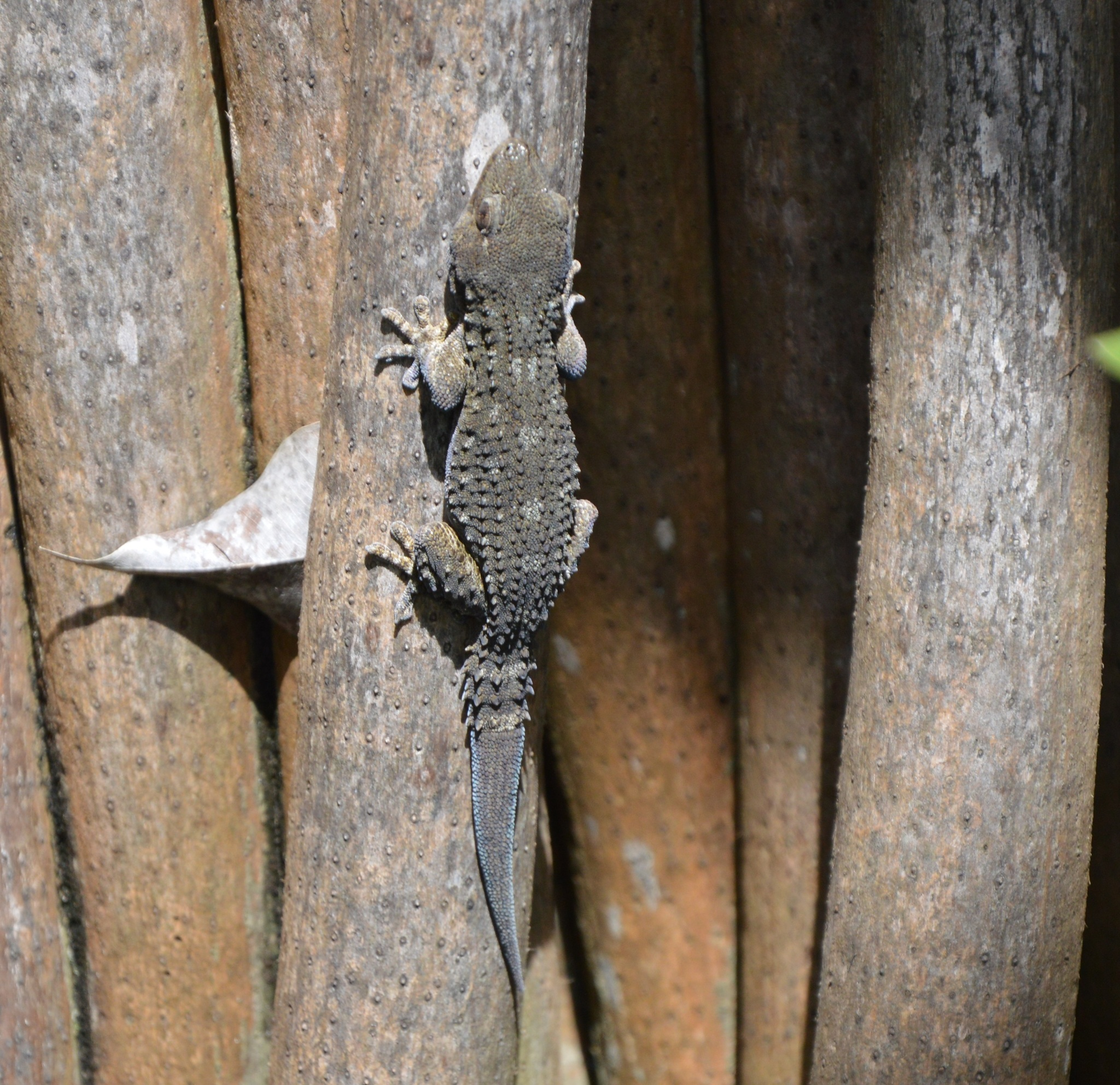

Conservation status
- Least Concern (IUCN 3.1)

Scientific classification
- Kingdom: Animalia
- Phylum: Chordata
- Class: Reptilia
- Order: Squamata
- Suborder: Gekkota
- Family: Phyllodactylidae
- Genus: Tarentola
- Species: T. delalandii

Binomial name
- Tarentola delalandii (A.M.C. Duméril & Bibron, 1836)

Synonyms
- Platydactylus delalandii A.M.C. Duméril & Bibron, 1836; Gecko delalandii — Webb & Berthelot, 1839; Tarentola delalandii — Gray, 1845

= Tenerife gecko =

Species of lizard

The Tenerife gecko (Tarentola delalandii), also known commonly as Delalande's gecko and the Tenerife wall gecko, is a species of lizard in the family Phyllodactylidae.

== Etymology ==
The specific name, delalandii, is in honor of French naturalist Pierre Antoine Delalande.

== Geographic range ==
T. delalandii is endemic to Tenerife and La Palma, Canary Islands, Spain.

== Habitat ==
The natural habitats of T. delalandii are temperate forests, temperate shrubland, Mediterranean-type shrubby vegetation, rocky areas, rocky shores, pastureland, rural gardens, and urban areas, at altitudes from sea level to 2,300 m (7,500 ft).

== Reproduction ==
T. delalandii is oviparous. The eggs are laid under rocks.

== Conservation status ==
T. delalandii is threatened by habitat loss.
