= Pelodytes hespericus =

Scientific classification
- Kingdom: Animalia
- Phylum: Chordata
- Class: Amphibia
- Order: Anura
- Family: Pelodytidae
- Genus: Pelodytes
- Species: P. hespericus

Binomial name
- Pelodytes hespericus Díaz-Rodríguez, Gehara, Márquez, Vences, Gonçalves, Sequeira, Martínez-Solano, and Tejedo, 2017
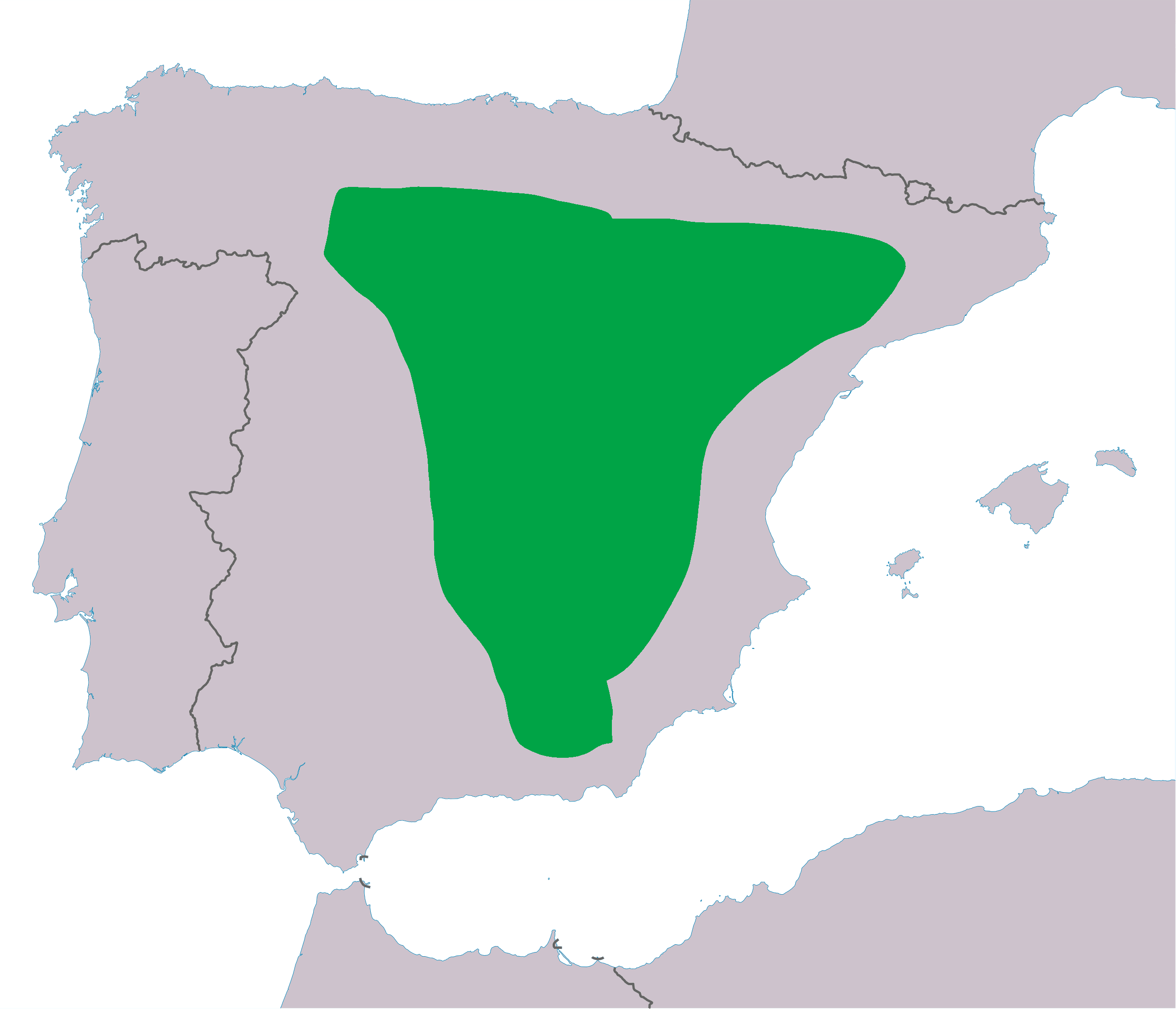

Species of amphibian

Pelodytes hespericus, the Hesperides' parsley frog, is a species of frog in the family Pelodytidae, This species is only found in Spain. It is a poorly known species.

== Distribution and habitat ==
The Hesperides' parsley frog is endemic to Spain. This species is found mostly in mid-elevation montane regions of eastern and central Spain.
