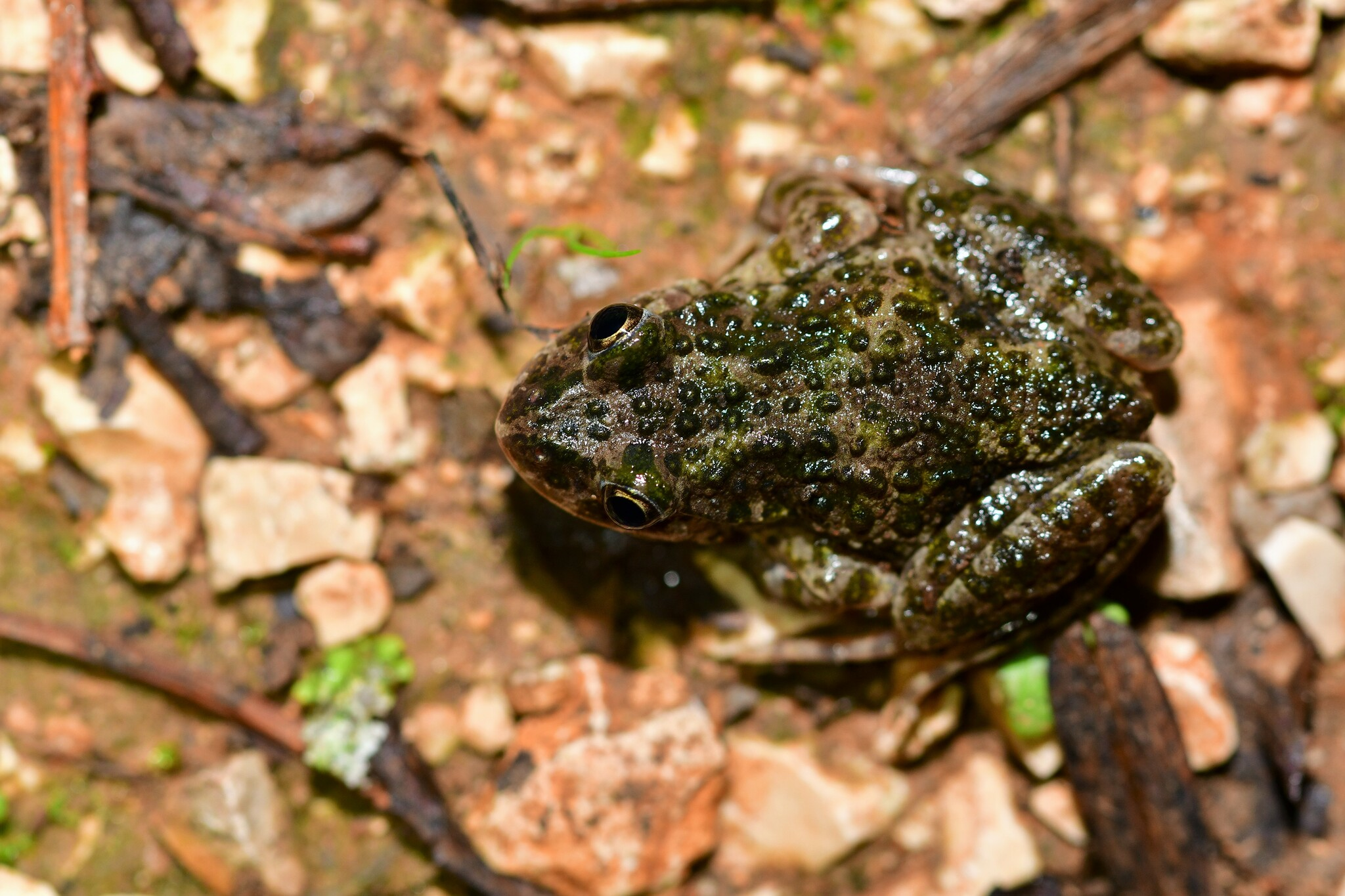
- Lusitanian parsley frog

Conservation status
- Least Concern (IUCN 3.1)

Scientific classification
- Kingdom: Animalia
- Phylum: Chordata
- Class: Amphibia
- Order: Anura
- Family: Pelodytidae
- Genus: Pelodytes
- Species: P. atlanticus

Binomial name
- Pelodytes atlanticus Díaz-Rodríguez, Gehara, Márquez, Vences, Gonçalves, Sequeira, Martínez-Solano, and Tejedo, 2017
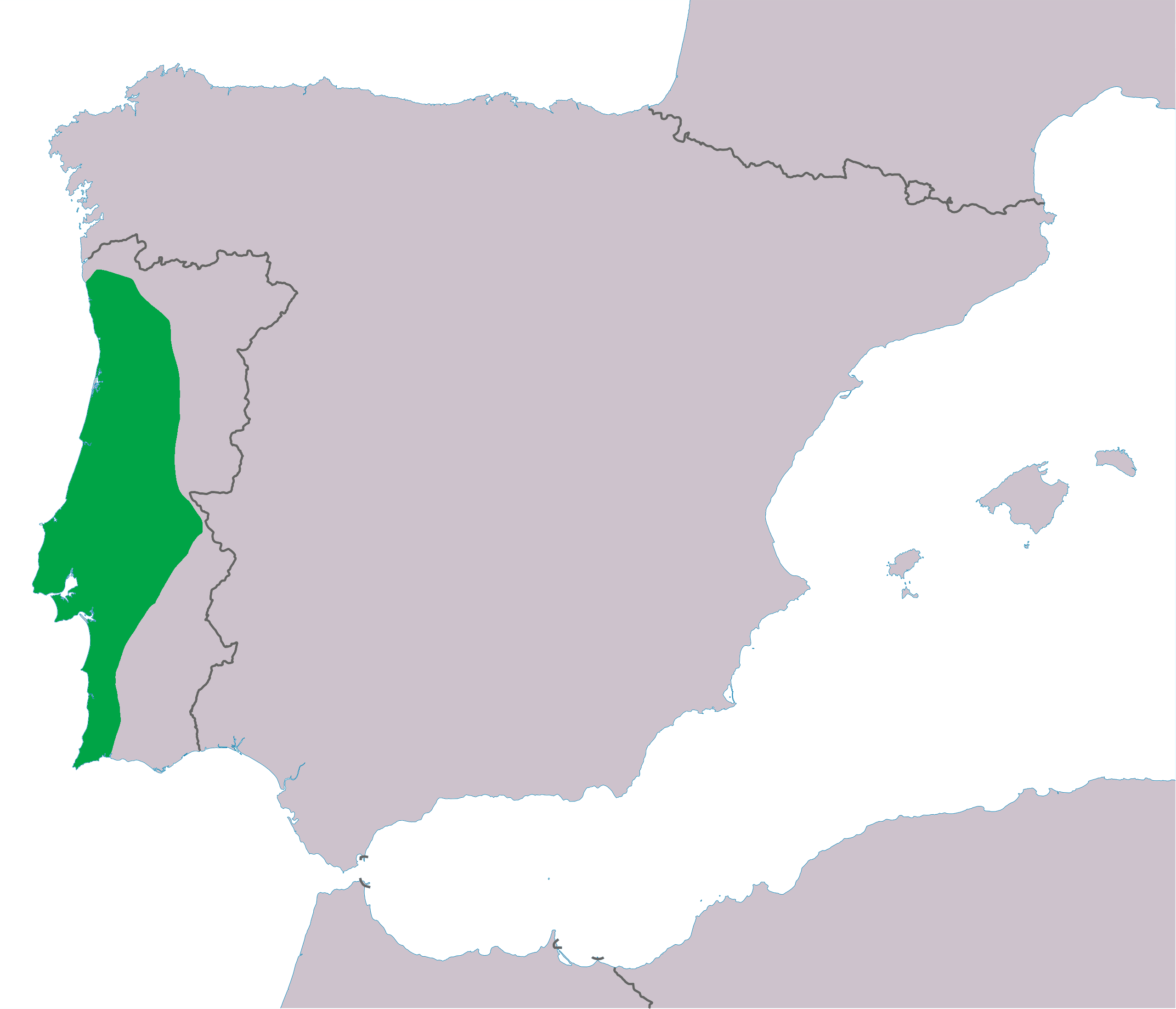

= Pelodytes atlanticus =

Species of amphibian

Pelodytes atlanticus, the Lusitanian parsley frog, is a species of frog in the family Pelodytidae, known as "parsley frogs" because of their green speckles. This species is only found in Portugal.

== Description ==
Adult Lusitanian parsley frogs have smooth or granular with a scattering of dark-coloured tubercles. The dorsal surface varies from olive, greenish-brown, dark brown or greenish-grey and is flecked with green specks.

== Distribution and habitat ==
The Lusitanian parsley frog is endemic to Portugal. This species is found mostly in temporary ponds in traditional farmland.
