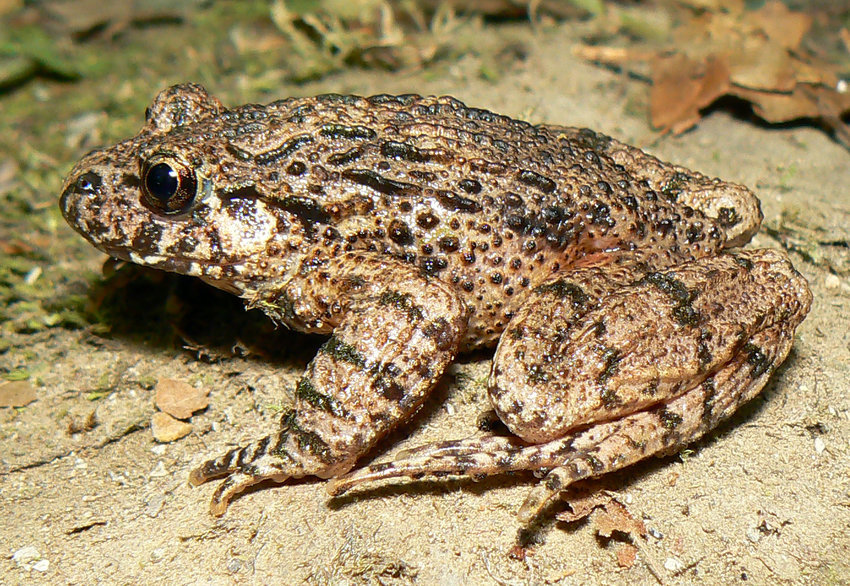

Conservation status
- Near Threatened (IUCN 3.1)

Scientific classification
- Kingdom: Animalia
- Phylum: Chordata
- Class: Amphibia
- Order: Anura
- Family: Pelodytidae
- Genus: Pelodytes
- Species: P. caucasicus

Binomial name
- Pelodytes caucasicus Boulenger, 1896
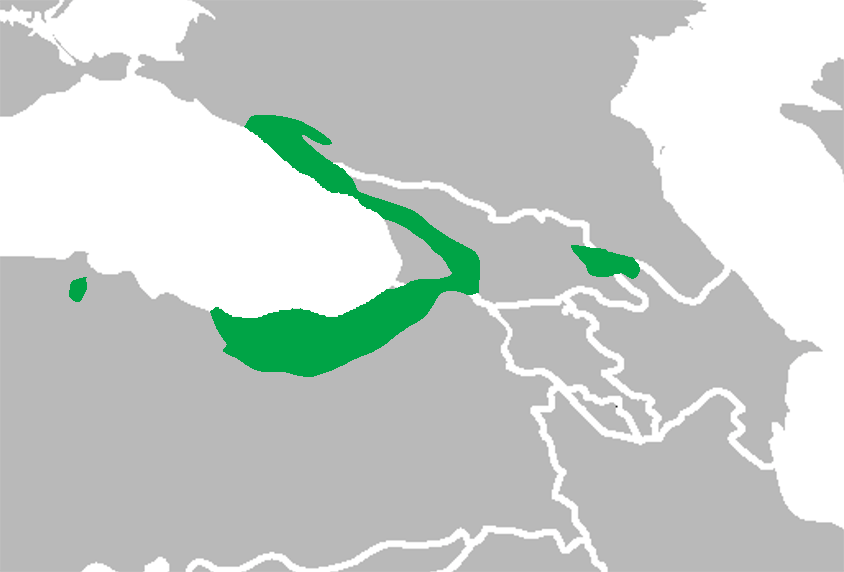

= Caucasian parsley frog =

Species of amphibian

The Caucasian parsley frog (Pelodytes caucasicus) is a species of frog in the family Pelodytidae. It is found in Azerbaijan, Georgia, Russia, Turkey, and possibly Armenia. Its natural habitats are temperate forests, temperate shrubland, rivers, intermittent rivers, freshwater marshes, intermittent freshwater marshes, and freshwater springs. It is threatened by habitat loss.

The natural history of this frog is poorly understood, with most of it coming from behaviors and habits observed during the spring when they gather in vernal pools to breed.

One study has found that during the summer, the frogs take shelter inside remote limestone caves, and showed a strong preference for caves which harbored colonies of bats. This is most likely because they could eat the insects that proliferated in the bats' guano.
