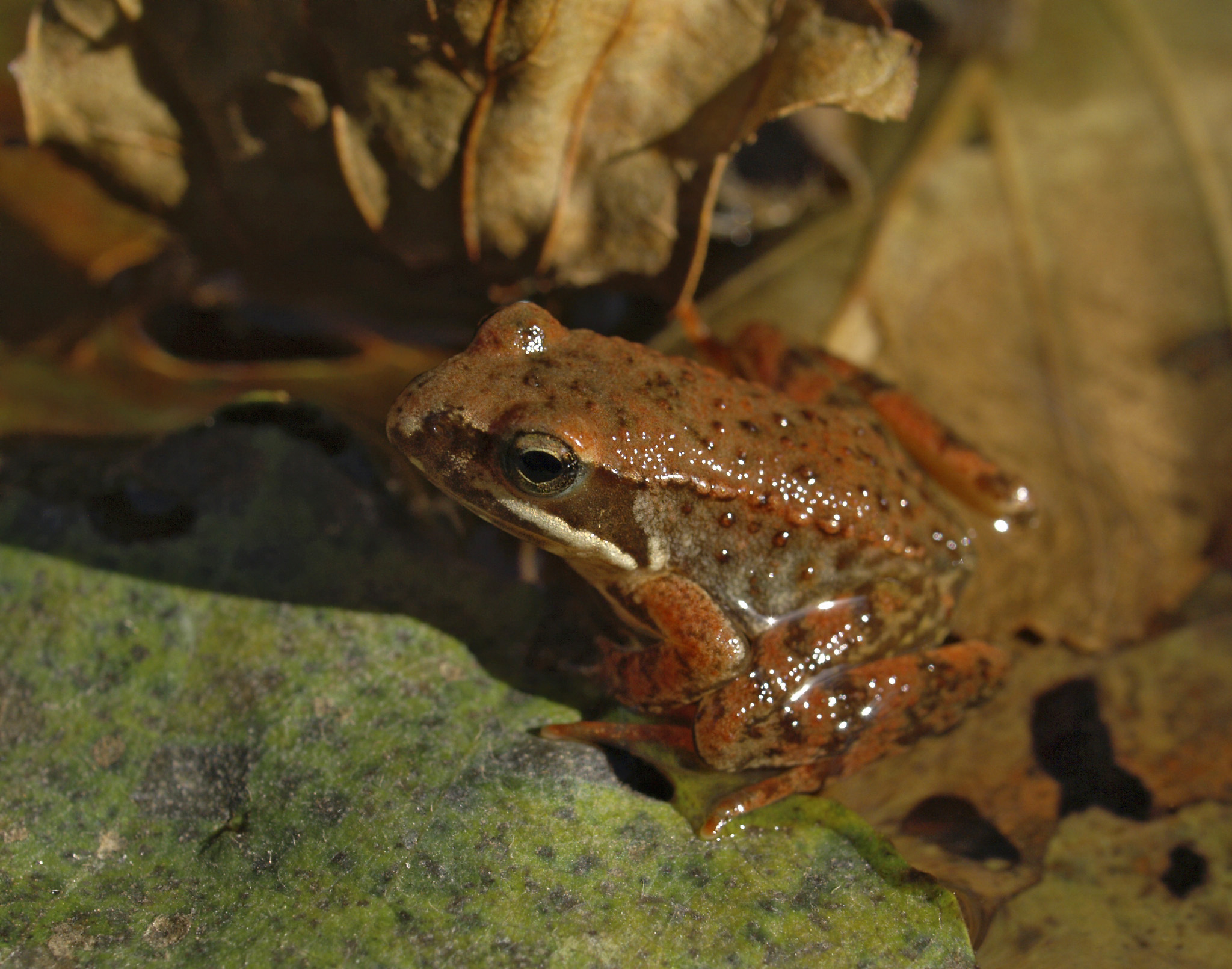

Conservation status
- Vulnerable (IUCN 3.1)

Scientific classification
- Kingdom: Animalia
- Phylum: Chordata
- Class: Amphibia
- Order: Anura
- Family: Ranidae
- Genus: Rana
- Species: R. iberica

Binomial name
- Rana iberica Boulenger, 1879
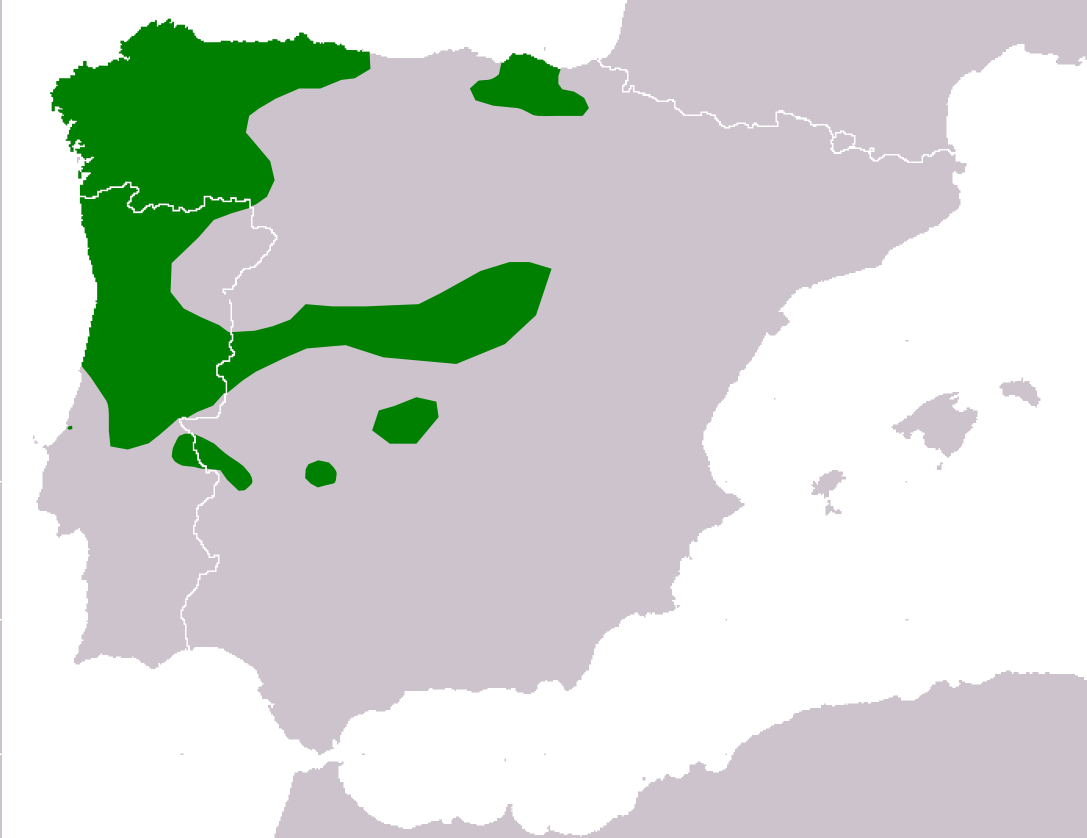

= Iberian frog =

Species of frog

The Iberian frog (Rana iberica), also known as Iberian stream frog, is a species of frog in the family Ranidae found in Portugal and Spain. Its natural habitats are rivers, mountain streams and swamps. It is threatened by habitat loss, introduced species, climate change, water contamination, and increased ultraviolet radiation.

== Description ==
The Iberian frog can grow to about 7 cm (2.8 in) in length but a more normal size is 5 cm (2.0 in). Females tend to be larger than males. The tympanum can be seen just behind the eye and is about half its size in diameter. From the side of the head to the groin is a distinct ridge, the dorsolateral fold, which distinguishes this species from the common frog. The skin is smooth with fine granulations. The colour is very variable, being mainly olive, reddish or greyish-brown, sometimes with darker markings. A dark streak runs between the nostril and the eye, and a thin, white line marks the upper lip. The hind legs are sometimes barred with dark brown. The hind feet are more completely webbed than the common frog. The underside is pale, sometimes with darker spots, but the centre of the throat is not spotted.

The Iberian frog has a distinctive call, which is generally produced at night. It sounds like "rao-rao-rao" and is issued at a rate of about three calls per second.

== Distribution and habitat ==
The Iberian frog is endemic to Portugal and north-western and central Spain. It is a mountain species and has been recorded at altitudes up to 2,425 m (7,956 ft). It is present in the northern half of Portugal and in Spain it is found in the region of Galicia, in west León and in north-west Zamora, with separate populations in mountainous regions in central Spain. It favours slow-moving streams and rivers with overhanging vegetation, ponds, and glacial lakes. It shares parts of its range with the agile frog (Rana dalmatina), Perez's frog (P. perezi) and the common frog (R. temporaria).

== Biology ==
The Iberian frog is an agile frog, jumping into the water if disturbed and swimming away rapidly. It is active both by day and night, and feeds on beetles, flies, caddisflies, stoneflies, spiders, and harvestmen. In Galicia and lowland Portugal, breeding takes place from November to March, but in upland areas, it occurs from March to May. Amplexus, with the male clinging to the back of the female, takes place in the water. Small clumps of eggs with a gelatinous coat are laid and are stuck to water weeds or placed beneath underwater stones. When the tadpoles hatch, they feed on vegetable matter and take about three months before they undergo metamorphosis into juvenile frogs. These are about 1.3 cm (0.5 in) long. Males become mature when they are about 3 cm (1.2 in) in length and females when they are rather larger.

== Conservation status ==
The Iberian frog is threatened by habitat loss through agriculture, deforestation, and the planting of non-native woodlands. Tourist development and recreational use of the land may cause disturbances. Introduced fish species and the presence of the American mink (Neogale vison), escaped from fur farms, may also reduce numbers. Parts of its range include two national parks, Parque Natural del Gorbea and Parque Natural de Izki, and in these it is protected. In other places, especially in the Sistema Central Mountains and Extremadura in Spain, populations are shrinking. The species is classified as being vulnerable in the IUCN Red List of Threatened Species.
