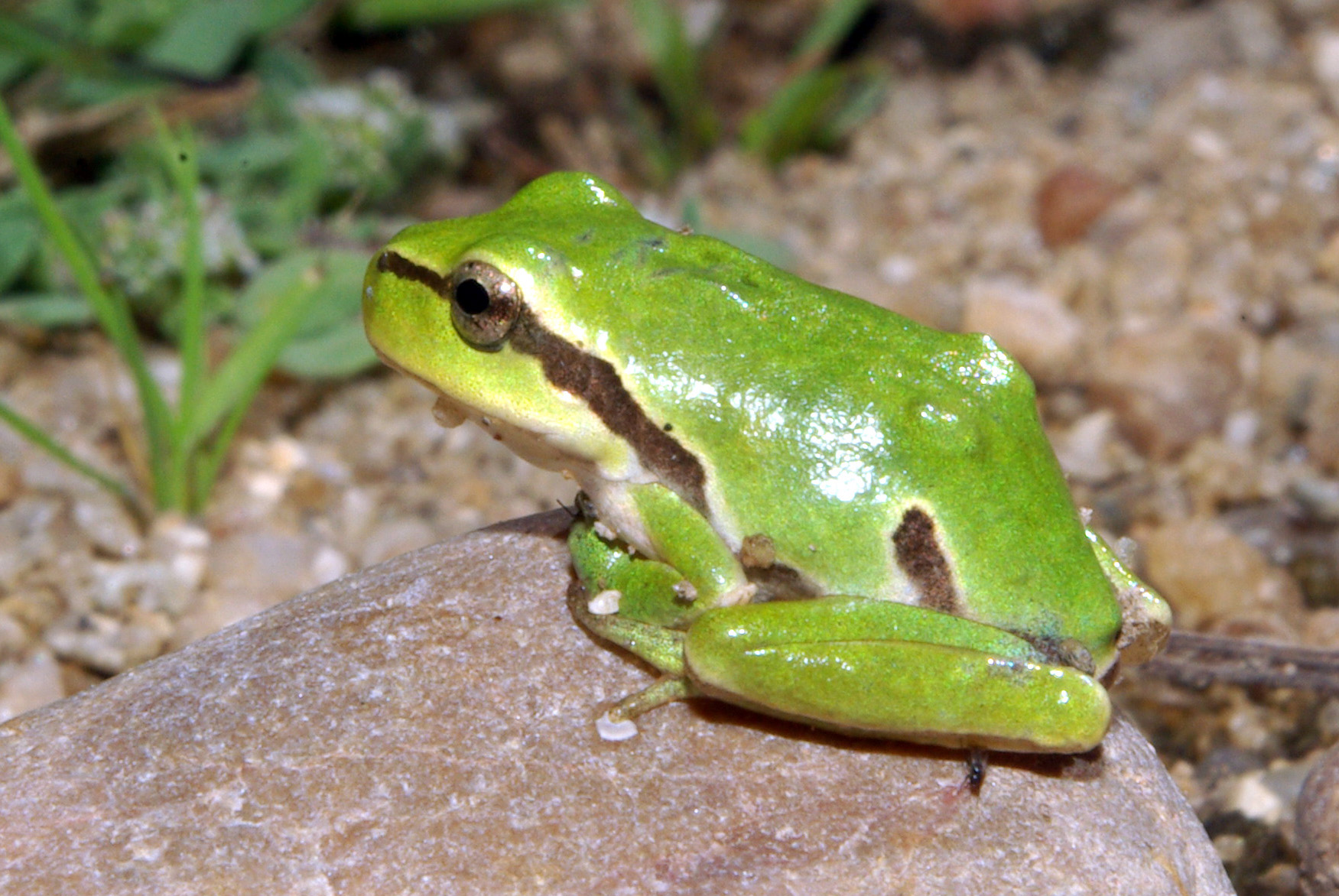

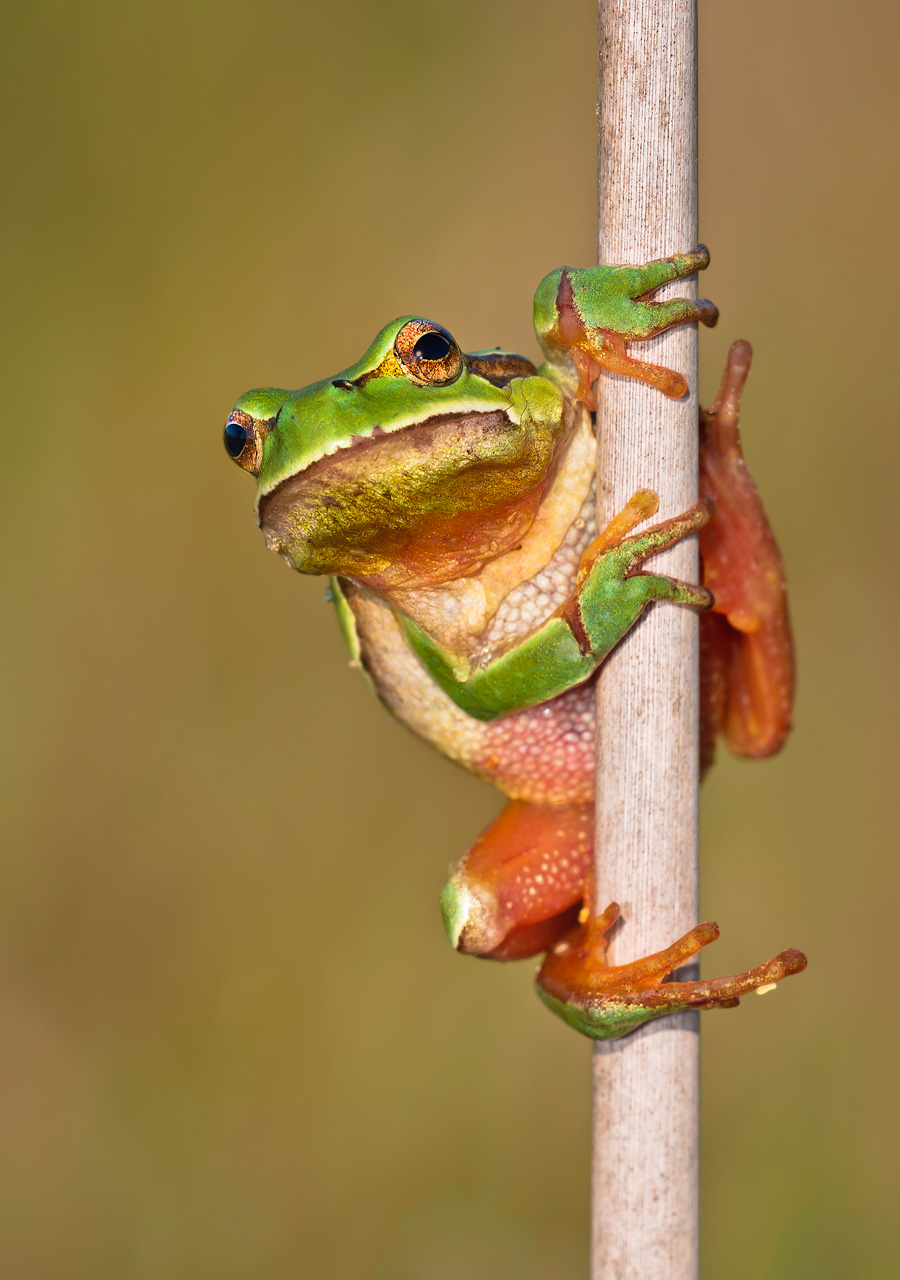

Scientific classification
- Kingdom: Animalia
- Phylum: Chordata
- Class: Amphibia
- Order: Anura
- Family: Hylidae
- Genus: Hyla
- Species: H. molleri

Binomial name
- Hyla molleri Bedriaga, 1889
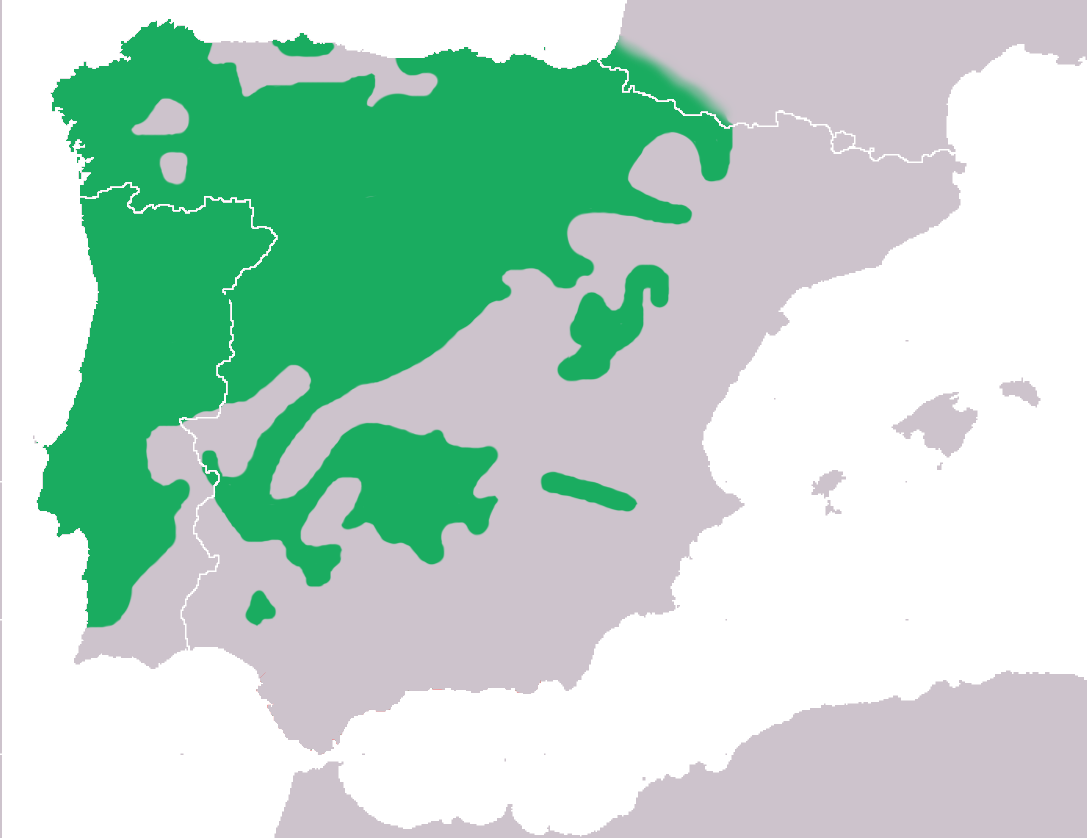

Synonyms
- Hyla arborea molleri Bedriaga, 1889

= Hyla molleri =

Iberian tree frog

Species of amphibian

Hyla molleri, also known as the Iberian tree frog or Moller's tree frog, is a species of frog in the family Hylidae, endemic to the Iberian Peninsula and southwesternmost France. It was formerly treated as a subspecies of Hyla arborea, but was split based on genetic differences. The specific name molleri honours Adolphe F. Moller (1842–1920), a Portuguese botanist.
