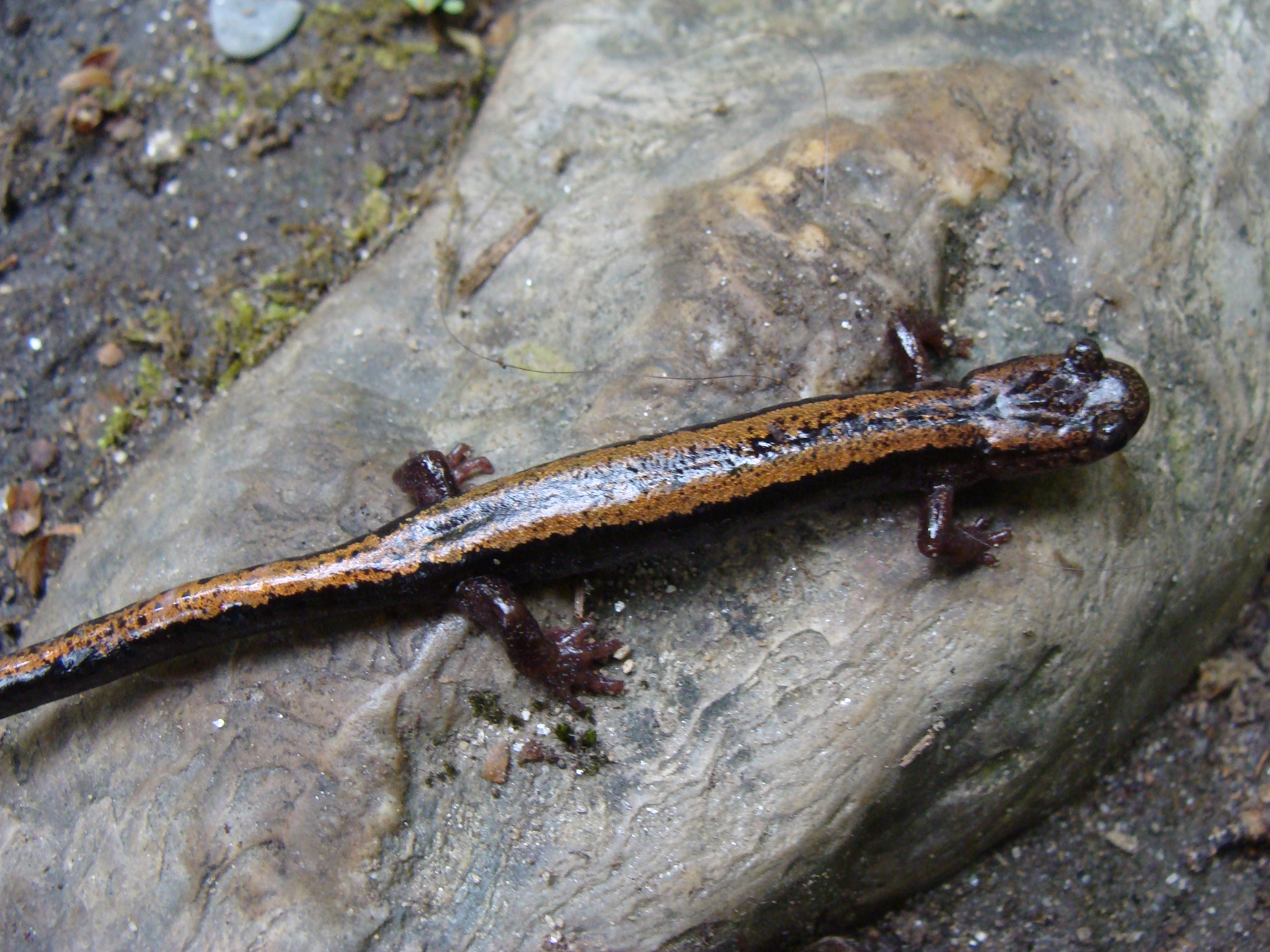

Conservation status
- Near Threatened (IUCN 3.1)

Scientific classification
- Kingdom: Animalia
- Phylum: Chordata
- Class: Amphibia
- Order: Urodela
- Family: Salamandridae
- Subfamily: Salamandrinae
- Genus: Chioglossa; Bocage, 1864
- Species: C. lusitanica

Binomial name
- Chioglossa lusitanica Bocage, 1864
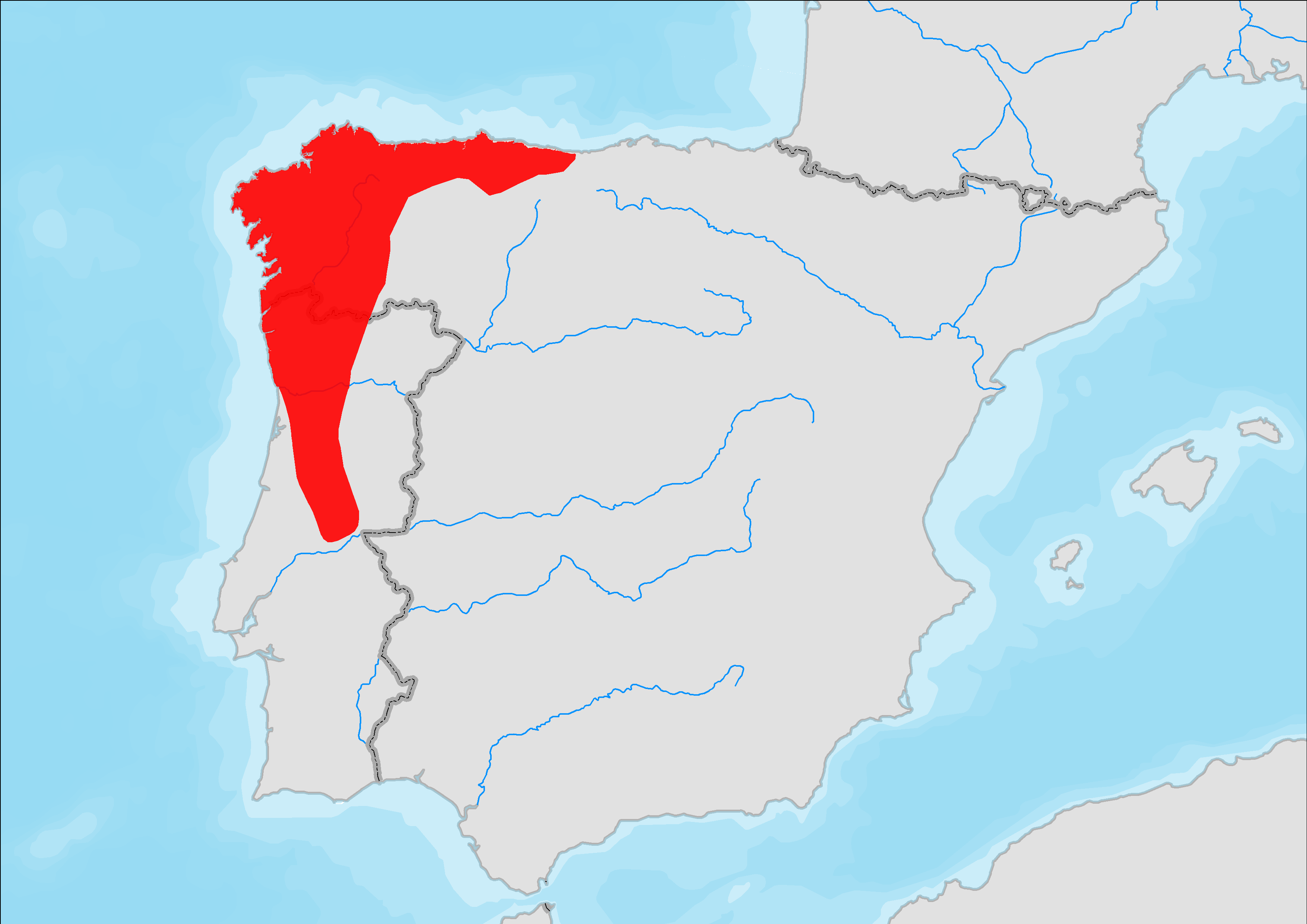
- Range map

= Gold-striped salamander =

Species of amphibian

The gold-striped salamander or golden-striped salamander (Chioglossa lusitanica) is a species of salamander in the family Salamandridae. It is the only species of the genus Chioglossa. It is found in the north-west of Iberia (in Portugal and Spain) at an altitude of up to 1,300 m (4,300 ft). It is threatened by habitat loss.

== Description ==
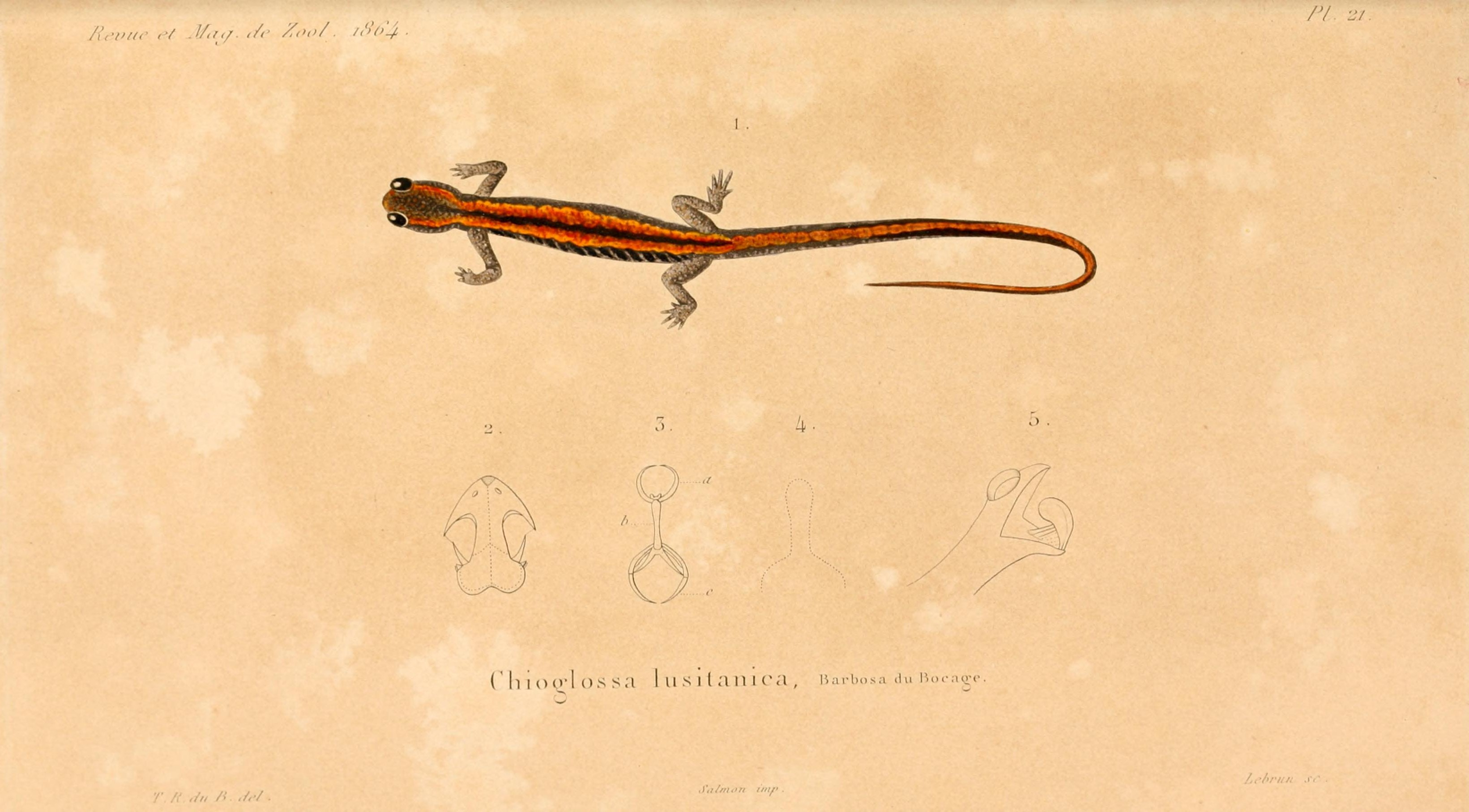
Original watercolour included in the first scientific description of the species by naturalist José Vicente Barbosa du Bocage in 1864

The gold-striped salamander is a short-legged salamander with protruding eyes and a tail that makes up 2/3 of its total length. It has a smooth upper side with 10-11 coastal grooves which are dark brown to blackish and usually two parallel golden stripes on the back which can sometimes be broken. It is an agile terrestrial amphibian, and is nocturnal. It may shed its tail like a lizard if it feels threatened, and lives for about eight to 10 years. It feeds primarily on invertebrates, using its sticky tongue to catch them. They mate on land with clutches of 12-20 eggs laid between stones in running water or on the walls of caves. The larvae develop in water.

The species has two described subspecies, C. l. lusitanica and C. l. longipes.

== Distribution and habitat ==
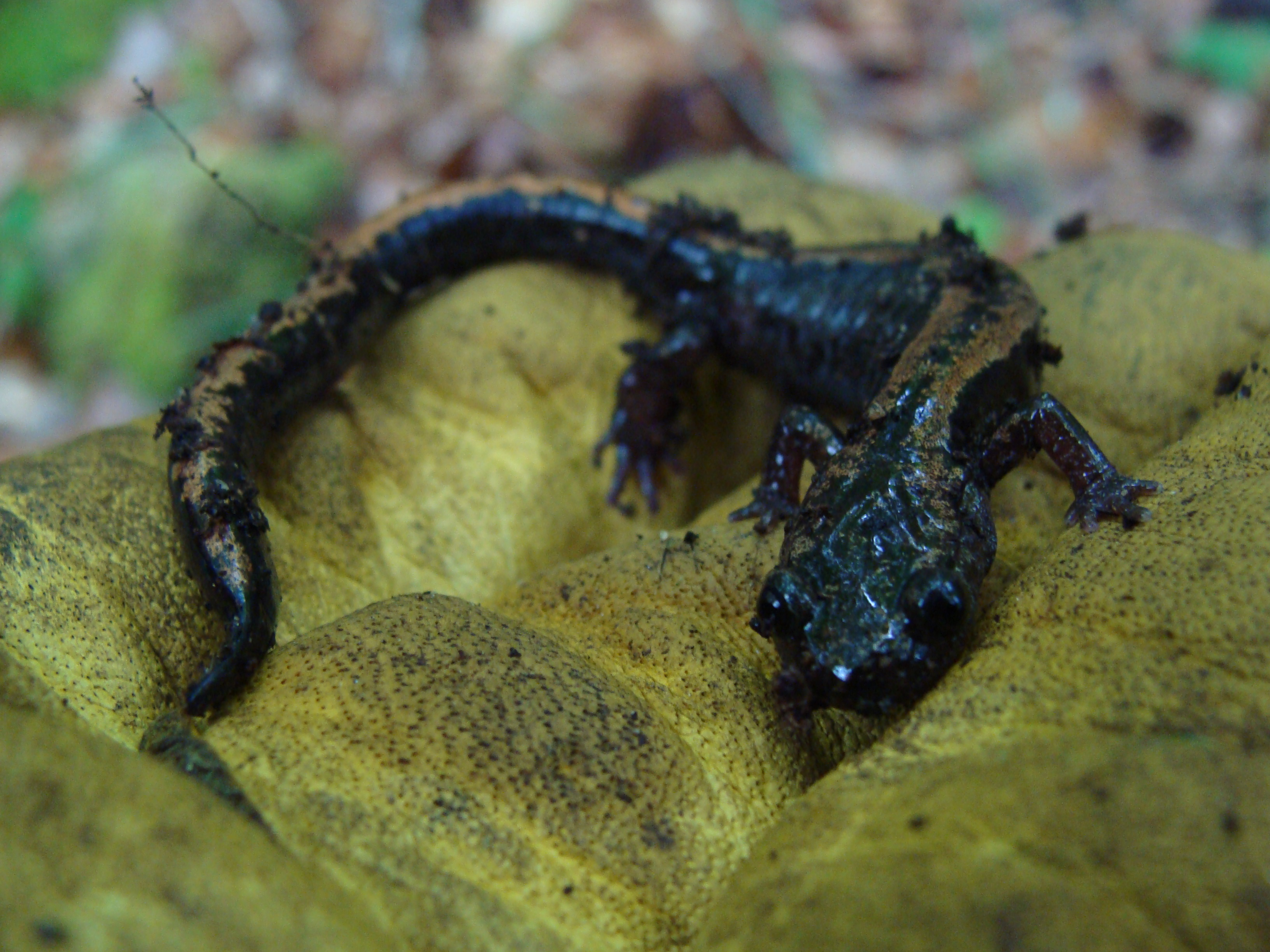
In Peneda-Gerês National Park, Portugal

Its natural habitat are moist deciduous forests near streams in mountainous areas of northwest Spain and north and central Portugal and has been introduced in the Sintra Mountains, but is also found in eucalypt plantations, pine forests and even shrubland. The species has also been recorded from caves and abandoned flooded mines.

It occurs in several protected areas including the Peneda-Gerês National Park, Portugal and the Picos de Europa National Park, Spain.

== Threats ==
The species is threatened by replacement of its habitat (especially in Spain) and fires (especially in Portugal).
