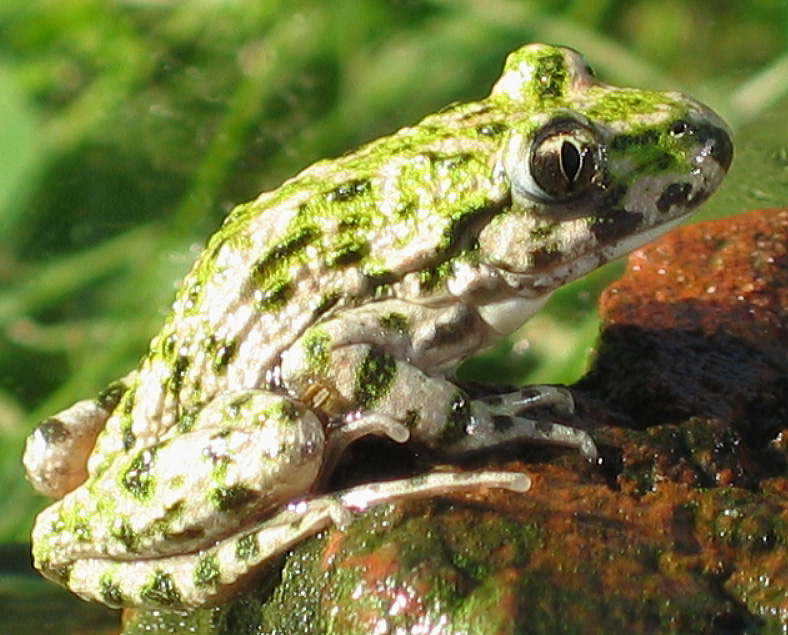
- Pelodytes punctatus

Scientific classification
- Kingdom: Animalia
- Phylum: Chordata
- Class: Amphibia
- Order: Anura
- Superfamily: Pelobatoidea
- Family: Pelodytidae; Bonaparte, 1850

Type genus
- Pelodytes Bonaparte, 1838

Synonyms
- Pelodytina Bonaparte, 1850; Pelodytides — Bruch, 1862; Pelodytidae — Cope, 1866; Pelodytinae — Fejérváry, 1923

= Pelodytidae =

Pelodytidae Temporal range: Early Eocene–recent, 50–0 Ma

Family of amphibians

Pelodytidae, also known as the parsley frogs, or rarely, mud divers, is a family of frogs. It contains a single extant genus, Pelodytes, and three genera only known from fossils. The extant species are found in southwestern Europe and the Caucasus.

== Genera ==
- Pelodytes Bonaparte, 1838 – 5 species, southwestern Europe and the Caucasus
- †Aerugoamnis Henrici, Baez & Grande, 2013 – 1 species, North America
- †Miopelodytes Taylor, 1941 – 1 species, North America
- †Tephrodytes Henrici, 1994 – 1 species, North America

== Evolutionary relationships ==
Most recent studies suggests that Pelodytidae belongs to a clade containing three other families: Pelobatidae, Scaphiopodidae, and Megophryidae. Its sister taxon is the clade Pelobatidae+Megophryidae, although older studies have suggested also other relationships.

== Description ==
Modern pelodytids are moderately small frogs measuring 30–55 mm (1.2–2.2 in) in snout–vent length. The eyes have rounded but vertically oriented pupils. The finger and the toe tips are blunt to pointed. The tadpoles have keratinized mouthparts. The family is also characterized by a number of anatomical and sceletal features, including the fusion of the tibiale and fibulare that have been used to include the fossil taxa Miopelodytes and Tephrodytes in this family.
