= French Way =

Way of St. James pilgrimage route in France

Coordinates: 43°09′44″N 1°14′14″W

- Camino Francés (Spanish)
- The French Way
- Interactive map of French Way
- Type: Pilgrims' way
- Location: From Saint-Jean-Pied-de-Port to Santiago de Compostela

UNESCO World Heritage Site
- Type: Cultural
- Criteria: ii, iv, vi
- Designated: 1993 (17th session)
- Part of: Routes of Santiago de Compostela: Camino Francés and Routes of Northern Spain
- Reference no.: 669bis-003
- Region: Europe and North America

The French Way (Galician: Camiño francés, Spanish: Camino francés, Basque: Frantses bidea) follows the GR 65 and is the most popular of the routes of the Way of St. James (Spanish: Camino de Santiago), the ancient pilgrimage route to Santiago de Compostela in Galicia, Spain. It runs from Saint-Jean-Pied-de-Port on the French side of the Pyrenees to Roncesvalles on the Spanish side and then another 780 kilometres (480 miles) on to Santiago de Compostela through the major cities of Pamplona, Logroño, Burgos and León. A typical walk on the Camino francés takes at least four weeks, allowing for one or two rest days on the way.

Paths from the cities of Tours, Vézelay, and Le Puy-en-Velay meet at Saint-Jean-Pied-de-Port. A fourth French route originates in Arles, in Provence, and crosses the French–Spanish frontier at a different point, between the Pyrenees towns of Somport and Canfranc. This fourth route follows the Aragonese Way and joins the French Way at Puente la Reina, south of Pamplona, in Navarre, about 700 kilometres from Santiago de Compostela.

In 1993, the French Way, along with the Spanish route of the Camino de Santiago was inscribed on the UNESCO World Heritage List for its historical importance in Christianity as a major pilgrimage route and its testimony to the exchange of ideas and cultures across its length.

Route of the busiest section from Sarria to Santiago de Compostela

== Statistics ==
The Pilgrim's Office in Santiago publishes data regarding pilgrims who got the certificate. In 2024 about 47% of pilgrims (over 235,000) took the French Way. 65% of the pilgrims on the Camino Frances started in Sarria while 14% started in Saint-Jean-Pied-de-Port. 49% of the pilgrims had a Spanish nationality, followed by US-Americans (8.3%), Italians (5.4%) and Koreans (2.8%). The nationalities differ regarding the starting point: In Saint-Jean-Pied-de-Port the vast majority of pilgrims (91%) is neither from France nor Spain. In contrast the majority of pilgrims using Sarria as a starting point is Spanish (64%).

94% of pilgrims did the journey on foot and 2% by bike. About 300 pilgrims travelled on a horse and 170 in a wheelchair. Most pilgrims finish their journey in a month between May and September.

== Example itinerary ==
Though there is no set itinerary for this route, daily stages from major town to major town could be walked as follows:

km from St-Jean	km to Santiago	Distance	Begins	Arrives	Passes through	Notes
0	769	25	Saint-Jean-Pied-de-Port (Donibane Garazi), France	Orreaga/Roncesvalles, Spain	Luzaide/Valcarlos	Crosses the border of France and Spain in the western Pyrenees.
25	744	21.5	Orreaga/Roncesvalles	Zubiri	Auritz/Burguete, Aurizberri/Espinal, Bizkarreta-Gerendiain, Lintzoain	
46.5	722.5	22	Zubiri	Pamplona/Iruña	Larrasoaña, Villava/Atarrabia	
68.5	700.5	23.5	Pamplona/Iruña	Puente la Reina/Gares	Cizur/Zizur, Uterga, Obanos	Joined by the Aragonese Way just before Puente la Reina.
92	677	22	Puente la Reina/Gares	Estella-Lizarra	Cirauqui/Zirauki, Villatuerta	
114	655	22	Estella-Lizarra	Los Arcos	Villamayor de Monjardín	
136	633	28	Los Arcos	Logroño	Torres del Río, Sansol, Viana	Leaving the province of Navarre, entering La Rioja
164	605	29	Logroño	Nájera	Navarrete, Ventosa	
193	576	21	Nájera	Santo Domingo de la Calzada	Azofra	
214	555	23	Santo Domingo de la Calzada	Belorado	Grañón, Redecilla del Camino	Leaving La Rioja, entering the Province of Burgos, Castille and León
237	532	24	Belorado	San Juan de Ortega	Tosantos, Villafranca Montes de Oca	
261	508	28	San Juan de Ortega	Burgos	Agés, Atapuerca, Olmos de Atapuerca	
289	480	20	Burgos	Hornillos del Camino	Villalbilla de Burgos, Tardajos, Rabé de las Calzadas	
309	460	20	Hornillos del Camino	Castrojeriz	San Bol, Hontanas	
329	440	23	Castrojeriz	Frómista	Itero del Castillo, Puente de Fitero, Itero de la Vega, Boadilla del Camino	Leaving the province of Burgos, entering Palencia
352	417	19	Frómista	Carrión de los Condes	Población de Campos, Villacázar de Sirga	
371	398	17	Carrión de los Condes	Calzadilla de la Cueza		
388	381	22	Calzadilla de la Cueza	Sahagún	Ledigos, Terradillo del los Templarios, San Nicolás del Real Camino	
410	359	19.5	Sahagún	El Burgo Ranero	Calzada del Coto, Bercianos del Real Camino	
429.5	339.5	19	El Burgo Ranero	Mansilla de las Mulas	Reliegos	
448.5	320.5	19	Mansilla de las Mulas	León		
467.5	301.5	24	León	Villadangos del Páramo		
491.5	277.5	28	Villadangos del Páramo	Astorga	San Martín del Camino, Hospital de Órbigo, Santibáñez de Valdeiglesias	
519.5	249.5	20	Astorga	Rabanal del Camino	Murias de Rechivaldo, Santa Catalina de Somoza, El Ganso	
539.5	229.5	16.5	Rabanal del Camino	El Acebo	Manjarin	
556	213	16	El Acebo	Ponferrada	Riego de Ambros, Molinaseca	Highest point of trail, 1515 metres above sea level, near Manjarin.
572	197	23	Ponferrada	Villafranca del Bierzo	Cacabelos	
595	174	25	Villafranca del Bierzo	La Faba	Pereje, Trabadelo, La Portela de Valcarce, Vega de Valcarce, Ruitelan	
620	149	24	La Faba	Fillobal	O Cebreiro, Hospital de la Condesa, Fonfría	Crosses from León into Galicia.
644	125	17.5	Fillobal	Sarria	Triacastela, Samos, Calvor	
661.5	107.5	21	Sarria	Portomarín	Barbadelo, Fereiros	The last point at which a pilgrim can start the journey on foot or horseback and still complete the 100 km needed to claim the compostela.
682.5	86.5	24.5	Portomarín	Palas de Rei	Gonzar, Ventas de Naró, Ligonde	
707	62	25.5	Palas de Rei	Arzúa	Casanova, Leboreiro, Melide, Ribadiso da Baixo	
732.5	36.5	20	Arzúa	O Pedrouzo	Santa Irene	
752.5	16.5	16.5	O Pedrouzo	Santiago de Compostela	Monte do Gozo	

== Films ==
The four branches of the Way of St. James

- The Way (2010)
- Buen Camino (2025)

== Books ==
- Spanish Steps (2004)
