= Roncevaux Pass =

Mountain pass in the Spanish Pyrenees

Roncesvalles Pass
- Ronceval Pass; Roncevaux Pass; Ibañetako Mendatea (Basque)
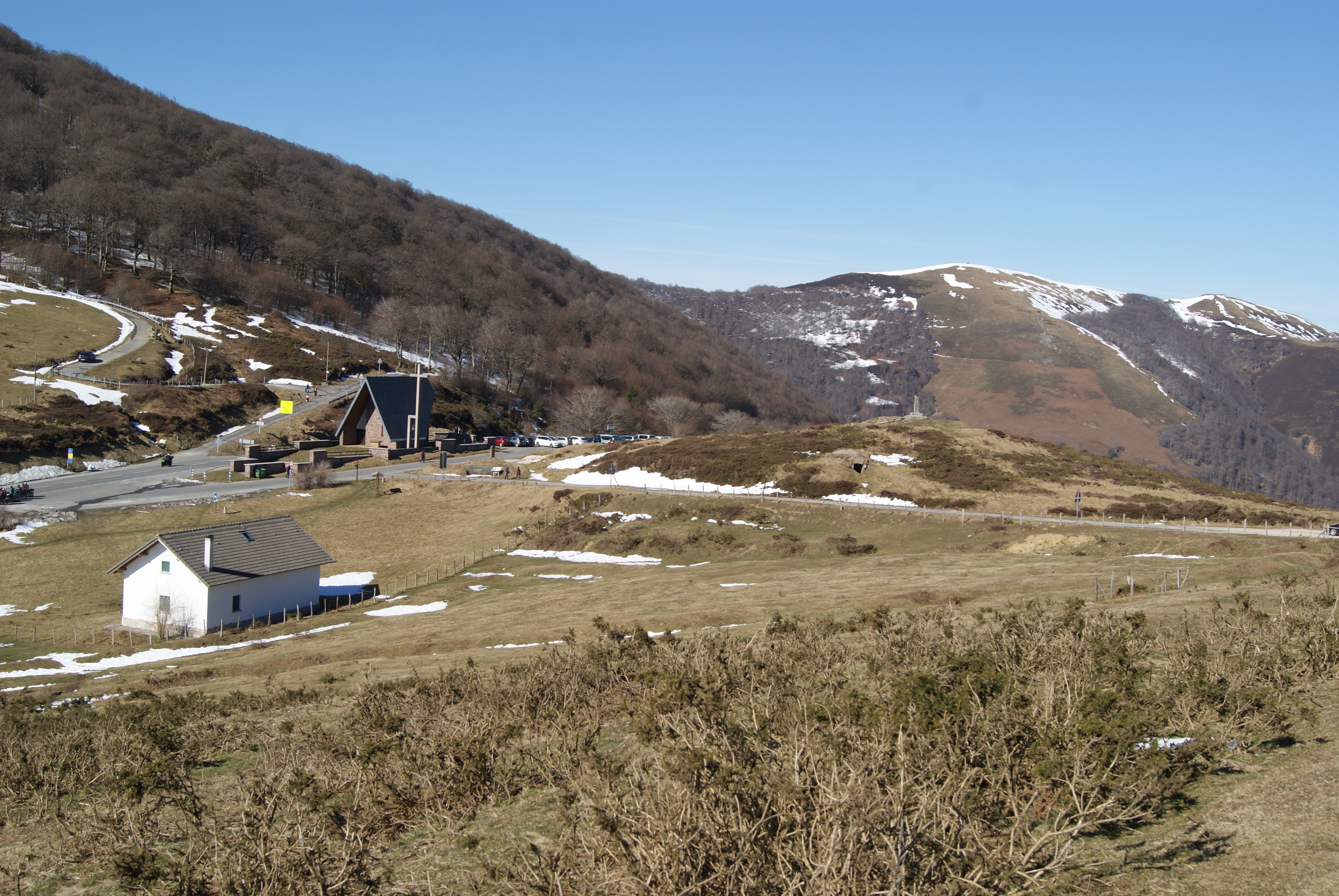

- Location within Spain
- Elevation: 1,057 m (3,468 ft)
- Traversed by: N135 road, Camino Francés

Third Approach
- Location: Navarre, Spain
- Range: Pyrenees
- Coordinates: 43°01′13″N 1°19′26″W

Roncesvalles Pass, Ronceval Pass or Roncevaux Pass (Spanish: Puerto de Ibañeta; Basque: Ibañetako Mendatea; French: Col de Roncevaux; Occitan: Còl de Roncesvals or Pòrt de Roncesvaus; elevation 1057 m) is a high mountain pass in the Pyrenees near the border between France and Spain. The pass itself is entirely in Spain.

== Location ==
The pass is located between the towns of Roncesvalles and Luzaide/Valcarlos in Navarra, northern Spain. The closest town in France is Saint-Jean-Pied-de-Port, at a distance of about 8 km (5.0 mi) from the Spanish border. It has customarily been an important point on the Santiago de Compostela pilgrimage route.

The route over the pass departs from Lintzoain on the Spanish side and from Saint-Jean-Pied-de-Port on the French side.

The pass divides the valley of the Nive on the north from the valley of the Irati on the south.

== History ==
=== Battle of Roncesvalles (778) ===
In 778, Roland, the warden of the Breton March, had accompanied Charlemagne on his campaign into the Iberian peninsula across the Western Pyrenees. Einhard, the biographer of Charlemagne, mentions in his Vita Karoli Magni a fatal event involving Vasconian raiders who laid an ambush by hiding in the woods on top of a high mountain while Frankish troops were crossing the mountain pass. Subsequently, the raiders attacked the rear guards of the Frankish army on their way down into the valley. According to Einhard, Eggihard, the King's steward; Anselm ("Anshelmus"), Count Palatine; and Roland ("Hruodlandus"), Governor of the March of Brittany, with very many others, lost their lives during that ambush.

According to tradition, Roncesvalles is the site where this event took place in 778, and hence today the battle is called Battle of Roncesvalles. There is a stone monument near the pass commemorating the area where it is traditionally held that Roland died.

Nonetheless, the inhabitants of Valcarlos continue to claim that Valcarlos is the historic site where the battle of 778 took place because Charlemagne's troops were on their way back into the Frankish realm.

=== Battle of Roncesvalles (824) ===
The battle in 824, sometimes called the Second Battle of Roncevaux Pass, was a battle in which a combined Basque-Qasawi Muslim army defeated a Carolingian military expedition in 824. The battle took place only 46 years after the first Battle of Roncevaux Pass (778) in a confrontation showing similar features: a Basque force engaging from the mountains a northbound expedition led by the Franks, and the same geographical setting (the Roncevaux Pass or a spot nearby).

The battle resulted in the defeat of the Carolingian military expedition and the capture of its commanders Aeblus and Aznar Sánchez in 824. The clash was to have further reaching consequences than those of the 778 engagement: the immediate establishment of the independent Kingdom of Pamplona, a landmark in Basque history.

=== Battle of Roncesvalles (1813) ===
On 25 July 1813, a battle between French Napoleonic troops and Anglo-Portuguese forces took place at the Roncesvalles Pass during the Peninsular War (1808–1814). This Battle of Roncesvalles ended in an Anglo-Portuguese defeat.

== Gallery ==
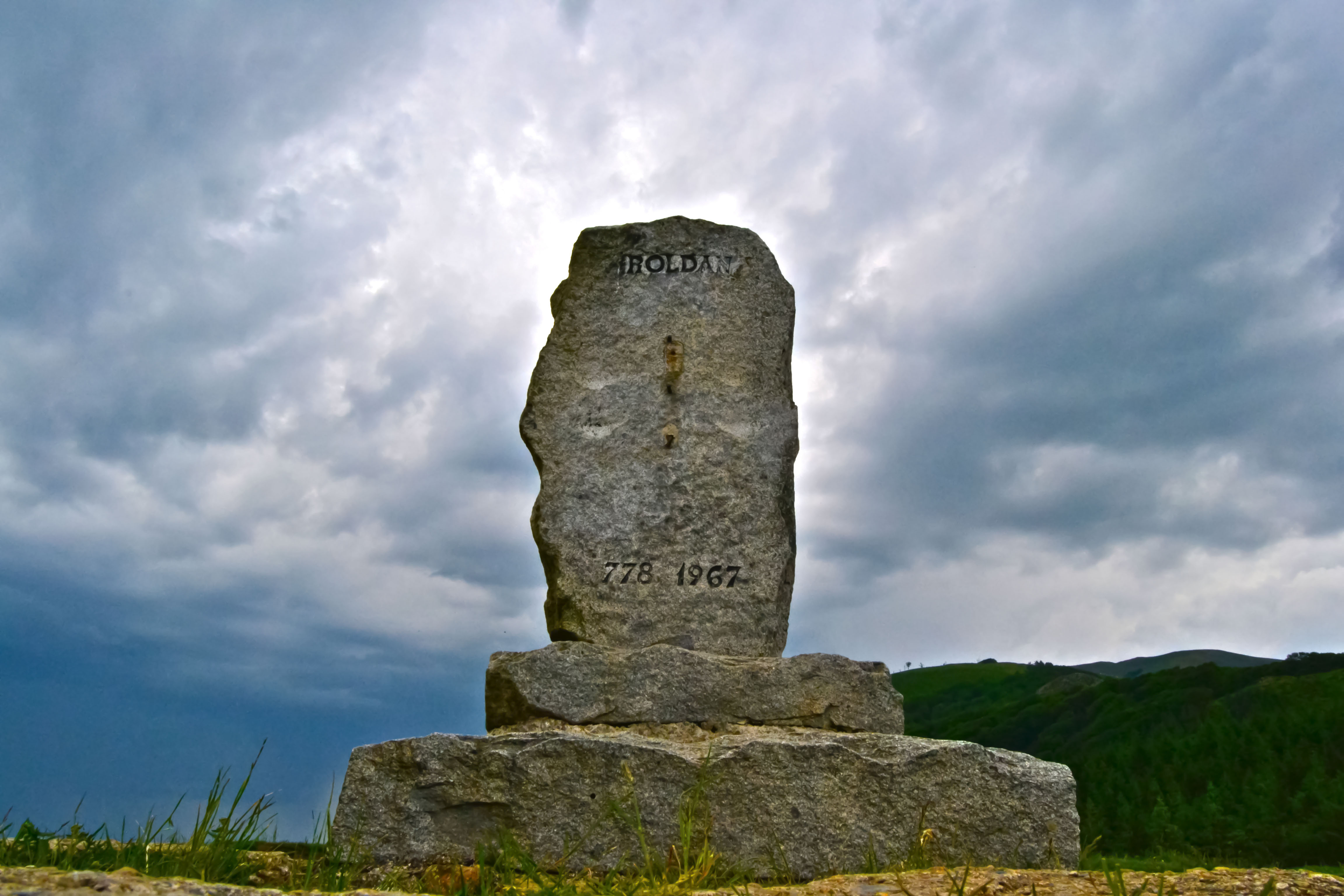
Monument at the Roncesvalles Pass

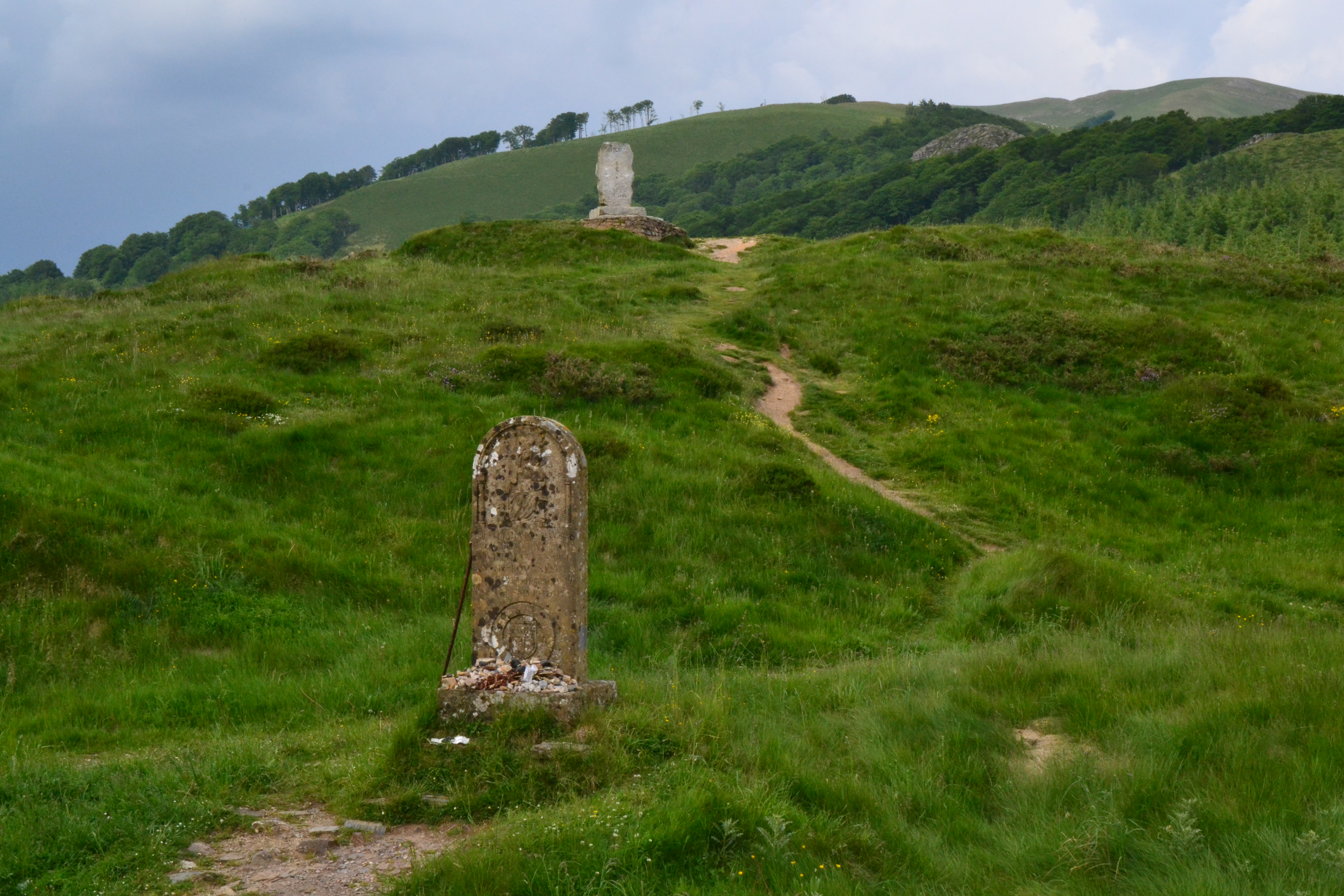
Pass of Roncesvalles or Ibañeta mountain pass.

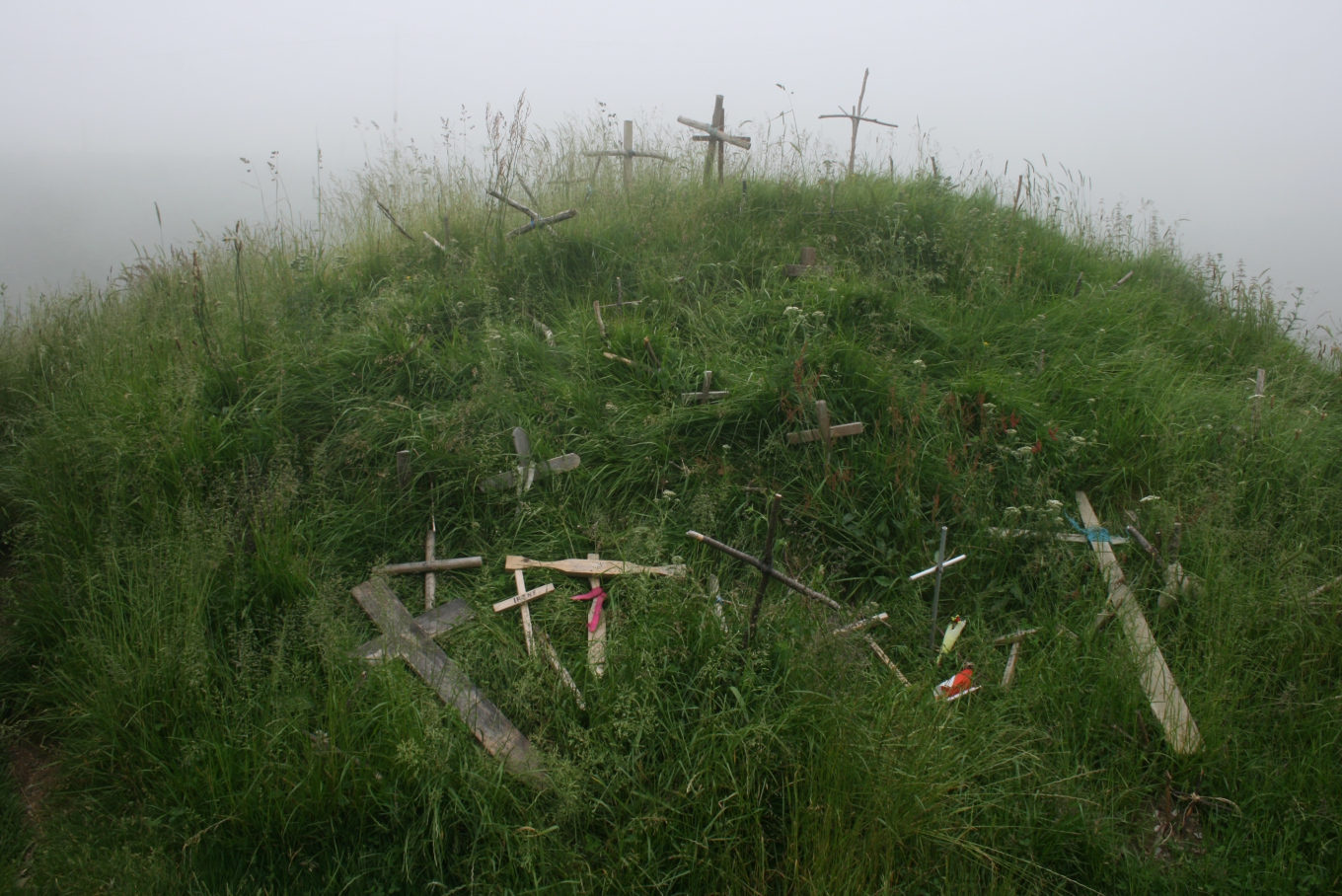
Votive crosses at the pass.

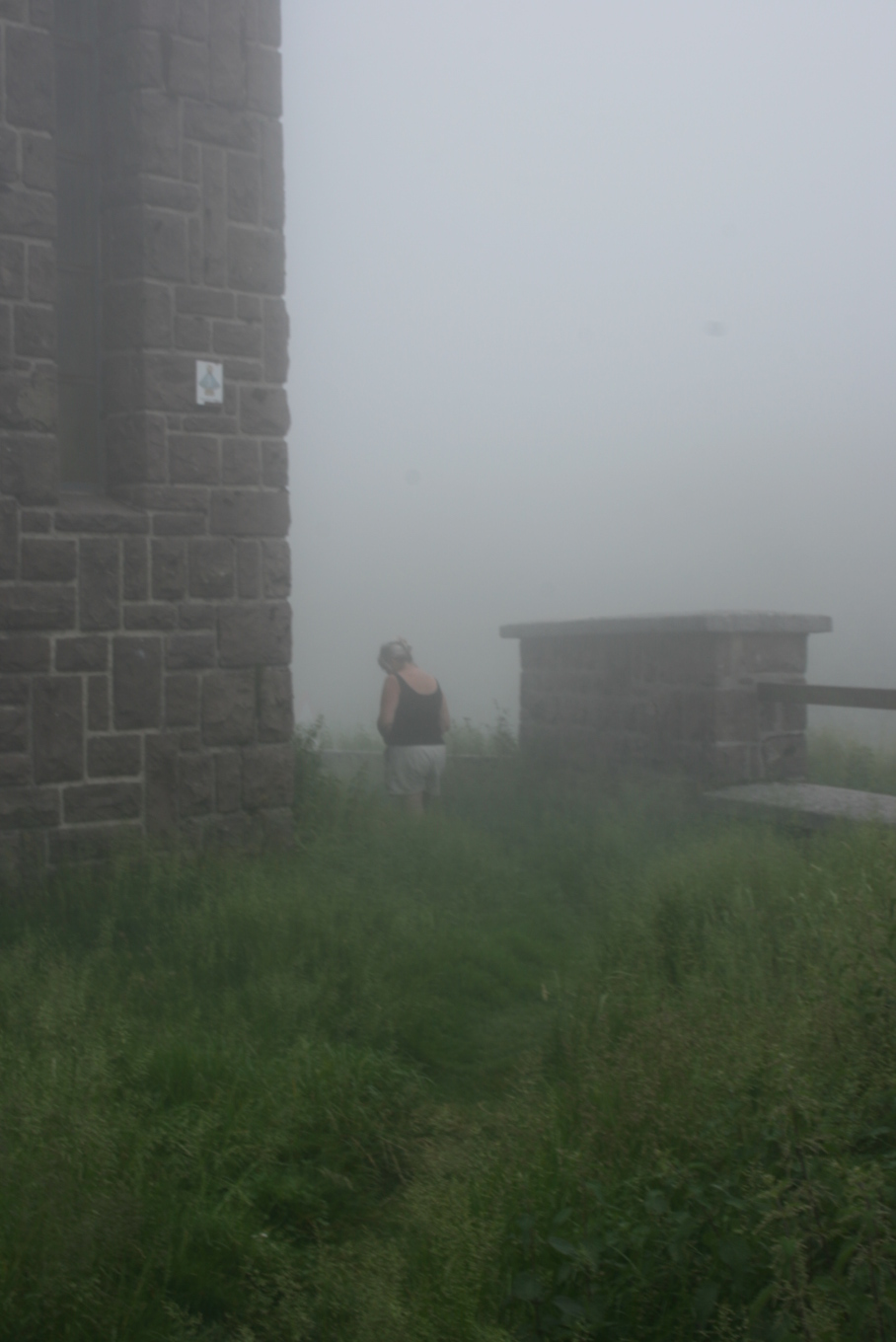
The chapel at the Pass of Roncesvalles

== See also ==
- Brecha de Rolando
- Roncesvalles Avenue
- The Song of Roland
