= Acebo =

Acebo may refer to:

- Acebo (river), northern Spain
- Acebo, Cáceres, Spain
- El Acebo, village in Molinaseca, El Bierzo, Spain
- Alexander V. Acebo (1927–2019), American politician
