= Arga (river) =

River in Spain

Arga (Runa)
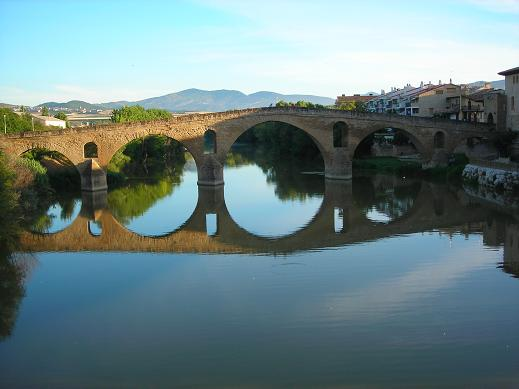
- Bridge (early 11th century) over the Arga river at Puente La Reina

Location
- Country: Spain
- Region: Navarre
- City: Pamplona

Physical characteristics
- Source
  - location: near Esteribar
- Mouth
  - location: Aragón River
  - coordinates: 42°17′48″N 1°47′7″W
- Length: 145 km (90 mi)
- Discharge
  - average: 59.76 m^{3}/s (2,110 cu ft/s)

Basin features
- Progression: Ebro→ Balearic Sea

The Arga is a river of Navarre, in Spain, and is a tributary of the Aragón River, itself a tributary of the river Ebro. The Arga was known as the river Runa in antiquity. Situated in the north-east of Spain, the river stretches some 145 kilometres (90 mi) and has a basin of 2,759 square kilometres (1,065 mi^{2}), of which 2,652 square kilometres (1,024 mi^{2}) is in Navarre and the remaining 107 square kilometres (41 mi^{2}) is in the province of Alava. The source of the river is to the north of the village Esteríbar, near the border with France, and it empties into the Aragón River near Funes.

The river is dammed in the Eugui reservoir near Esteríbar; the dam principally serves the needs of Pamplona's metropolitan area, the largest city on the Arga.

== Vegetation ==
At the upper basin, the river is mainly surrounded by beech trees and beneath these grow bilberries, Cornish heath, sedges and luzulas. Additionally, a variety of shrubs can be found in the proximity of the Eugui reservoir, including; alder, ash, maple, common hazel and buckthorn. After the dam, the lower river is lined with oak and Scots pine trees and boxwood shrubs.

At the point where the river passes Huarte/Uharte, a crack willow appears. The shrubbery around the area of Belascoáin marks the change from Cantabrian forest to more Mediterranean plant life; black poplar and white willow are common in this region.

== See also ==
- List of rivers of Spain
