= Lintzoain =

- village
- Lintzoain
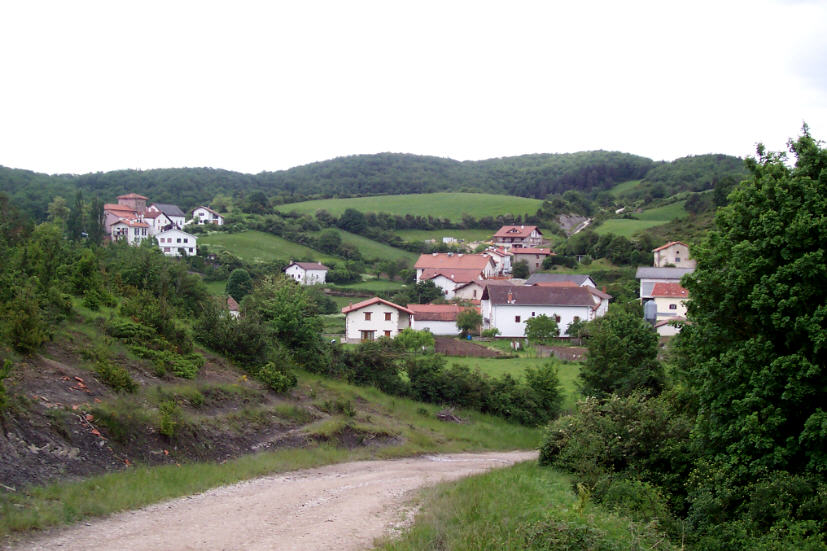
- Lintzoain view from the Way of St. James

- Seal

- Location within Navarre
- Coordinates: 42°57′46″N 1°26′14″W
- Country: Spain
- Province: Navarre
- Municipality: Erroibar

Government
  - Type: Concejo

Area
  - Total: 6.58 km^{2} (2.54 sq mi)
- Elevation: 749 m (2,457 ft)

Population (2020)
  - Total: 67
  - Density: 10.18/km^{2} (26.4/sq mi)
- Time zone: UTC+1 (CET)
  - Summer (DST): UTC+2 (CEST)
- Postal code: 31696

Lintzoain is a town located in Erroibar valley, in province and chartered community of Navarre, northern Spain.

The Way of St. James passes through it after Bizkarreta-Gerendiain and before Zubiri, in the neighbouring Esteribar valley.
