= Larrasoaña =

- Village
- Larrasoaña
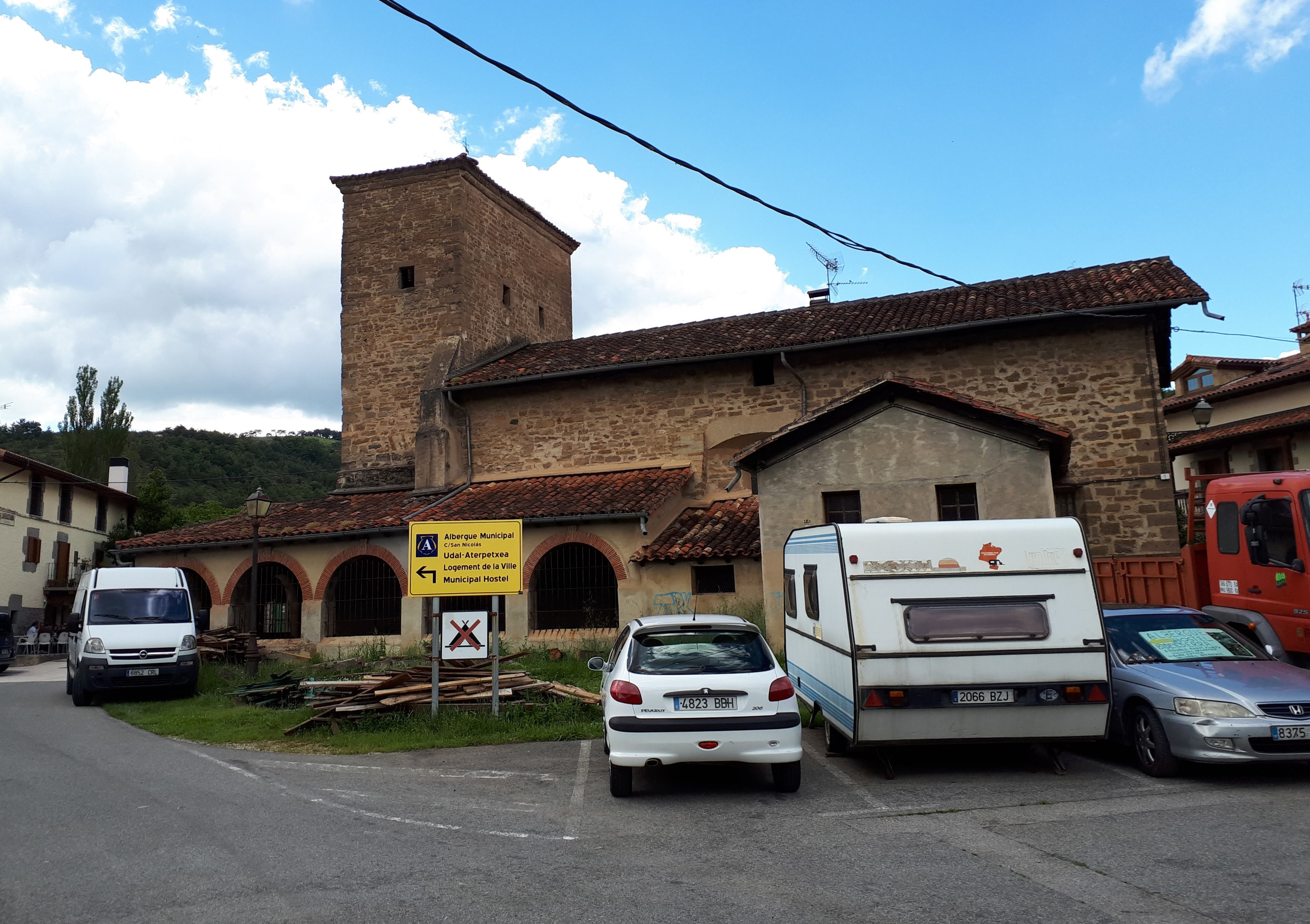

- Seal

- Location within Navarre Location within Spain
- Coordinates: 42°54′08″N 1°32′29″W
- Country: Spain
- Province: Navarre
- Municipality: Esteríbar

Population (2014)
  - Total: 138
- Time zone: UTC+1 (CET)
  - Summer (DST): UTC+2 (CEST)

Larrasoaña is a village in Navarre, Spain, located within the municipality of Esteríbar. The village is located on the French Way path of the Camino de Santiago.
