= GR 65 =

Long-distance working route

Coordinates: 44.8413°N 3.4951°E

GR 65 Grande Randonnée 65
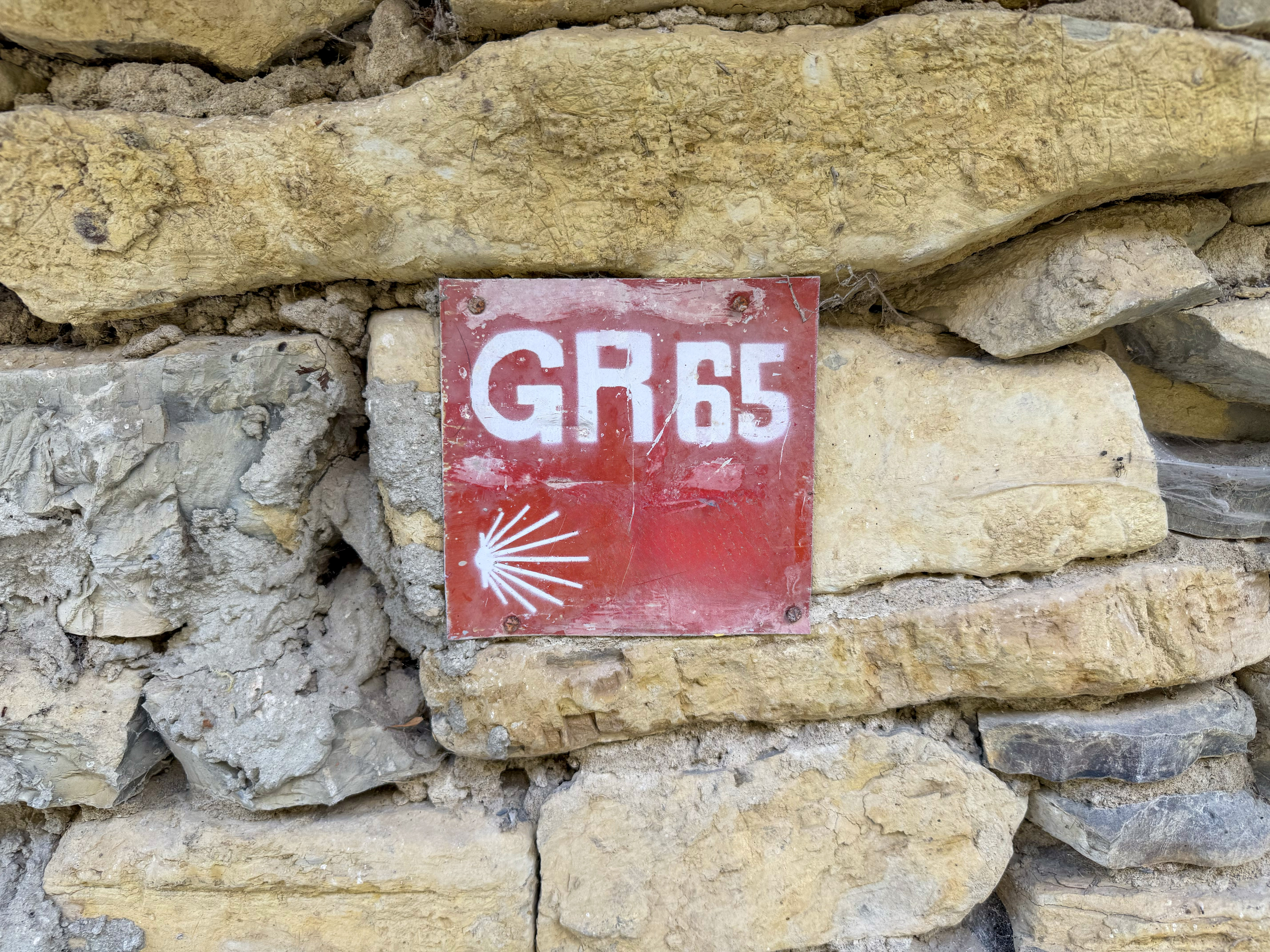
- GR 65 trail marker along the Camino de Santiago
- Location: Switzerland, France, Spain
- Designation: GR footpath, E3
- Trailheads: Geneva, Roncevalles
- Use: Hiking

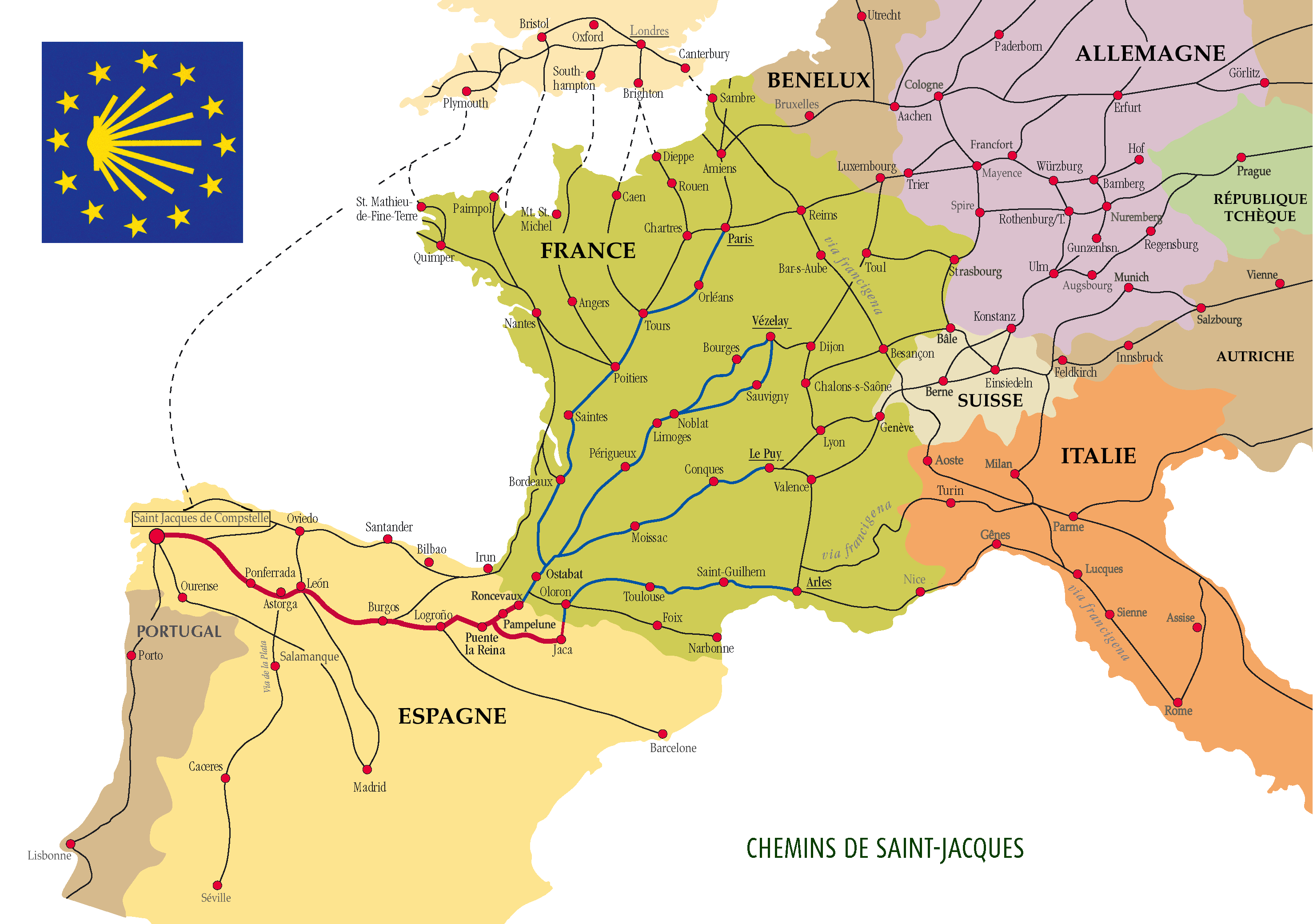
The Way of St. James through Europe

The GR 65 is a long-distance walking route of the Grande Randonnée network that extends from the French Prealps, across south central France, through the Pyrenees.

The French name for this GR route is the Chemin de Saint-Jacques and the Spanish name is the Camino de Santiago francés, because the GR 65 is an important variant route of the old Christian pilgrimage to Santiago de Compostela, one of several variants of the Way of St. James. In English it is the French Way, sometimes called The Le Puy Route or by its Latin name Via Podiensis, including its subtrails GR651 and GR652.

The GR 65 is part of the system of European long-distance paths known as E3 European long distance path.

The route starts in Geneva, Switzerland, and continues through France to La Côte-Saint-André (Isère), Le Puy-en-Velay (Haute-Loire), Nasbinals (Lozère), Conques (Aveyron), Figeac (Lot), Cahors (Lot) Moissac (Tarn-et-Garonne), and Aire-sur-l'Adour (Landes), to Roncesvalles, Spain.
