= County of Mansilla =

The title of Count of Mansilla (Conde de Mansilla) originates from the 17th century. The first Count of Mansilla was Antonio Campuzano y Riva Herrera in 1689. Successive Counts have been involved in Spanish politics, especially during the 20th century. One member of the Campuzano family was in exile with the Count of Barcelona in Estoril, when the Count of Barcelona was forced to remain away from Spain after the Spanish Civil War. One of the Counts of Mansilla's brothers fought alongside the Nationalist forces in the civil war, dying in the Battle of the Ebro.

The family estate is located in the province of Santander; however, the title originates from a town in the province of León known as Mansilla de las Mulas.
