= La Higa =

Coordinates: 42.6969°N 1.5299°W

Higa (spanish: La Higa) is a mountain in Monreal, Navarre, Spain, to the southeast of Pamplona. It marks the southern tip of the Alaitz mountain range, which forms part of the Pyrenees.

At the peak of La Higa (at 1,289 metres (4,229 ft)) can be found the hermitage of Santa Bárbara, the patron saint of Monreal. There is also a 50 KW repeater antenna for RNE. At the foot of the mountain is the village of Monreal, which forms part of the Camino de Santiago. In the past, Monreal was used as a hunting base by the Kings of Navarre.
