= Puente la Reina, Navarre =

Municipality of Navarre, Spain

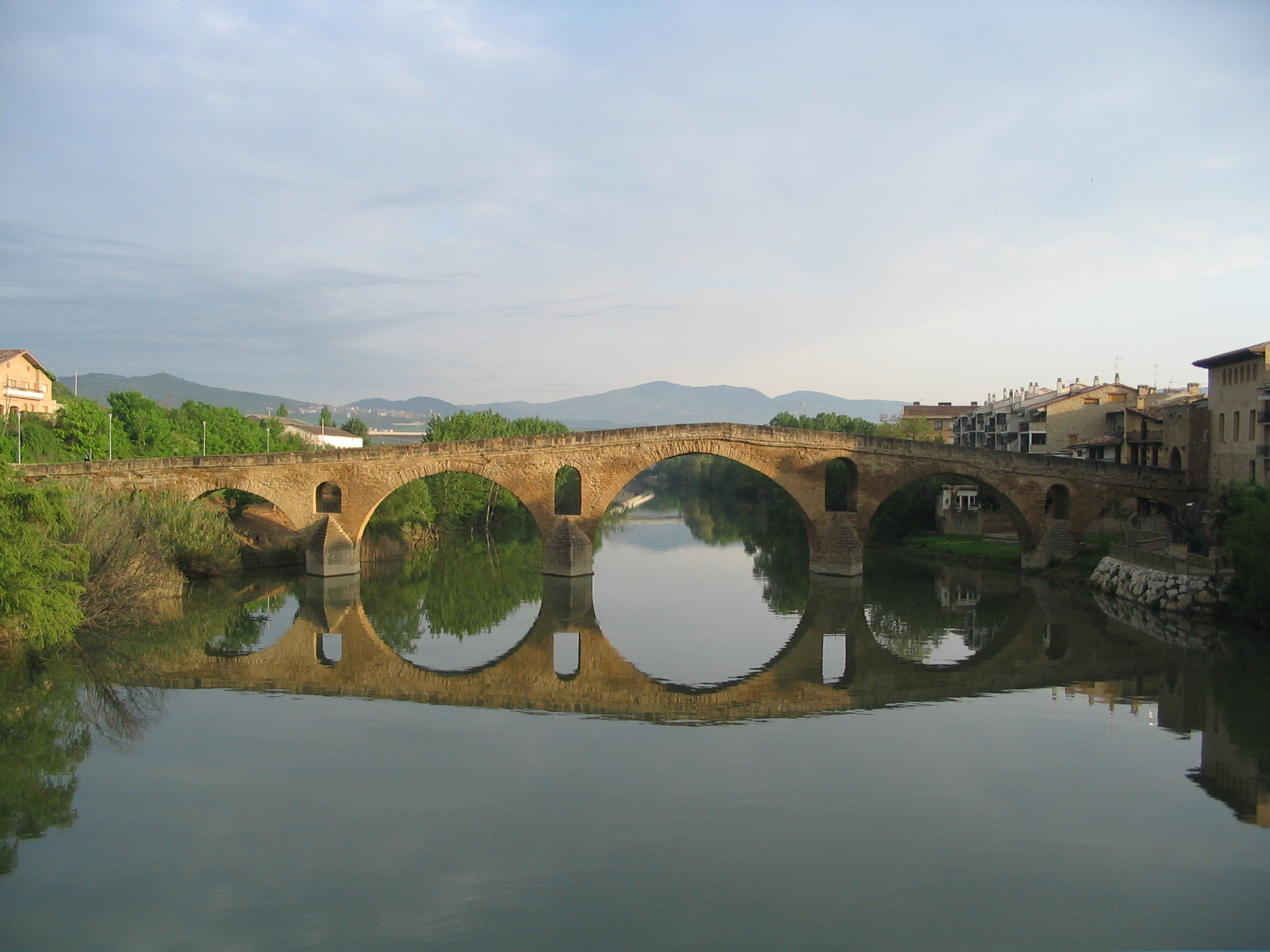

Puente la Reina (Spanish meaning "the Queen's bridge"; Basque: Gares) is a town and municipality located in the autonomous community of Navarre, in northern Spain.

Puente la Reina lies between Pamplona and Estella on the Way of St. James pilgrimage route to Santiago de Compostela. It is the first town after the junction of the French Way (Spanish: Camino Francés), the most popular route, and Aragonese Way.

== Romanesque bridge ==
Queen Muniadona, wife of King Sancho III was the queen who the names of the bridge and the town refers to. This 11th Century bridge is also known as the Puente Románico. She had the six-arched Romanesque bridge (42.671117°N 1.818736°W) built over the Arga for the use of pilgrims on their way to Santiago de Compostela along the Camino de Santiago.

== Demography ==
Historical population
Year	1991	1996	2001	2004	2017
Pop.	2,124	2,120	2,412	2,546	2,805
±%	—	−0.2%	+13.8%	+5.6%	+10.2%
