= Hornillos del Camino =

Coordinates: 42°20′N 3°55′W

- Municipality
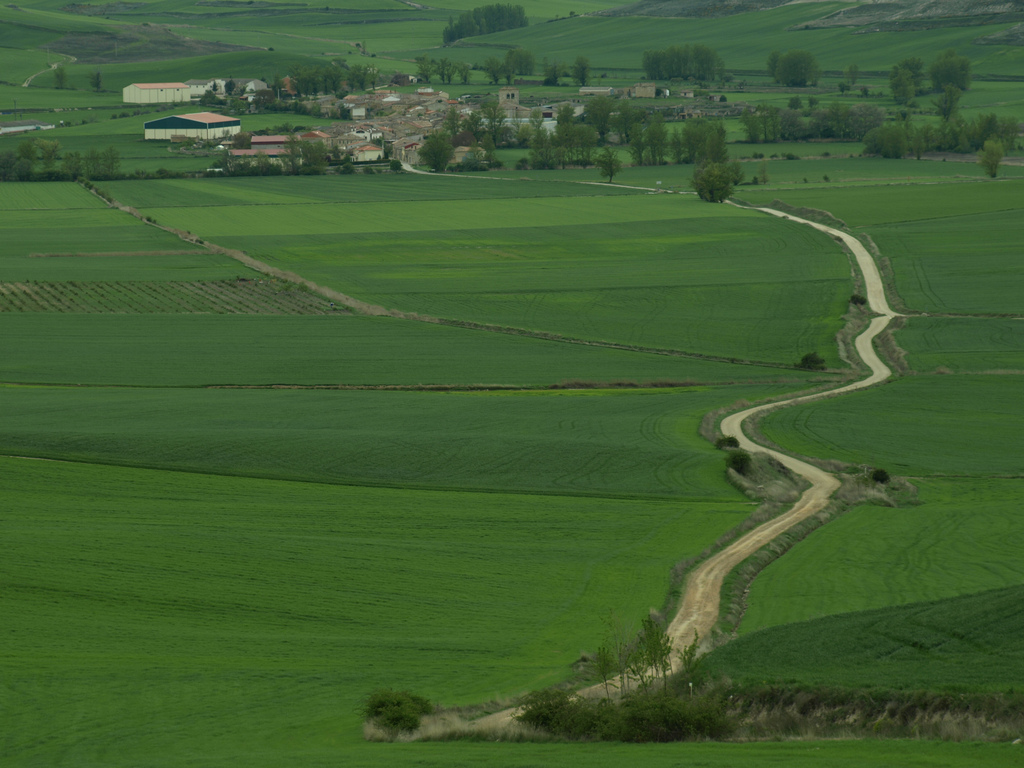
- View of Hornillos del Camino from Matamulos

- Coat of arms
- Interactive map of Hornillos del Camino
- Country: Spain
- Autonomous community: Castile and León
- Province: Burgos
- Comarca: Odra-Pisuerga

Area
  - Total: 14 km^{2} (5.4 sq mi)
- Elevation: 825 m (2,707 ft)

Population (2025-01-01)
  - Total: 44
  - Density: 3.1/km^{2} (8.1/sq mi)
- Time zone: UTC+1 (CET)
  - Summer (DST): UTC+2 (CEST)
- Postal code: 09230
- Website: http://www.hornillosdelcamino.es/

Hornillos del Camino is a municipality located in the province of Burgos, Castile and León, Spain. According to the 2004 census (INE), the municipality has a population of 70 inhabitants.

The town is along the French Way, the most popular of the routes of the Way of St. James, the ancient pilgrimage route.
