= Mansilla de las Mulas =

Mansilla de las Mulas Mansiella de las Mulas
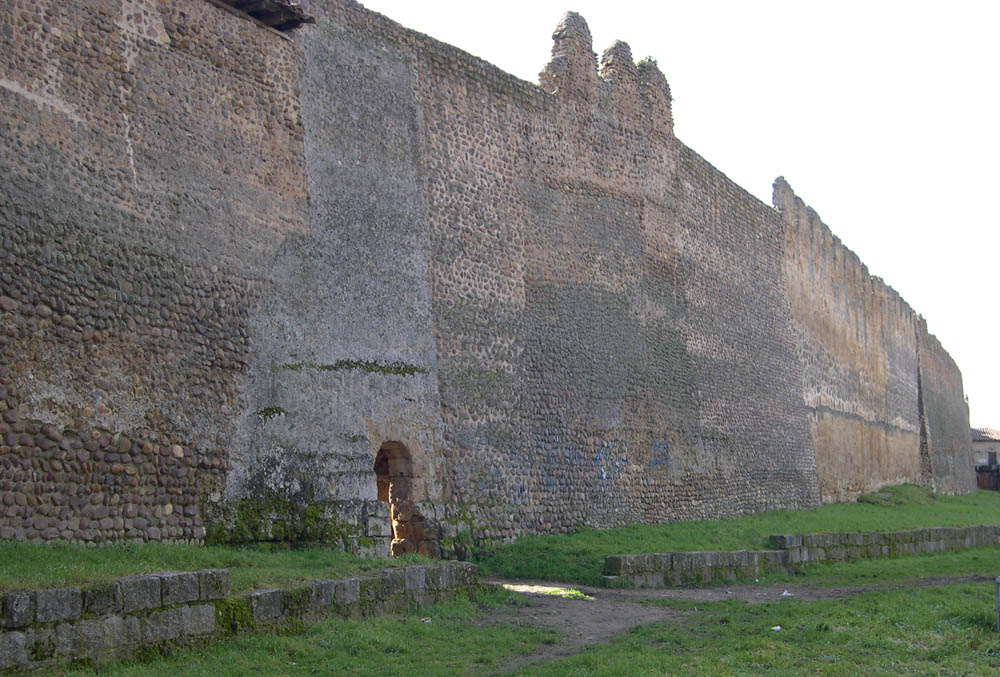
- Wall of Mansilla de las Mulas

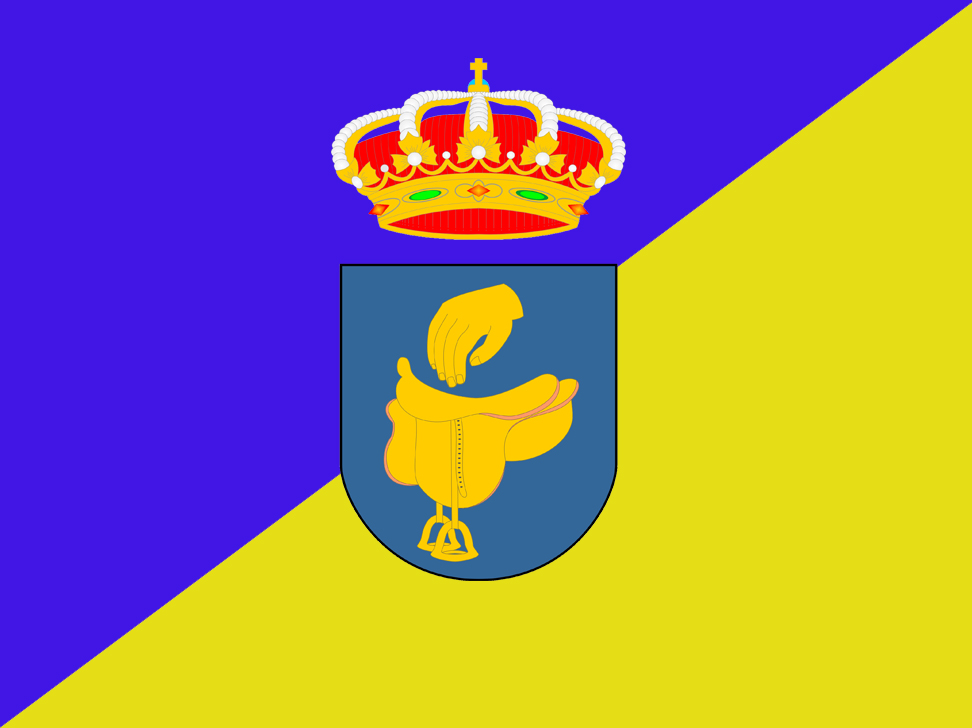
- Flag Coat of arms

- Location within Spain
- Coordinates: 42°29′51″N 5°24′59″W
- Country: Spain
- Autonomous community: Castile and León
- Province: León
- Municipality: Mansilla de las Mulas

Government
  - Mayor: María de la Paz Díez Martínez (PP)

Area
  - Total: 35.36 km^{2} (13.65 sq mi)
- Elevation: 795 m (2,608 ft)

Population (2025-01-01)
  - Total: 1,706
  - Density: 48.25/km^{2} (125.0/sq mi)
- Demonym(s): mansillés, mansillesa
- Time zone: UTC+1 (CET)
  - Summer (DST): UTC+2 (CEST)
- Postal Code: 24210, 24218
- Telephone prefix: 987
- Website: Ayto. de Mansilla de las Mulas

Mansilla de las Mulas (Spanish pronunciation: [manˈsiʎa ðe las ˈmulas]), Mansiella in Leonese language, is a municipality located in the province of León, Castile and León, Spain. According to the 2024 census (INE), the municipality has a population of 1,663 inhabitants.

The town is on the French Way, the most popular path of the Camino de Santiago. The medieval bridge over the Esla River is an essential crossing point for the pilgrims leaving Mansilla de las Mulas on their way to León.

Museum of the Leonese Peoples is erected over the archaeological remains of the former convent of San Agustín of Mansilla de las Mulas. It guards over 8,000 ethnographic pieces.

== Language ==
Mansilla City Council promotes Leonese language courses.

== See also ==
- Kingdom of León
- County of Mansilla
