= Aragonese Way =

Walking route in Municipios del Camino, Spain

The Aragonese Way (Spanish: Camino Aragonés, Basque: Aragoiko bidea) is a walking route of the Way of St. James beginning at the French-Spanish border at the pass of Somport and joining the French Way (or Camino Francés) at Puente la Reina-Gares in Navarre. It is the continuation of the Arles Way which begins in Arles and crosses the Pyrenees into Spain at Somport.

The route covers approximately 170 km (110 mi) and travels through a variety of landscapes, ranging from mountainous to gently rolling and sometimes nearly flat river valleys. For the most part it follows the River Aragon.

== Locations found along the Aragonese Way ==
- Somport
- Canfranc
- Villanúa
- Jaca
- Santa Cruz de la Serós
- Santa Cilia de Jaca
- Puente la Reina de Jaca
- Ruesta
- Undués de Lerda
- Sangüesa/Zangoza
- Monreal/Elo
- Eunate
- Puente la Reina-Gares
