= Torres Del Río =

Torres del Río
- Municipality
- Coat of arms
- Interactive map of Torres del Río
- Coordinates: 42.553°N 2.269°W
- Country: Spain
- Autonomous Community: Navarre
- Merindad: Estella

Government
  - Mayor: Juan Luis Pérez Leuza

Area
  - Total: 12.81 km^{2} (4.95 sq mi)
- Elevation: 459 m (1,506 ft)

Population (2025-01-01)
  - Total: 116
  - Density: 9.06/km^{2} (23.5/sq mi)
- Time zone: UTC+1 (CET)
  - Summer (DST): UTC+2 (CEST)
- Postal code: 31229
- Official language(s): Basque, Spanish

Torres del Río is a town and municipality located in the province and autonomous community of Navarre, northern Spain.

This town is located by the Linares River opposite Sansol. It is known for its Templar octagonal Romanesque church, formally related to those of Segovia (la Veracruz) and Eunate. The town was conquered from the Muslim occupation in 914 AD and belonged to the Monastery of Irache for several centuries before the citizens of the town bought the monastery out in the 14th century.) It is along The French Way (Spanish: Camino Francés) of the Camino de Santiago.

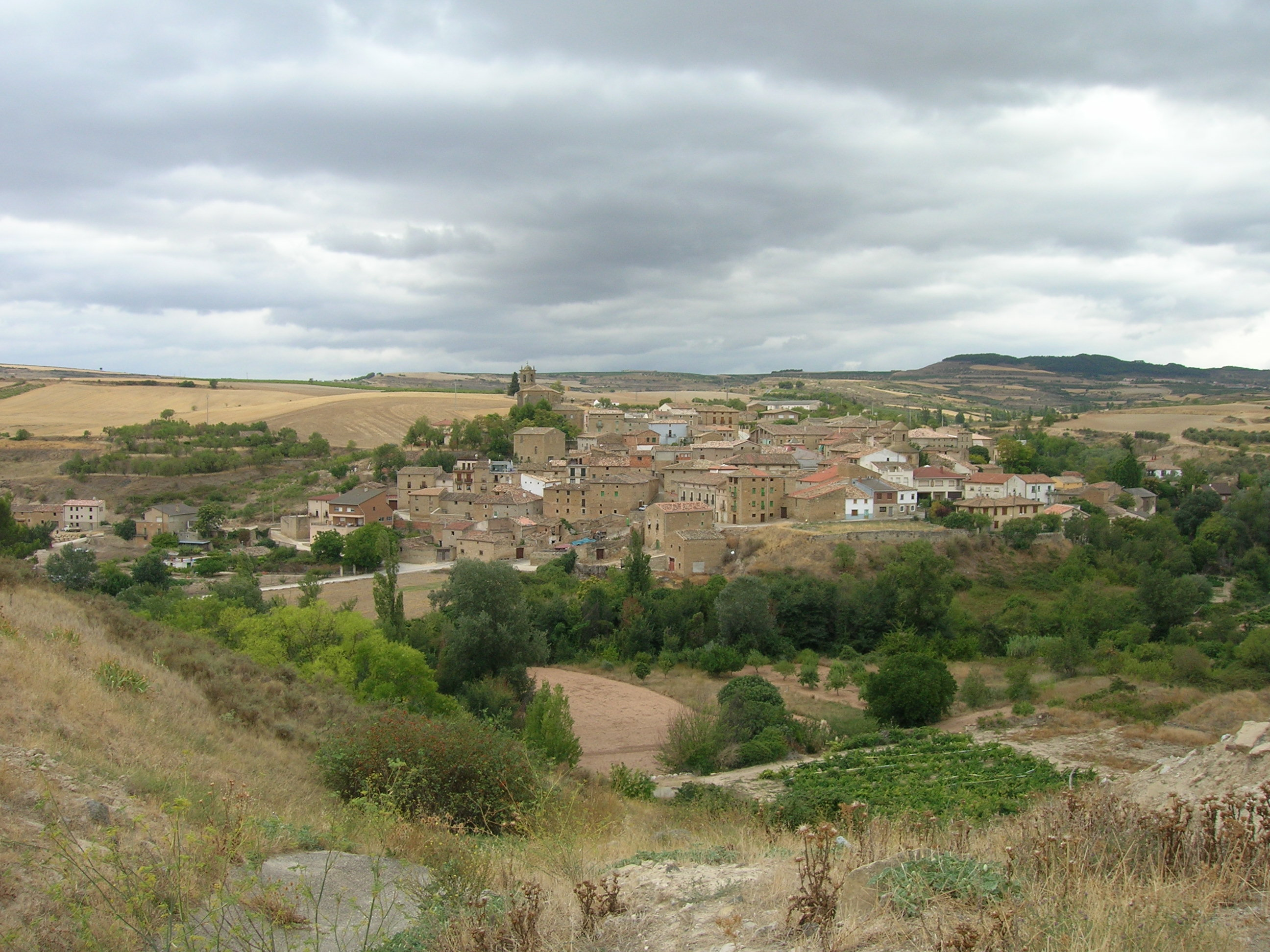
View of Torres del rio
