= Zubiri, Navarre =

- Village
- Zubiri
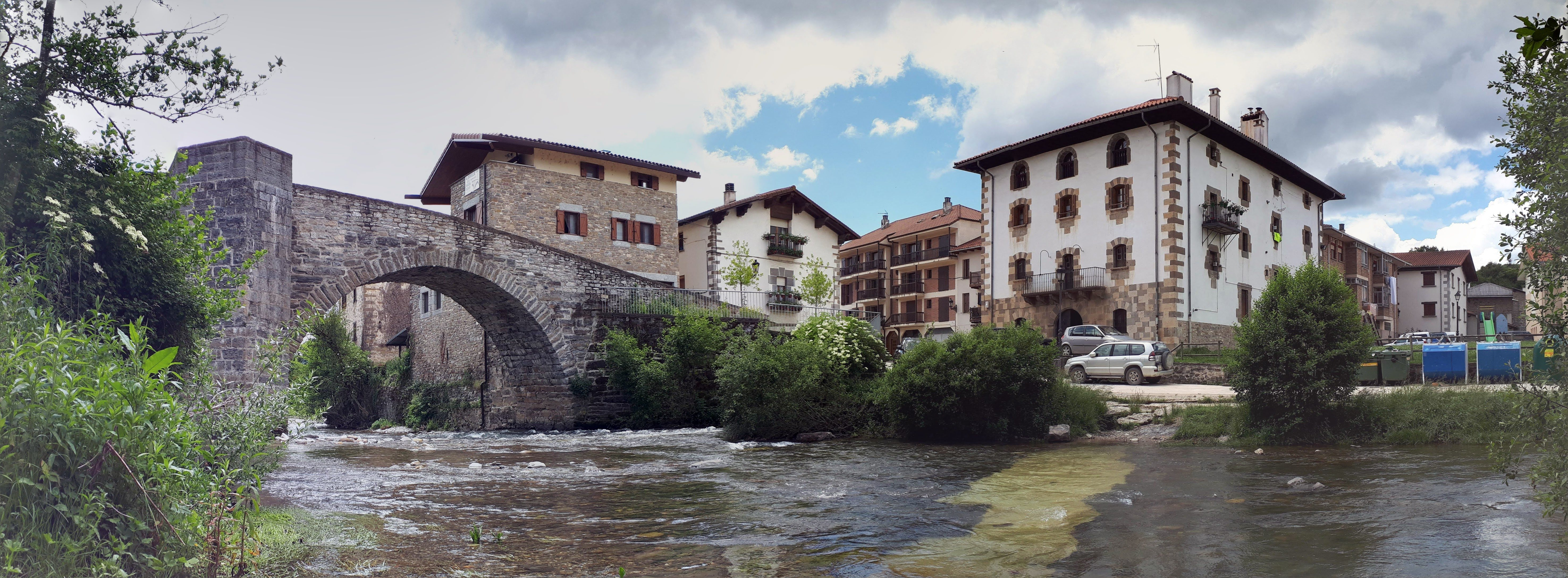

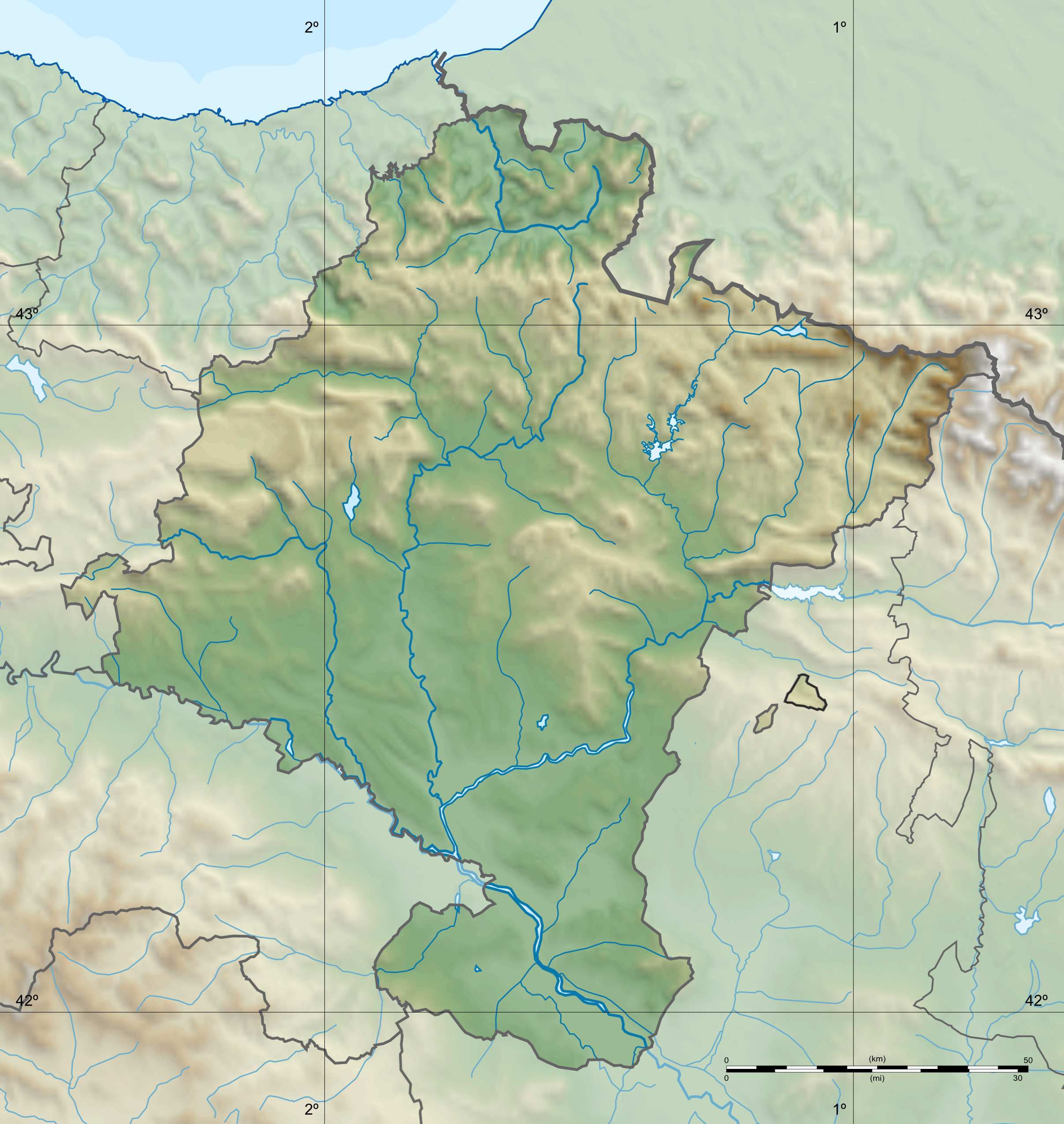
- Location in Navarre, Spain & Europe Zubiri, Navarre (Spain)
- Coordinates: 42.930272°N 1.504309°W
- Country: Spain
- State/Parish: Navarre
- County: N/A
- Elevation: 529 m (1,736 ft)

Population (2017)
  - City: 435
- Time zone: UTC+1 (CET)
  - Summer (DST): UTC+2 (CEST)
- Post code: 31630
- Area code: 307

Zubiri is a small village in Navarre, situated on Spain's N135 with a Romanic bridge across the Arga River. Zubiri is located on the French Way path of the Camino de Santiago. It is the administrative centre of Esteribar.

== Demographics ==
As with many Navarre towns, Zubiri is a small town. The 2017 census by INE Bureau places the population at 435.

Historical population
Year	Pop.	±%
2017	435	—

== Climate ==
Climate Avg High-Lows and Records 2010-2017

As with the rest of Spain, a humid, warm climate ensues, with temperatures ranging from 6 °C to 28 °C:

== Highways and roads ==
- N135 main highway to Pamplona
- N138 North of Zubiri, to rural Spain
- Calle Rio Arga Road Major Residential Access.
