= Bizkarreta-Gerendiain =

- Village
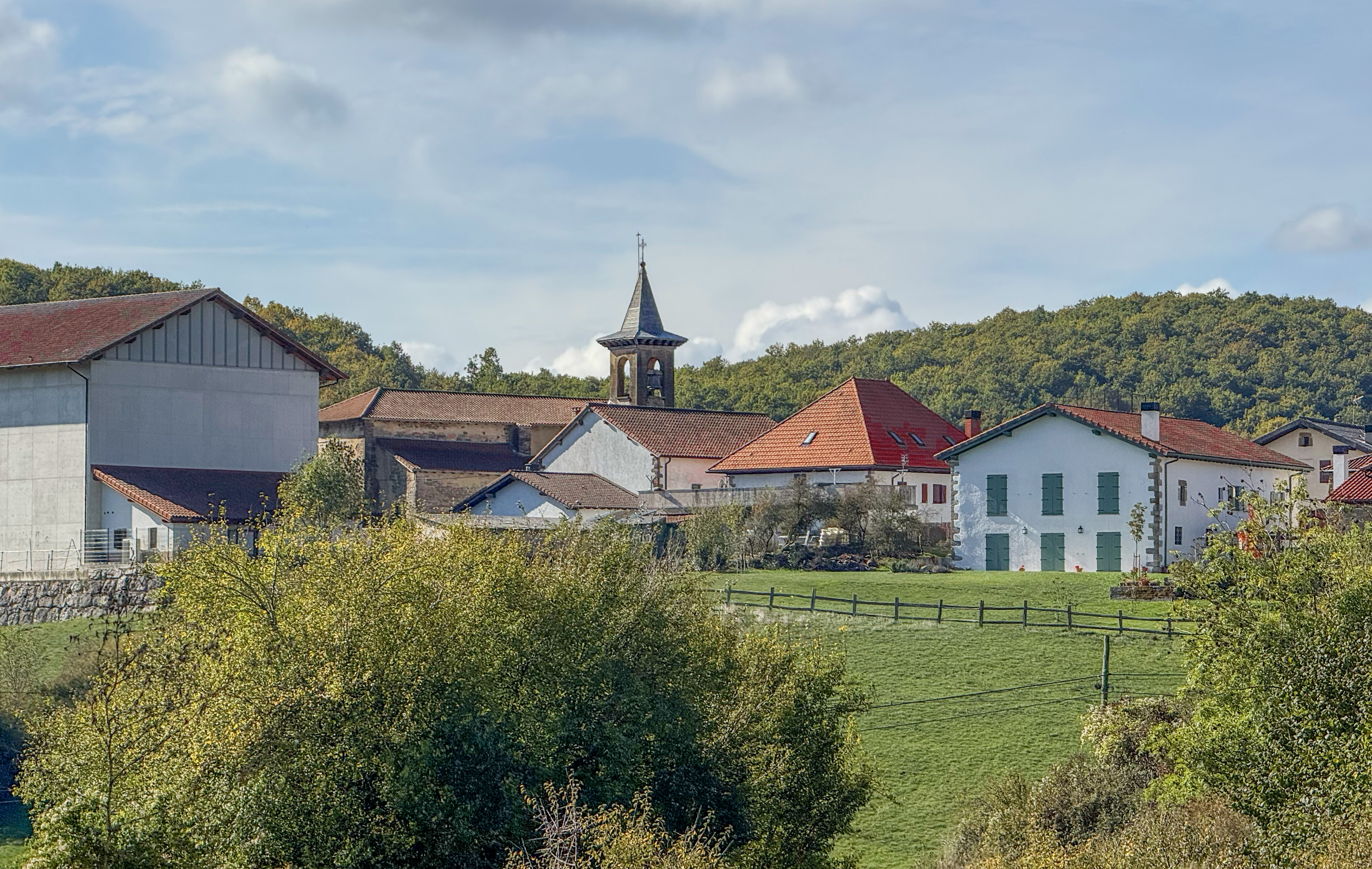
- Bizkarreta-Gerendiain in 2025

- Location within Navarre Location within Spain
- Coordinates: 42°58′04″N 1°25′03″W
- Country: Spain
- Province: Navarre
- Municipality: Erro

Population (2014)
  - Total: 100
- Time zone: UTC+1 (CET)
  - Summer (DST): UTC+2 (CEST)

Bizkarreta-Gerendiain (Spanish: Viscarret-Guerendiáin) is a village located in the Erro municipality of Navarre. The French Way of the Camino de Santiago passes through the town.
