= Monreal, Navarre =

Municipality of Spain

Coordinates: 42°42′N 1°30′W

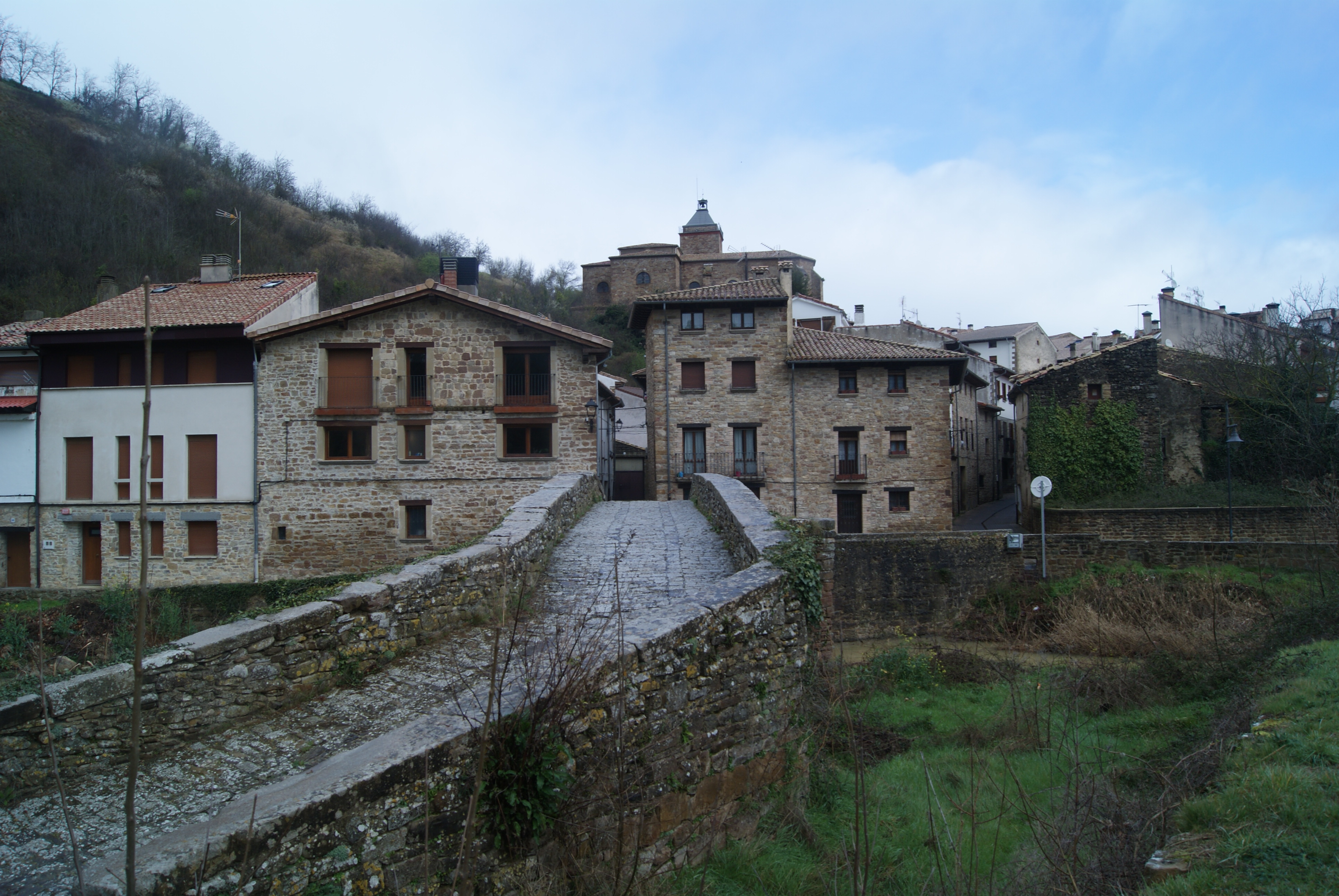
View of Monreal town (Navarra)

Monreal (Basque: Elo) is a town and municipality located in the province and autonomous community of Navarre, northern Spain. It had a population of 295 in 2002. It lies on the old Aragonese pilgrim's road to Santiago de Compostela, a tributary path of the Way of St James.

== History ==
In 1185 Berengaria of Navarre was given the fief of Monreal by her father Sancho VI of Navarre, possibly to enhance her status in view of her betrothal to Richard I of England.

== Geography ==
La Higa sits to the west.

== Demography ==
From:INE Archiv
