= Molinaseca =

- Municipality
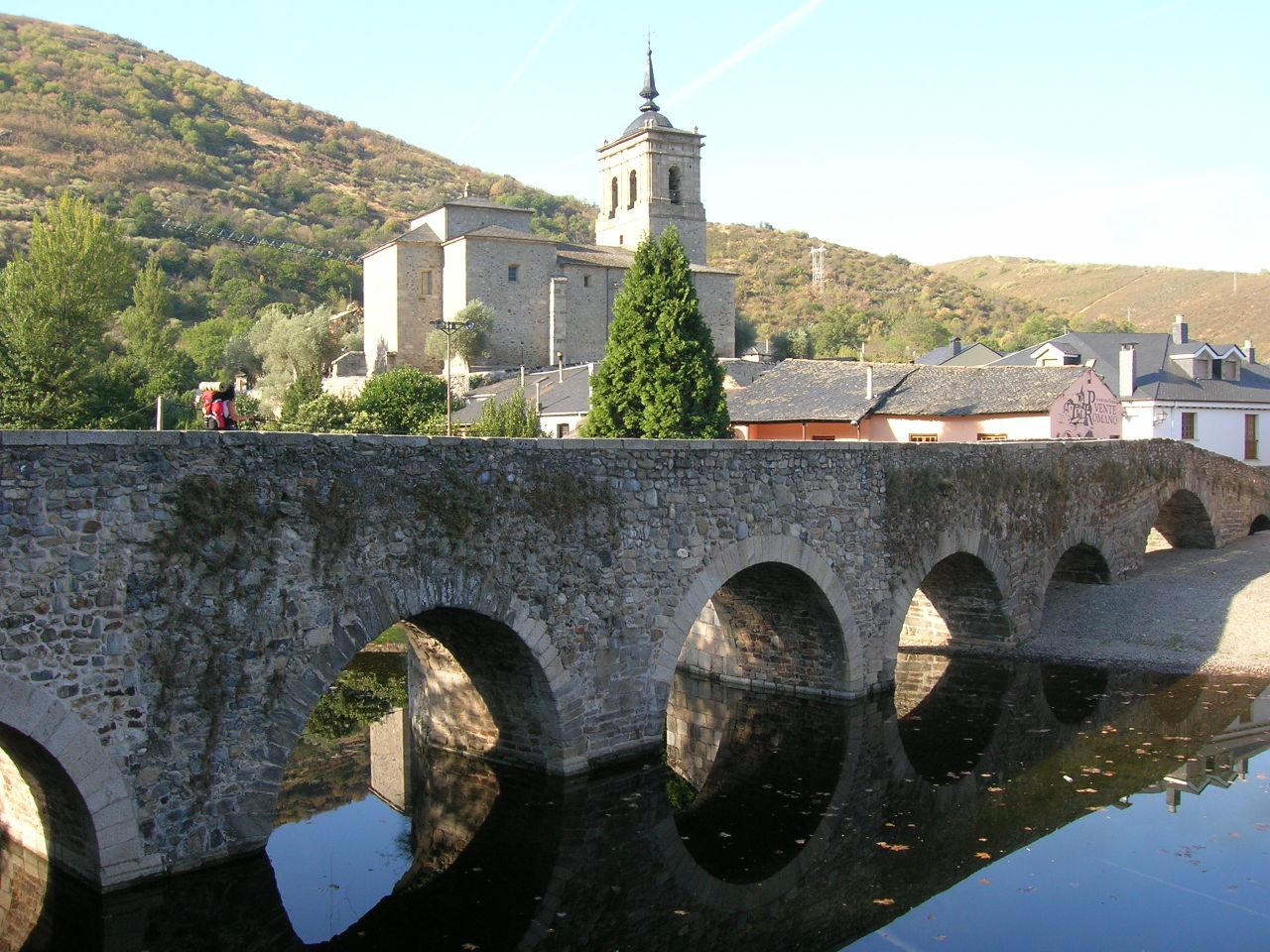
- Bridge over the Meruelo river, created in times of the Ancient Rome

- Coat of arms

- Location of Molinaseca in Spain
- Coordinates: 42°32′17″N 6°31′11″W
- Country: Spain
- Autonomous community: Castile and León
- Province: Province of León
- Region: El Bierzo
- Municipality: Molinaseca

Government
  - Alcalde: Alfonso Arias Balboa (PP)

Area
  - Total: 79.63 km^{2} (30.75 sq mi)
- Elevation: 580 m (1,900 ft)

Population (2025-01-01)
  - Total: 870
  - Density: 11/km^{2} (28/sq mi)
- Time zone: UTC+1 (CET)
  - Summer (DST): UTC+2 (CEST)
- Postal codes: 24398 and 24413
- Area code: 987
- Climate: Csb
- Website: www.molinaseca.org

Molinaseca is a village and municipality located in the region of El Bierzo (province of León, Castile and León, Spain) . According to the 2010 census (INE), the municipality has a population of 818 inhabitants. It is located on the French Way, the most popular path of the Camino de Santiago.

Its name originates from the old mills on the Meruelo River that supported the town’s economy during the Middle Ages.

== Sister cities ==
- Ainan, Japan
- Águas de São Pedro, Brazil
