= Sansol =

- Municipality
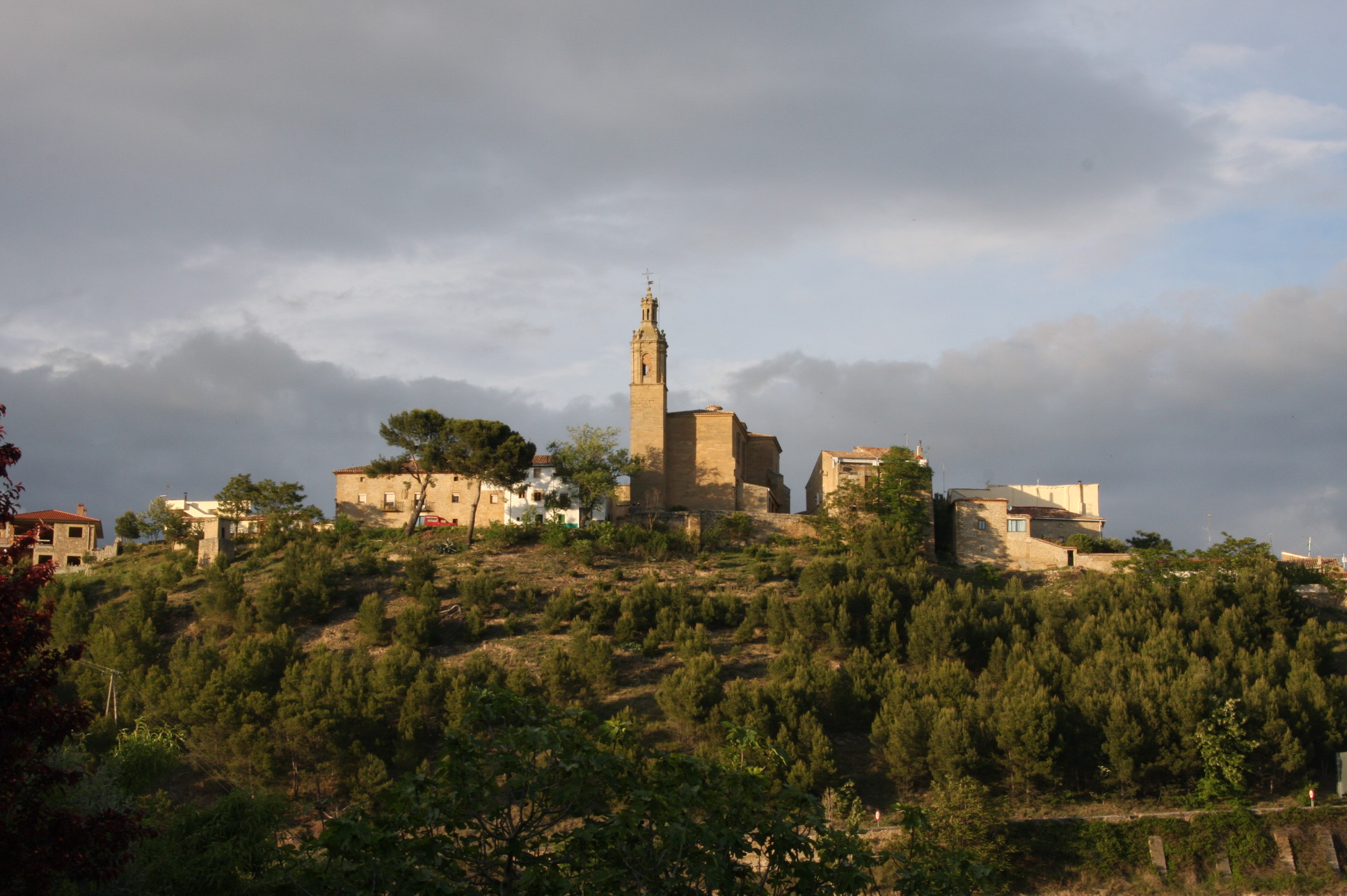
- View of Sansol

- Coat of arms

- Location of Sansol within Navarre Location of Sansol within Spain
- Coordinates: 42°33′N 2°16′W
- Country: Spain
- Autonomous Community: Navarre
- Merindad: Estella

Government
  - Mayor: Francisco Javier Díaz de Ilarraza Sanz

Area
  - Total: 13.31 km^{2} (5.14 sq mi)
- Elevation: 485 m (1,591 ft)

Population (2025-01-01)
  - Total: 89
  - Density: 6.7/km^{2} (17/sq mi)
- Demonym(s): Sansolano, Sansolana
- Time zone: UTC+1 (CET)
  - Summer (DST): UTC+2 (CEST)
- Postal code: 31220
- Official language(s): Basque, Spanish

Sansol (Basque: Santsol) is a town and municipality located in the province and autonomous community of Navarre, northern Spain. It is located opposite Torres del Río, on a hill on the other side of the Linares River.
