= Población de Campos =

Coordinates: 42°16′N 4°27′W

- municipality
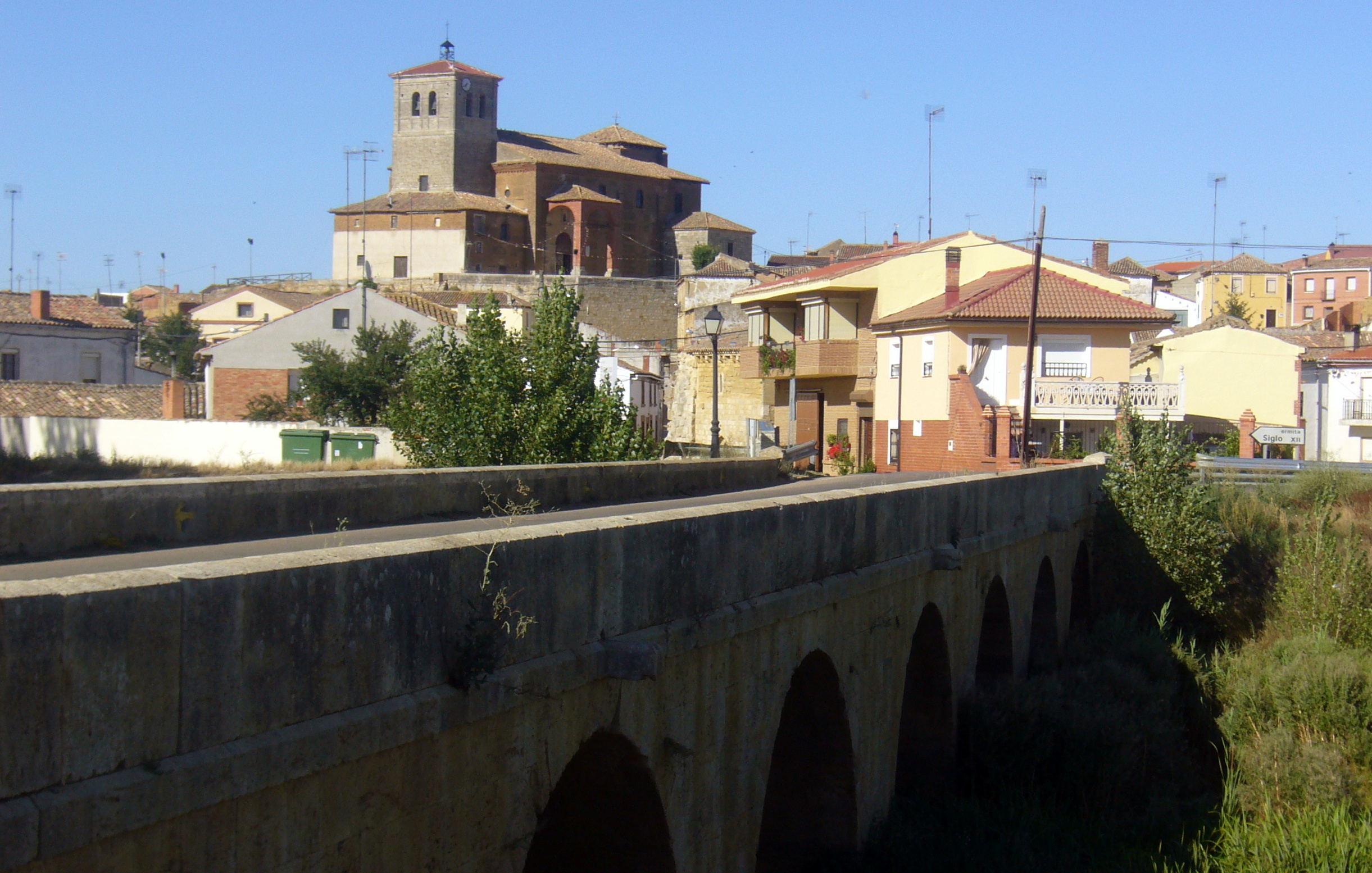

- Coat of arms
- Interactive map of Población de Campos
- Country: Spain
- Autonomous community: Castile and León
- Province: Palencia
- Municipality: Población de Campos

Area
  - Total: 23 km^{2} (8.9 sq mi)

Population (2025-01-01)
  - Total: 119
  - Density: 5.2/km^{2} (13/sq mi)
- Time zone: UTC+1 (CET)
  - Summer (DST): UTC+2 (CEST)
- Website: Official website

Población de Campos is a municipality in the province of Palencia, Castile and León, Spain. According to the 2004 census (INE), the municipality has a population of 179 inhabitants.

== History ==
Since the mid-12th century, Poblacion de Campos was lordship by the Order of St. John of Jerusalem or Knights of Rhodes and Malta. The historical evidence indicates that Alfonso VII granted this privilege to this Order in Salamanca on June 24 of the year 1140. The lordship and jurisdiction of the cross was established shortly after.

Poblacion de Campos likely originated in the 9th century, but likely it was preceded by a Roman villa settlement as suggested by the Loncejares excavations. Its geographical location in a high and the name of "Castle" to one of its neighborhoods suggest that Poblacion de Campos had in the past walls and likely a castle. Since the 10th century Poblacion de Campos is part of the Christian pilgrim way "Camino de Santiago", the Way of St. James, to Santiago as attested by its French street.

At the time of apogee of the "Camino de Santiago", Poblacion de Campos had two renowned hospitals, Our Lady of Mercy and the San Miguel Hospital.

At the end of the 16th century, Poblacion's population had 154 neighbors, which felt to 106 in 1751 while in 1900, 1930 and 1960 had 861, 735, and 500, respectively. The population living in this village in 2009 is under 200, at the levels of the 16th century.
