= Villadangos del Páramo =

Coordinates: 42°31′N 5°46′W

Villadangos del Páramo, Spain
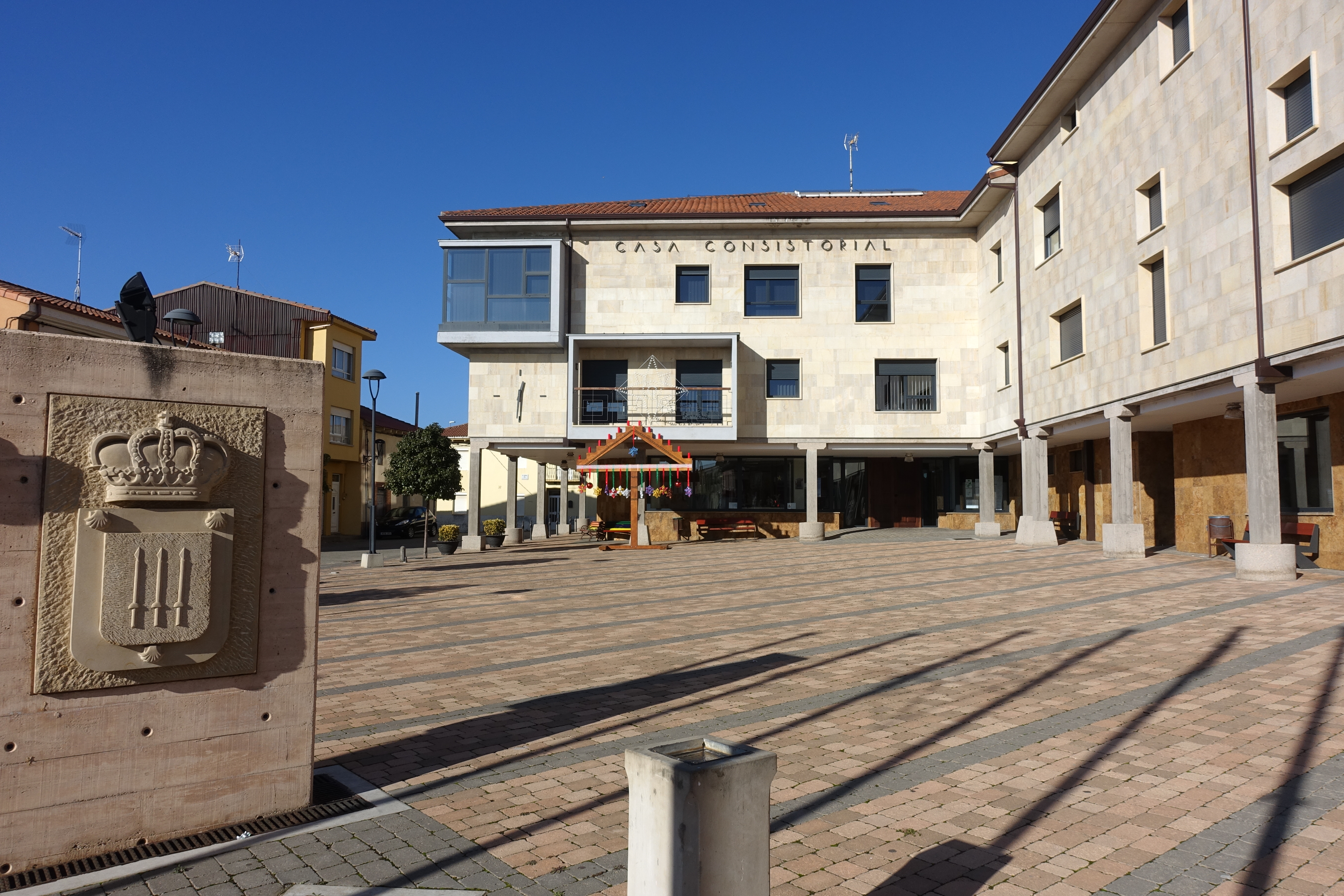
- Villadangos del Páramo Town Hall

- Flag Coat of arms
- Interactive map of Villadangos del Páramo, Spain
- Country: Spain
- Autonomous community: Castile and León
- Province: León
- Municipality: Villadangos del Páramo

Area
  - Total: 45 km^{2} (17 sq mi)

Population (2025-01-01)
  - Total: 1,268
  - Density: 28/km^{2} (73/sq mi)
- Time zone: UTC+1 (CET)
  - Summer (DST): UTC+2 (CEST)

Villadangos del Páramo (Spanish pronunciation: [biʎaˈðaŋɡos ðel ˈpaɾamo]) is a municipality located in the province of León, Castile and León, Spain. According to the 2004 census (INE), the municipality has a population of 1,018 inhabitants.
