= Acebo (river) =

River in Spain

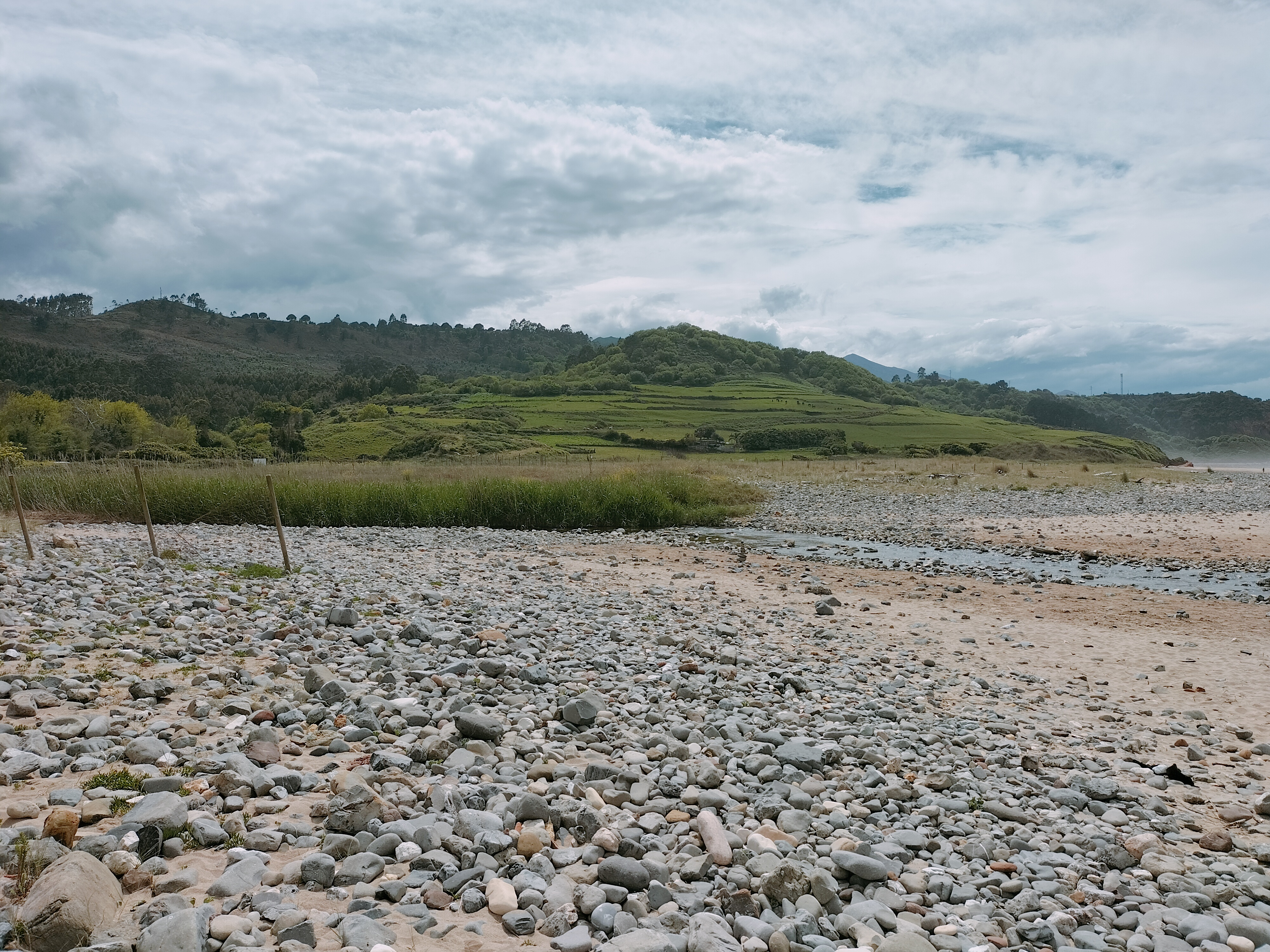

Location
- Country: Spain
- State: Asturias
- Region: Parres; Ribadesella

Physical characteristics
- Source
  - coordinates: 43°25′2″N 5°10′2″W
  - elevation: 359 m (1,178 ft)
- Mouth
  - location: Bay of Biscay
  - coordinates: 43°28′51″N 5°8′8″W
  - elevation: 0 m (0 ft)
- Length: 5 km (3.1 mi)

The Acebo (Asturian: Xardón) is a river in northern Spain flowing through the Autonomous Community of Asturias.
