= Funes, Navarra =

Funes
- Municipality
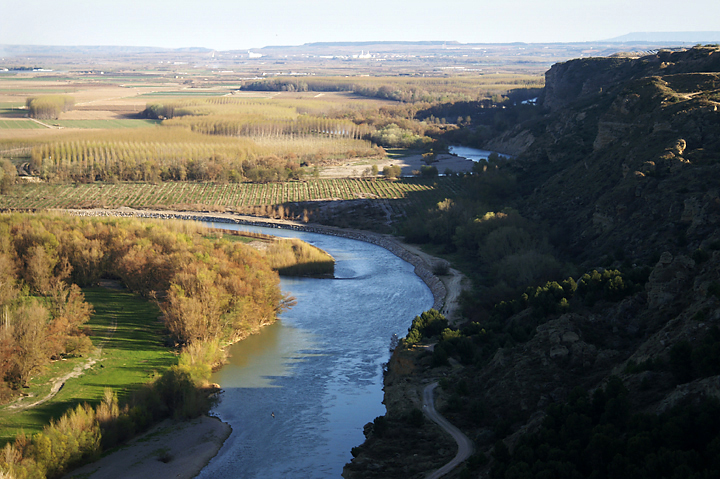

- Flag Coat of arms

- Location in Spain
- Coordinates: 42°18′N 1°48′W
- Country: Spain
- Autonomous community: Navarre
- Province: Navarre
- Comarca: Ribera Arga-Aragón

Government
  - Mayor: Ignacio Domínguez
- Elevation: 316 m (1,037 ft)

Population (2025-01-01)
  - Total: 2,537
- Time zone: UTC+1 (CET)
  - Summer (DST): UTC+2 (CEST)
- Postal code: 31650
- Website: Official website

Funes is a town and municipality located in the province and autonomous community of Navarre, northern Spain. It is situated 62 kilometers from the capital of the community, Pamplona. Its population in 2017 was 2,482 inhabitants.

Historically, there was a Jewish community in Funes, who were initially given protection by King Sancho VI of Navarre, and who experienced little recorded antisemitism.
