= El Acebo =

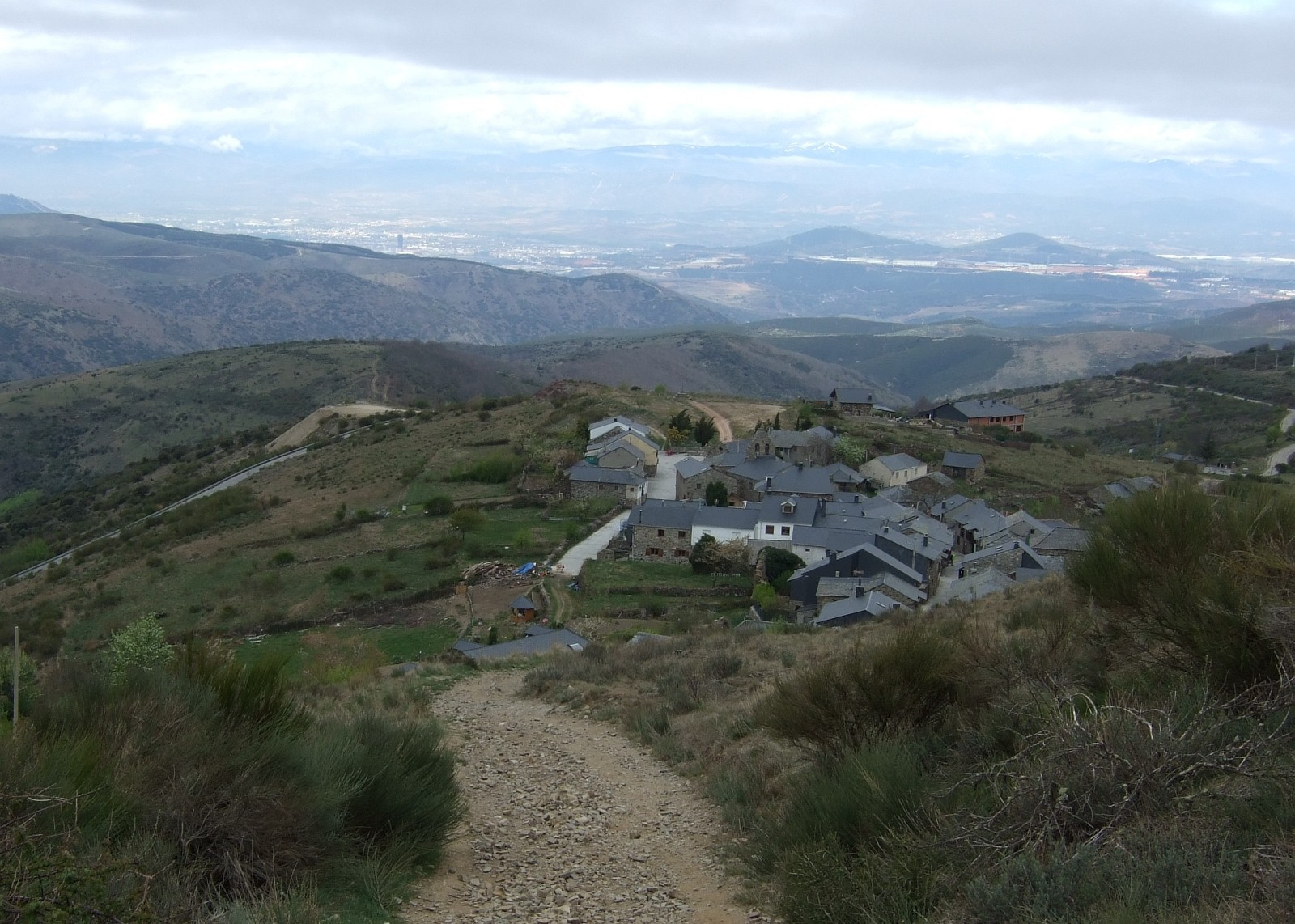
- El Acebo from the Ponferrada

- Location in Spain El Acebo (Spain)
- Coordinates: 42°30′N 6°27′W
- Country: Spain
- Autonomous community: Castile and León
- Province: León
- Comarca: El Bierzo
- Elevation: 1,150 m (3,770 ft)

Population (2011)
  - Total: 37
- Time zone: UTC+1 (CET)
  - Summer (DST): UTC+2 (CET)

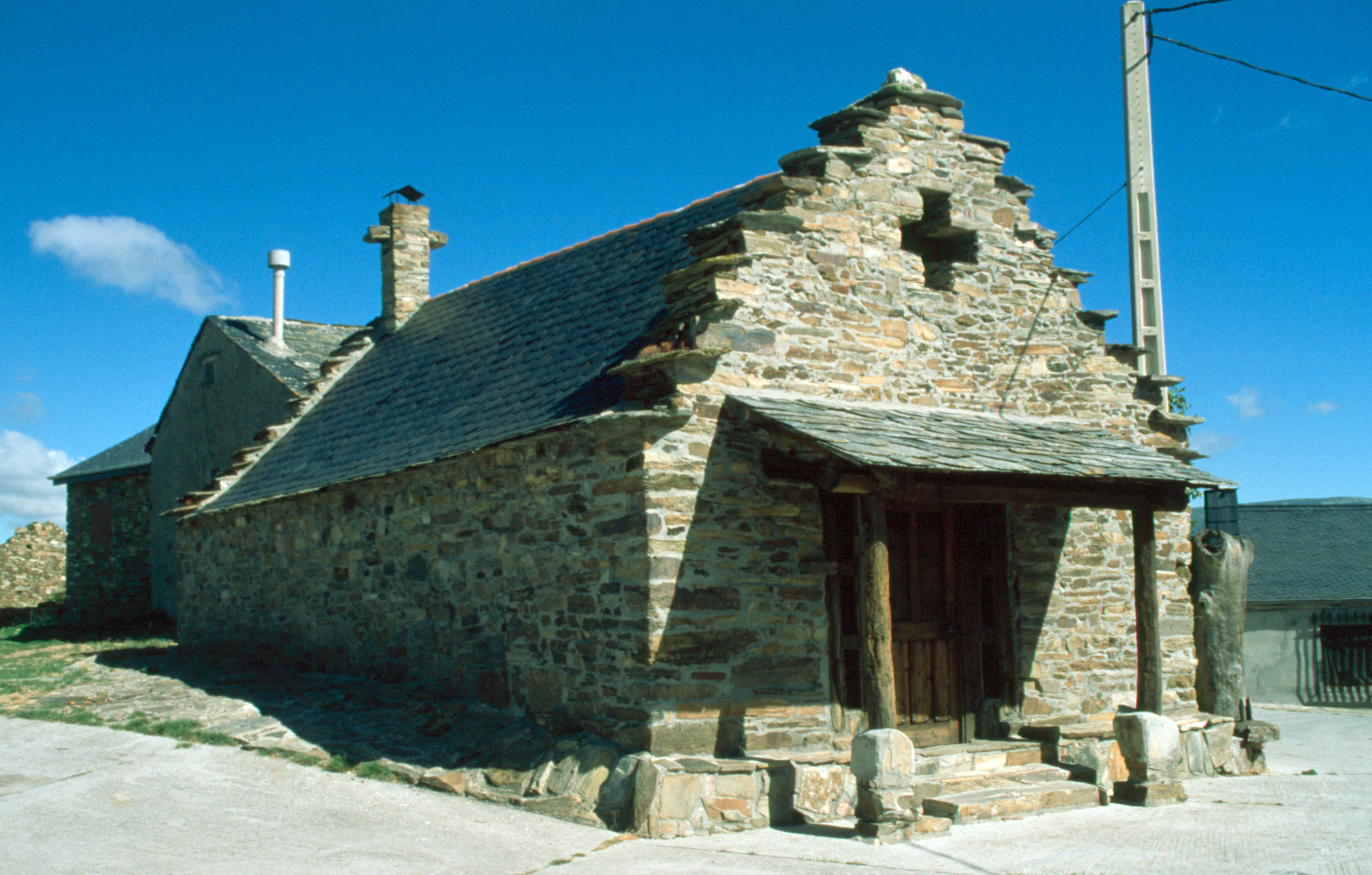
El Acebo

El Acebo is a very small village on the Camino de Santiago in the Province of León in the Autonomous community of Castille-León. The village is named after the European Holly.

The village is typical of mountain villages of upper Bierzo, with houses built from and covered in slate (the typical building material of the region). Another characteristic of the homes are the street-facing wooden balconies, that sometimes reach outside of an outdoor staircase.

According to oral tradition the residents in the Middle Ages were against installation and maintenance of 800 stakes to mark the pilgrimage route (which is especially important in this area due to snow), which came as tribute from the king.

Like in other villages along the Camino de Santiago, the revival of the Camino de Santiago improved the economic basis of the villages: Next to communal and private hostels there are holiday houses known as Casas Rurales, as well as a grocery that had reopened. These is also a restaurant.

The village church is devoted to the archangel Michael and houses a polychrome figure, that represents Santiago.

At the village exit there is a modern monument made out of rebar to the death of the German cycling pilgrim Heinrich Krause, who died here on 13 August 1987.

As a result, cyclists are now warned about the winding and steep descent towards Molinaseca.

After the monument the street swings towards Compludo. St. Fructuosus indicates the founding of its first monastery in the 7th century and it has consecrated the Saints Justo and Pasor. One can also see the Medieval blacksmith of Compludo from the view of the monastery. A legend states that a sword was forged here, that Pelagius of Asturias had used in the Battle of Covadonga.
