= Itero de la Vega =

Coordinates: 42°17′N 4°15′W

- municipality
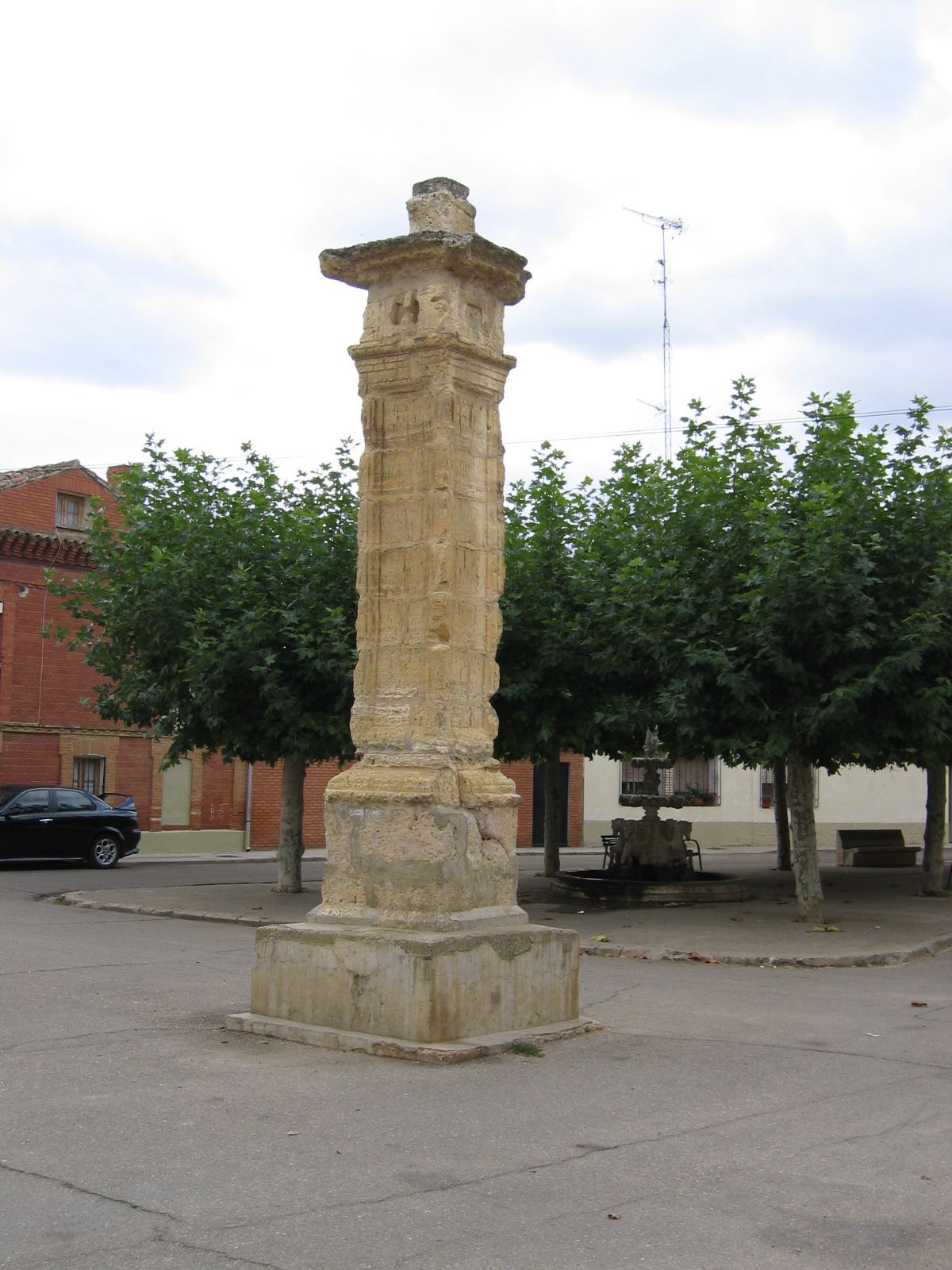

- Coat of arms
- Interactive map of Itero de la Vega
- Country: Spain
- Autonomous community: Castile and León
- Province: Palencia
- Municipality: Itero de la Vega

Area
  - Total: 20 km^{2} (7.7 sq mi)

Population (2025-01-01)
  - Total: 147
  - Density: 7.3/km^{2} (19/sq mi)
- Time zone: UTC+1 (CET)
  - Summer (DST): UTC+2 (CEST)
- Website: Official website

Itero de la Vega is a municipality located in the province of Palencia, Castile and León, Spain. According to the 2004 census (INE), the municipality has a population of 215 inhabitants.
