= Ledigos =

Municipality in Castile and León, Spain

Coordinates: 42°21′N 4°52′W

- municipality
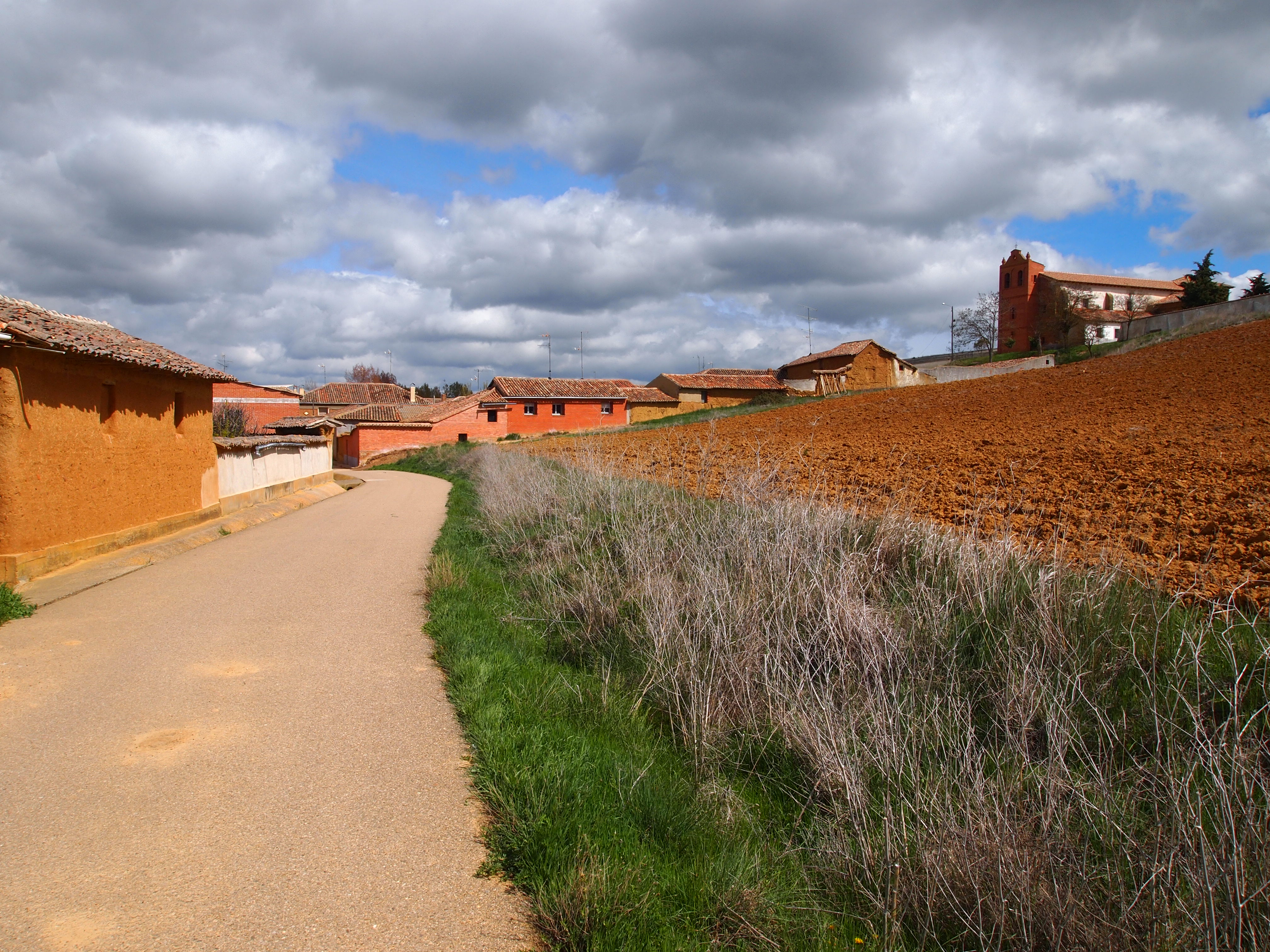
- Interactive map of Ledigos
- Country: Spain
- Autonomous community: Castile and León
- Province: Palencia
- Municipality: Ledigos

Area
  - Total: 28 km^{2} (11 sq mi)

Population (2025-01-01)
  - Total: 59
  - Density: 2.1/km^{2} (5.5/sq mi)
- Time zone: UTC+1 (CET)
  - Summer (DST): UTC+2 (CEST)
- Website: Official website

Ledigos is a municipality located in the province of Palencia, Castile and León, Spain. According to the 2021 census (INE), the municipality has a population of 66 inhabitants.

== Ledigos in the movies ==
- 2005 : Saint-Jacques ... La Mecque directed by Coline Serreau
