= Roncesvalles =

Roncesvalles Orreaga (Basque)
- Municipality
- Orreaga / Roncesvalles
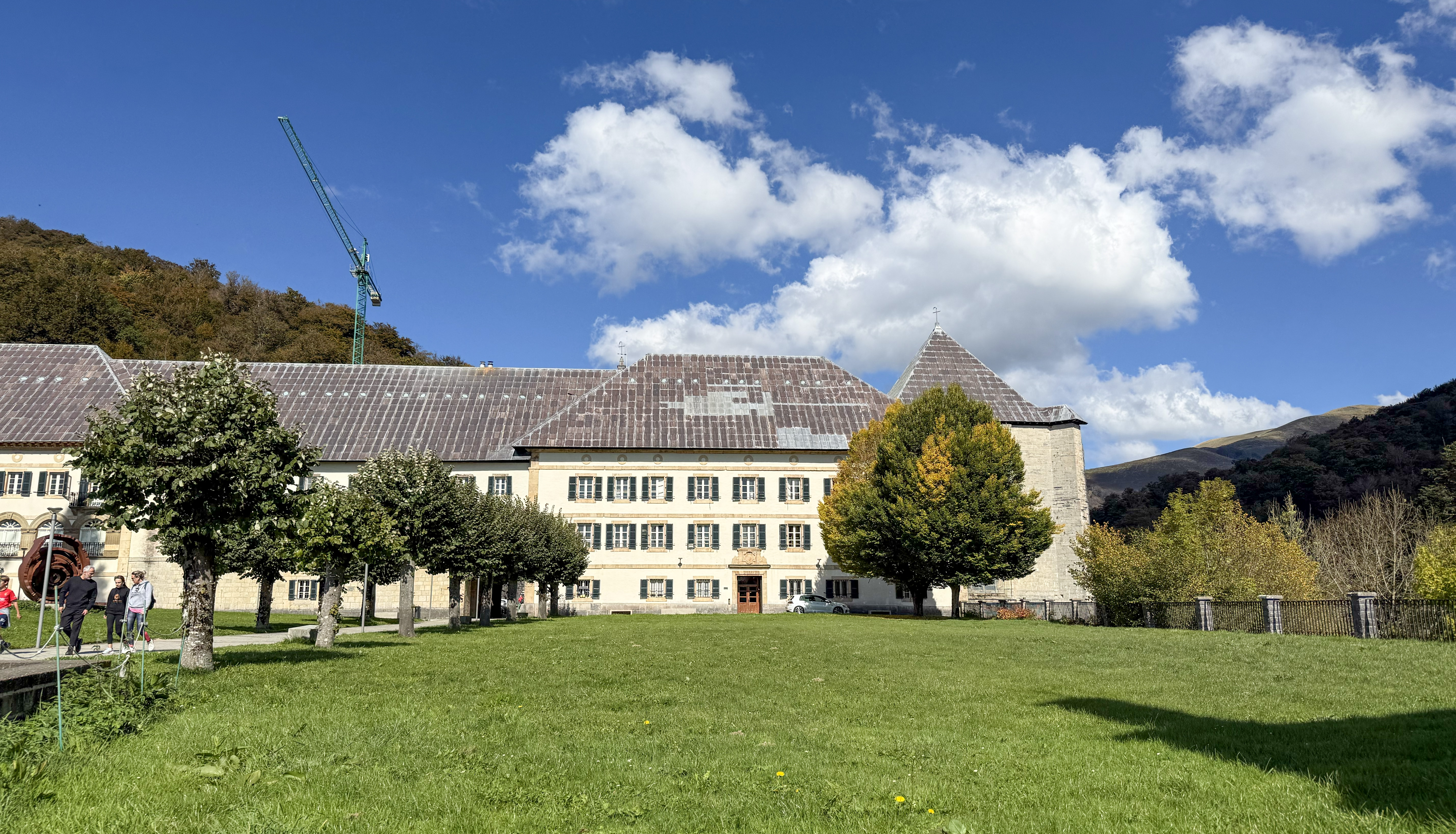
- Roncesvalles in 2025

- Flag Coat of arms

- Location in Spain
- Coordinates: 43°0′N 1°19′W
- Country: Spain
- Autonomous community: Navarre
- Province: Navarre
- Comarca / Eskualdea: Auñamendi
- Judicial district: Agoitz / Aóiz

Government
  - Mayor: Luis Echeverría Echávarren

Area
  - Total: 15.1 km^{2} (5.8 sq mi)
- Elevation: 923 m (3,028 ft)
- Highest elevation: 1,564 m (5,131 ft)
- Lowest elevation: 910 m (2,990 ft)

Population (2025-01-01)
  - Total: 25
  - Density: 1.7/km^{2} (4.3/sq mi)
- Demonym: Orreagatar
- Time zone: UTC+1 (CET)
  - Summer (DST): UTC+2 (CEST)
- Postal code: 31650
- Dialing code: 948
- Website: Official website

Roncesvalles (/ˈrɒnsəvælz/ RON-sə-valz, Spanish: [ronθesˈbaʎes]; Basque: Orreaga [oreaɣa]; Aragonese: Ronzesbals [ɾonθezˈbals]; Occitan: Ronçasvals; French: Roncevaux [ʁɔ̃s(ə)vo]) is a small village and municipality in Navarre, northern Spain. It is situated on the small river Urrobi at an altitude of some 900 metres (3,000 ft) in the Pyrenees, about 4 kilometres (2.5 mi) from the French border as the crow flies, or 21 kilometres (13 mi) by road.

== History ==
=== Battle of Roncevaux ===
Roncesvalles is famous in history and legend for the death of Roland in 778, during the Battle of Roncevaux Pass, when Charlemagne's rearguard was destroyed by Basque tribes.

When a party of horsemen from the Kingdom of Navarre arrived at the Duchy of Burgundy in 1439 to negotiate Prince Charles of Navarre's marriage to Agnes of Cleves, the Duke of Burgundy's niece, the prior of Roncesvalles was their chief ambassador. He was described as a "noble knight".

The small collegiate church contains several curious relics associated with Roland. The battle is said to have been fought in the valley known as Valcarlos, which is now occupied by a hamlet bearing the same name, and in the adjoining pass of Ibañeta (Roncevaux Pass). Both of these are traversed by the main road leading north from Roncesvalles to Saint-Jean-Pied-de-Port, in the French Basque Country.

=== Santa María de Roncesvalles ===
Since the Middle Ages, this collegiate church of Santa María de Orreaga/Roncesvalles has been a favorite resting place for Catholic pilgrims along the French Way path, the most popular variant of the Way of St. James, since it is the first place to have a rest after crossing the French Pyrenees. The church, a former pilgrim's hospice, was built at the end of the twelfth and beginning of the thirteenth centuries. The oldest building is the Chapel of Sancti Spiritus, or "Charlemagne's Silo" built in Romanesque style in the 12th century.

Every year thousands of pilgrims begin their way to Santiago de Compostela at Roncesvalles.

The area was also the site of the 1813 Battle of Roncesvalles during the Peninsular War.

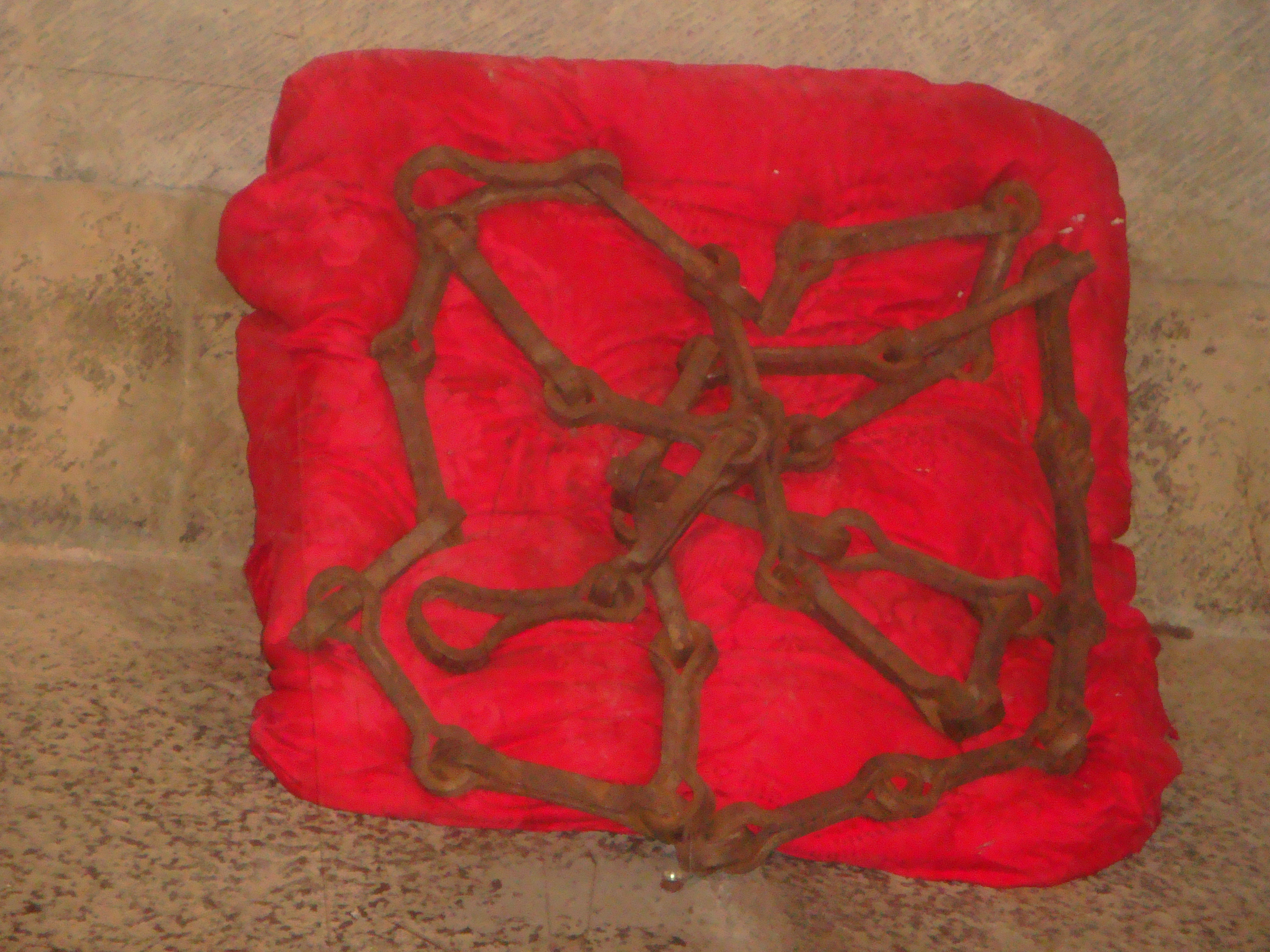
Chains found in a Roncesvalles church, said to have inspired the coat of arms of Navarre. Photographed at the Museum of Roncesvalles.

== See also ==
- Roncevaux Pass
