= Erro, Navarre =

Town in Spain

Coordinates: 42°57′N 1°27′W

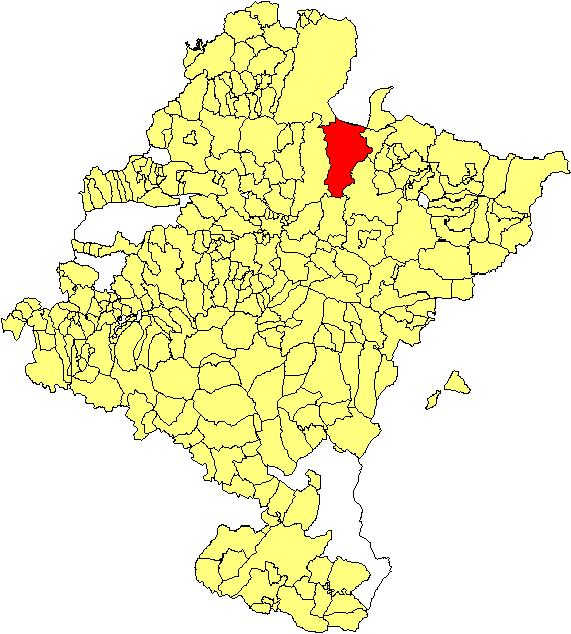
Location of Erro within Navarre

Erro (standard basque: Erroibar; Erro basque: Erroiberra) is a town and municipality located in the province and autonomous community of Navarra, northern Spain.

Its capital is Lintzoain.
