= Belascoáin =

Settlement in Navarre, Spain

Coordinates: 42°45′22″N 1°49′57″W

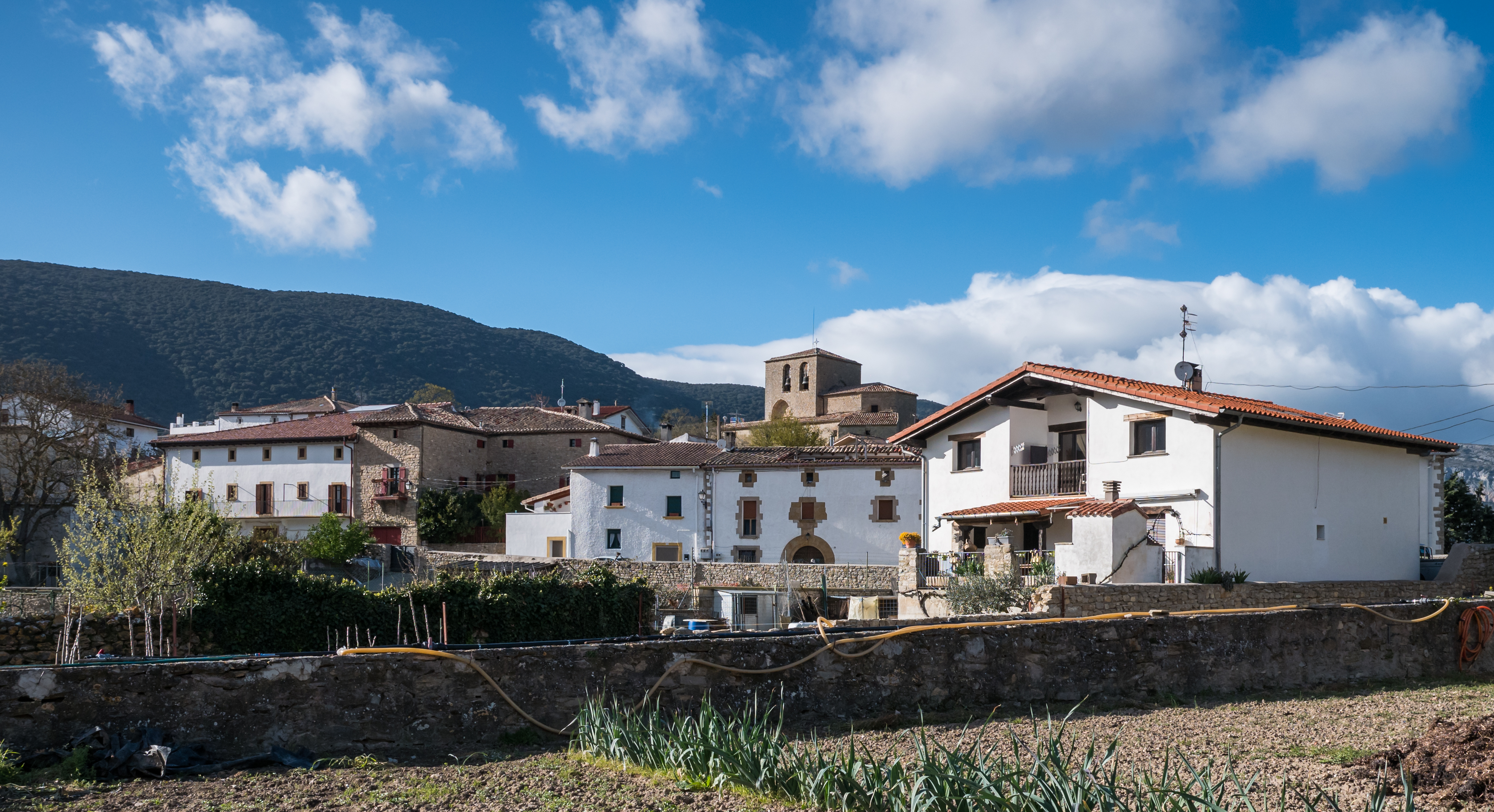
View of Belascoaín

Belascoáin's coat of arms

Belascoain (Basque: Beraskoain) is a town and municipality located in the province and autonomous community of Navarre, northern Spain.
