= Esteribar =

Settlement in Navarre, Spain

Coordinates: 42°57′0″N 1°32′0″W

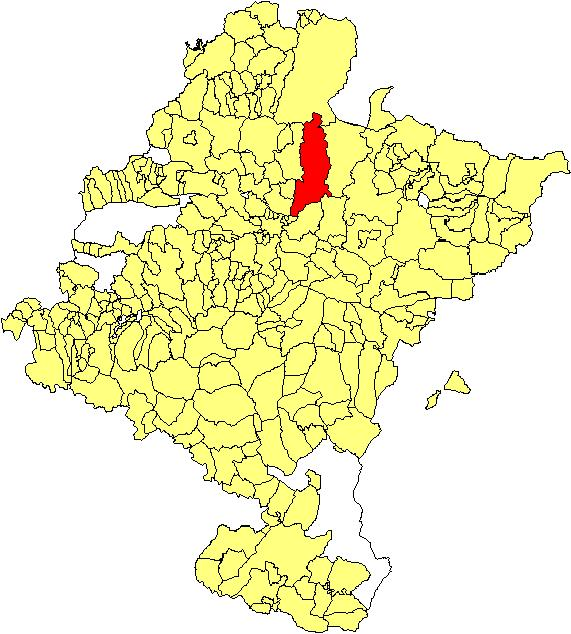

Esteribar is a town and municipality located in the province and autonomous community of Navarre, northern Spain. The municipal administrative centre is in Zubiri.
