= Calzada del Coto =

- Municipality
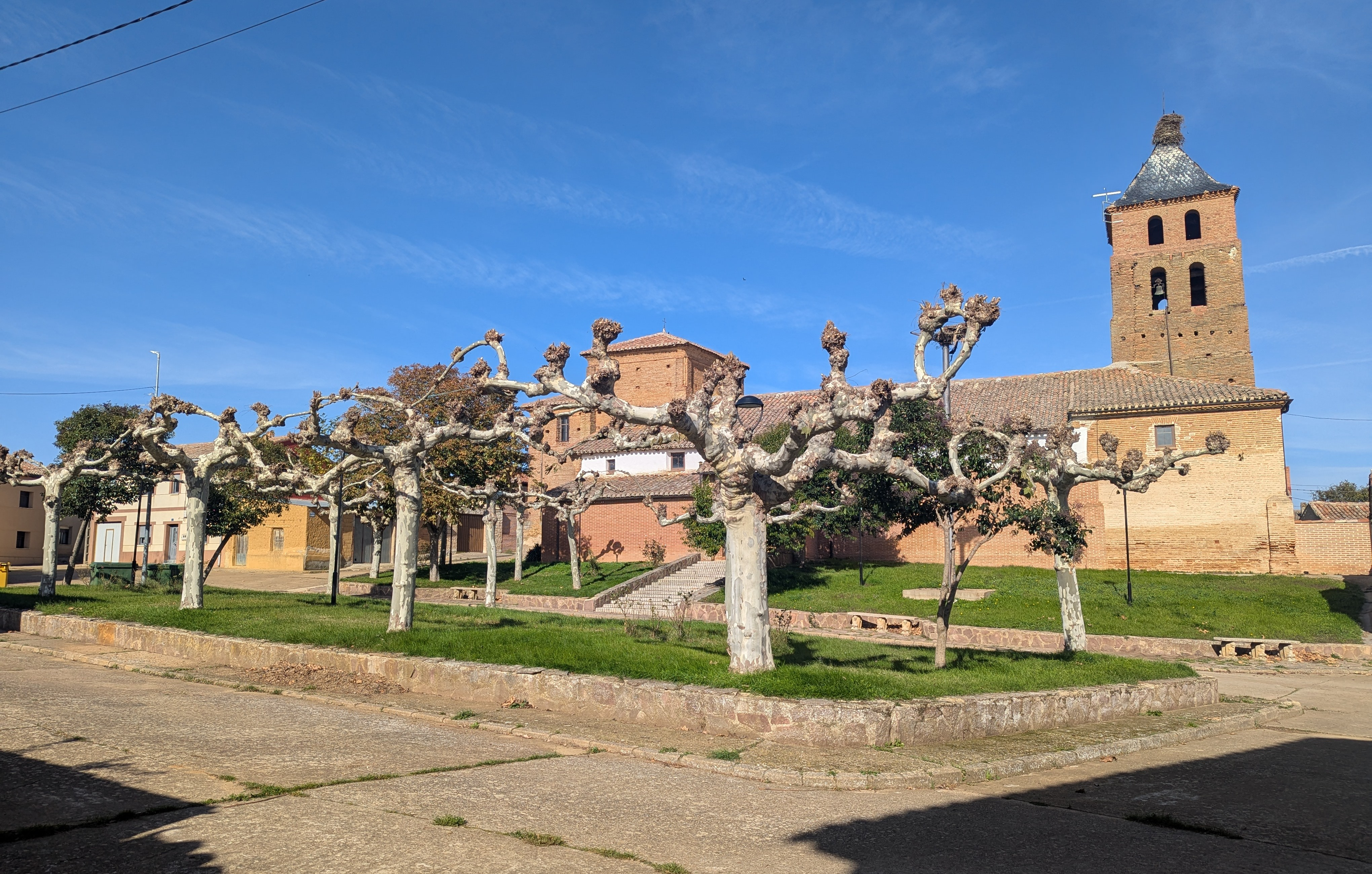
- Church of San Esteban viewed from La Plaza

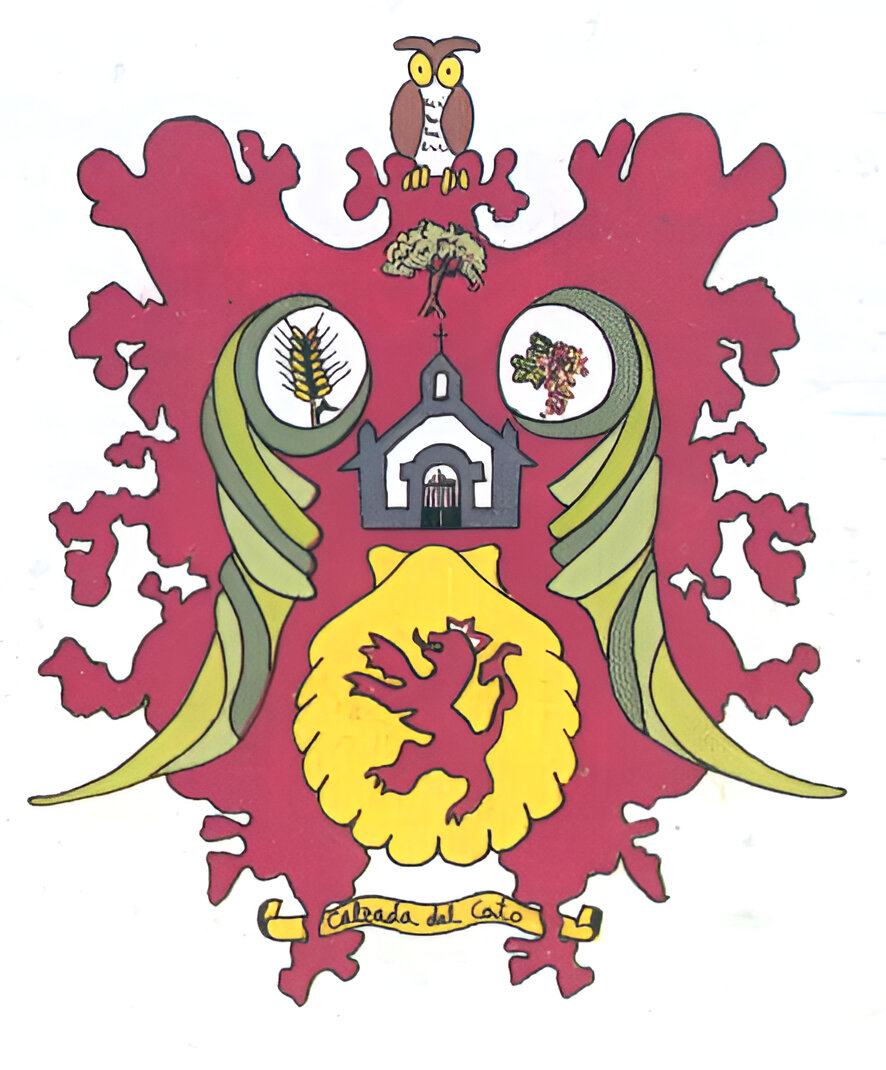
- Coat of arms

- Location within Spain
- Coordinates: 42°23′15″N 5°4′50″W
- Country: Spain
- Autonomous community: Castile and León
- Province: León
- Municipality: Calzada del Coto

Government
  - Mayor: Pablo Carbajal Carbajal (PP)

Area
  - Total: 56.03 km^{2} (21.63 sq mi)
- Elevation: 818 m (2,684 ft)

Population (2025-01-01)
  - Total: 217
  - Density: 3.87/km^{2} (10.0/sq mi)
- Demonym(s): cuqueto, cuqueta
- Time zone: UTC+1 (CET)
  - Summer (DST): UTC+2 (CEST)
- Postal Code: 24342
- Telephone prefix: 987
- Climate: Cfb
- Website: Ayto. de Calzada del Coto

Calzada del Coto (Spanish pronunciation: [kalˈθaða ðel ˈkoto]) is a village and municipality in the southeast of the province of León, in the autonomous community of Castile and León, Spain. It belongs to the comarca of Tierra de Sahagún and the judicial district of Sahagún. According to the 2024 census (INE), it has a population of 223 inhabitants. It covers an area of 56.03 square kilometres (21.63 sq mi).

The municipality of Calzada del Coto is made up of two localities: Calzada del Coto (seat or capital) and Codornillos, along with the depopulated settlements of Valdelaguna, Villarrubia, Parazuelo, Mahudes, and Valdelocajos.

Calzada del Coto lies on the Camino de Santiago, specifically along the French Way. It is located 5.4 kilometres (3.4 mi) after Sahagún, which is traditionally considered the halfway point between Saint-Jean-Pied-de-Port and Santiago de Compostela. After passing through the village, pilgrims can either follow the Camino Real (Royal Road) to Bercianos del Real Camino (6.4 km; 4.0 mi) or continue along the Via Trajana (a Roman road) towards Calzadilla de los Hermanillos (8.1 km; 5.0 mi).

== Toponymy ==
Calzada del Coto derives its name from an original Roman road, with the surname reflecting its connection to the Sahagún Monastery. Initially known as "Villa Zacarías," the name changed to "Villa Calzata" in the 11th century, highlighting the significance of the Roman road as part of the new pilgrimage route. The surname "del Coto" first appeared in 1333, indicating its role as the head of the Coto (estate) of the Sahagún Monastery. The etymology is Latin, with "calzada" coming from Vulgar Latin calciāta meaning "paved road," and "coto" from Latin cautus meaning "protected land." The area features a variety of place names of Roman origin, as well as Celtic pre-Roman names, along with Visigothic, Arabic and Leonese toponyms, reflecting its rich linguistic heritage.

The demonym for residents is "cuqueto, -a" (traditionally "cuquete"), notable for its uniqueness compared to other populations also named Calzada.

== History ==
Calzada del Coto has evidence of human occupation since prehistoric times, as indicated by findings such as Neolithic thunderstones and a Chalcolithic Palmela point, currently housed in the Museum of León. During the pre-Roman period, it was inhabited by Celtic tribes, likely situated near the borders between the Astures and the Vaccaei. During the Roman period, the Trajan Way was constructed, which connected Zaragoza to Astorga and is still preserved in some sections. The proximity to this road facilitated the settlement of Roman colonists, highlighted by the existence of a Roman villa in Valdelaguna during the 2nd century AD. Calzada del Coto was part of several Roman provincial divisions, including Citerior, Tarraconensis, and Gallaecia, and was likely integrated into the Asturicense conventus iuridicus.

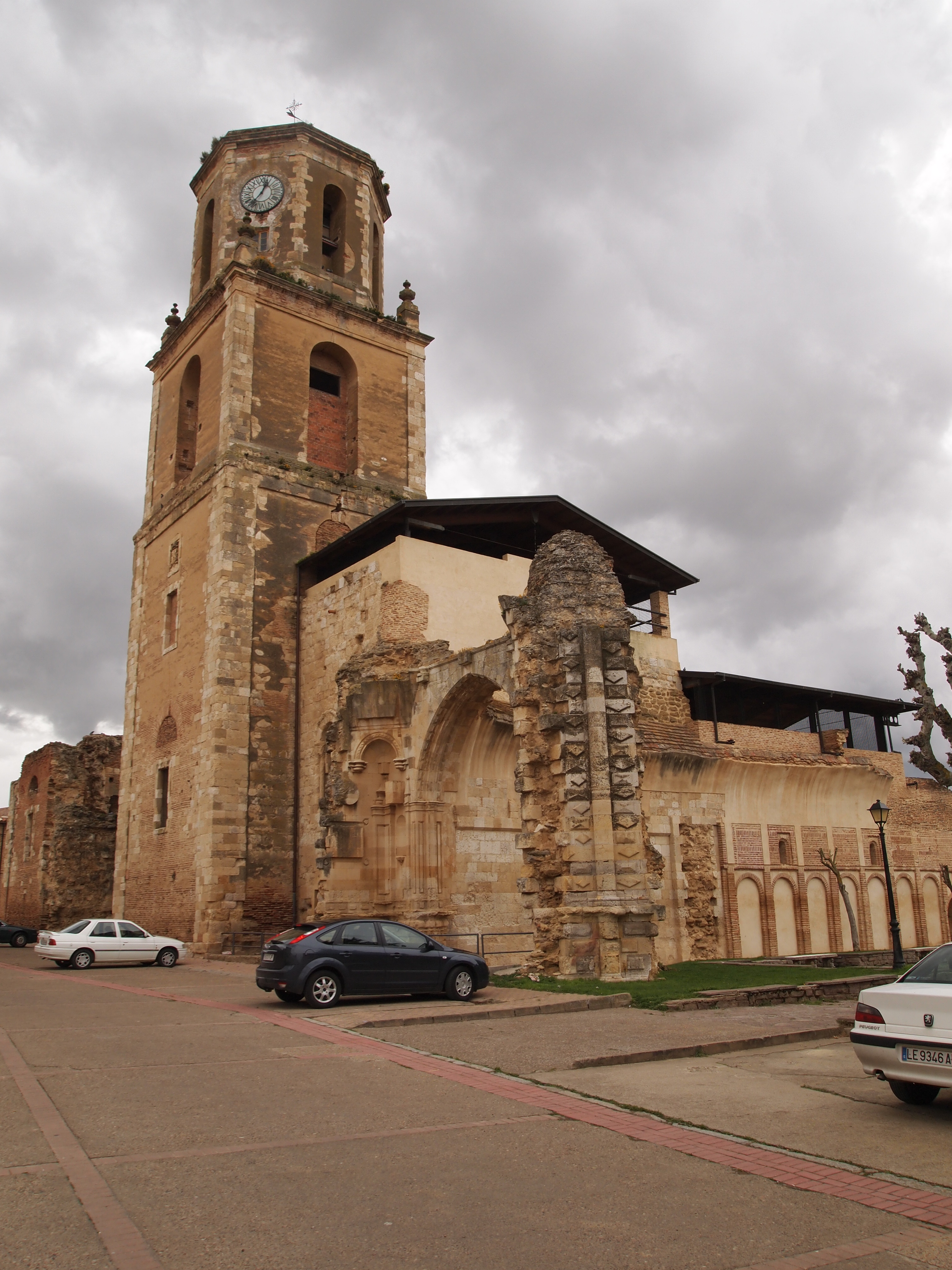
Ruins of Sahagún Monastery

At the fall of the Roman Empire, Calzada del Coto was briefly under the control of the Suebi and later the Visigoth Kingdom until the Arab invasion in the 8th century. The establishment of Christianity in the region likely led to the construction of the original church of San Esteban in the 6th century. The first documentary mention of Calzada del Coto occurred in 880, and in 904, King Alfonso III donated the Villa Zacarías to the Royal Monastery of San Benito, linking Calzada to the monastery until the 19th-century Spanish confiscation. The 11th century was pivotal for Calzada, which became the administrative center of the Coto under Alfonso VI of León, who enhanced the abbot's feudal power. The development of Sahagún before the 1085 fuero and the establishment of the Camino de Santiago changed Calzada.

During the 12th and 13th centuries, Calzada del Coto remained closely connected to the monastery of Sahagún and to the development of the Camino de Santiago. Its position along the pilgrimage route contributed to its importance, while the village remained part of the monastic domain of Sahagún.

During the Early Modern period, Calzada del Coto remained primarily a modest settlement, closely linked to Sahagún and his abbot. In the 19th century, the traditional monastic system was replaced by the modern Spanish administrative structure, and Calzada became an independent municipality after separating from Villamol. The arrival of the railway in 1863 further improved communications with the region, while agriculture continued to form the basis of the local economy.

During the 20th century, Calzada del Coto experienced the demographic decline common to many rural areas of Spain. Agricultural mechanization and migration to larger towns and cities contributed to a substantial reduction in population, particularly from the second half of the century onwards. At the same time, living conditions gradually improved with the introduction of electric lighting and running water, while agricultural modernization and land consolidation transformed the traditional rural landscape and farming practices.

== Geography ==
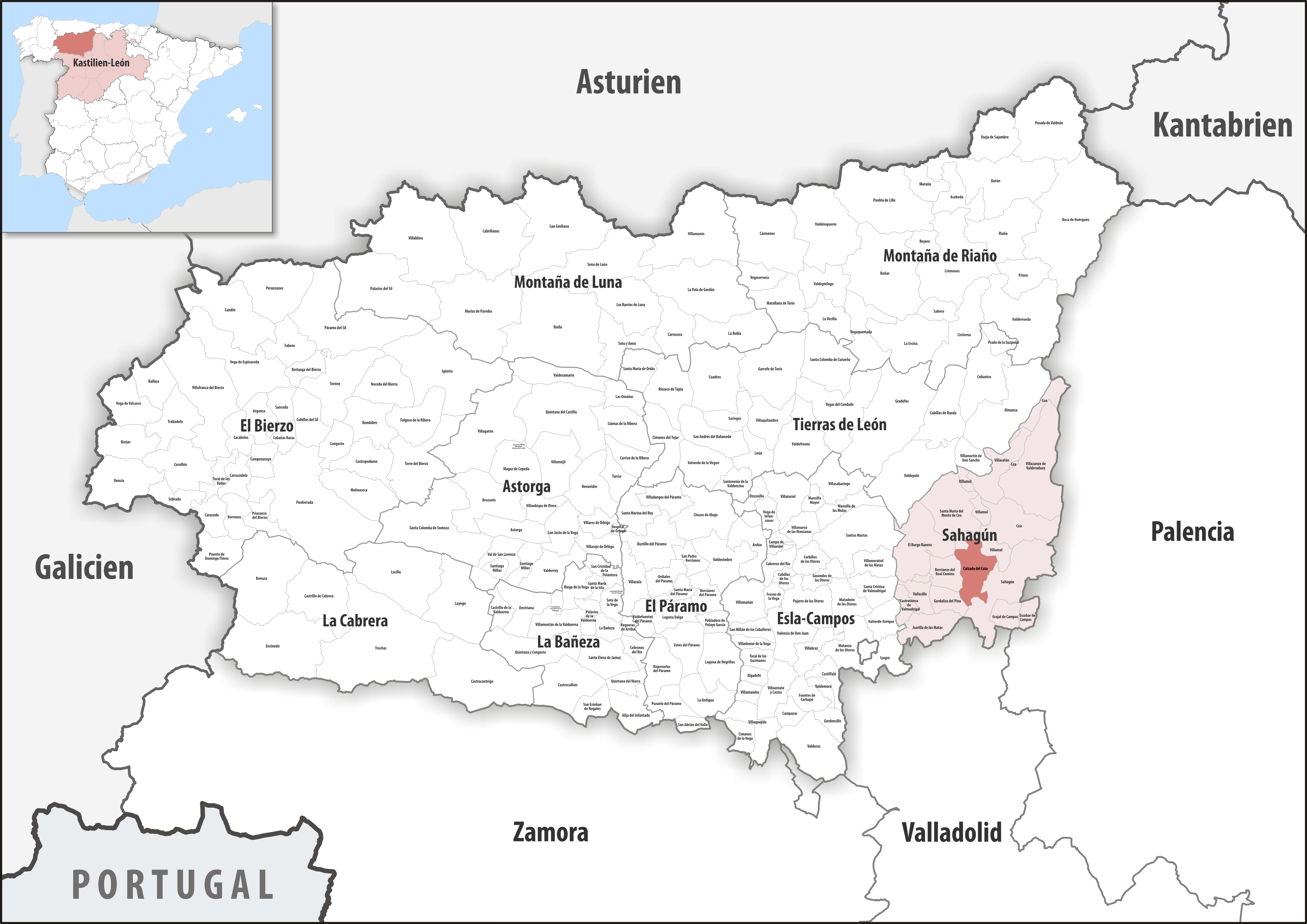
Calzada in the province of León

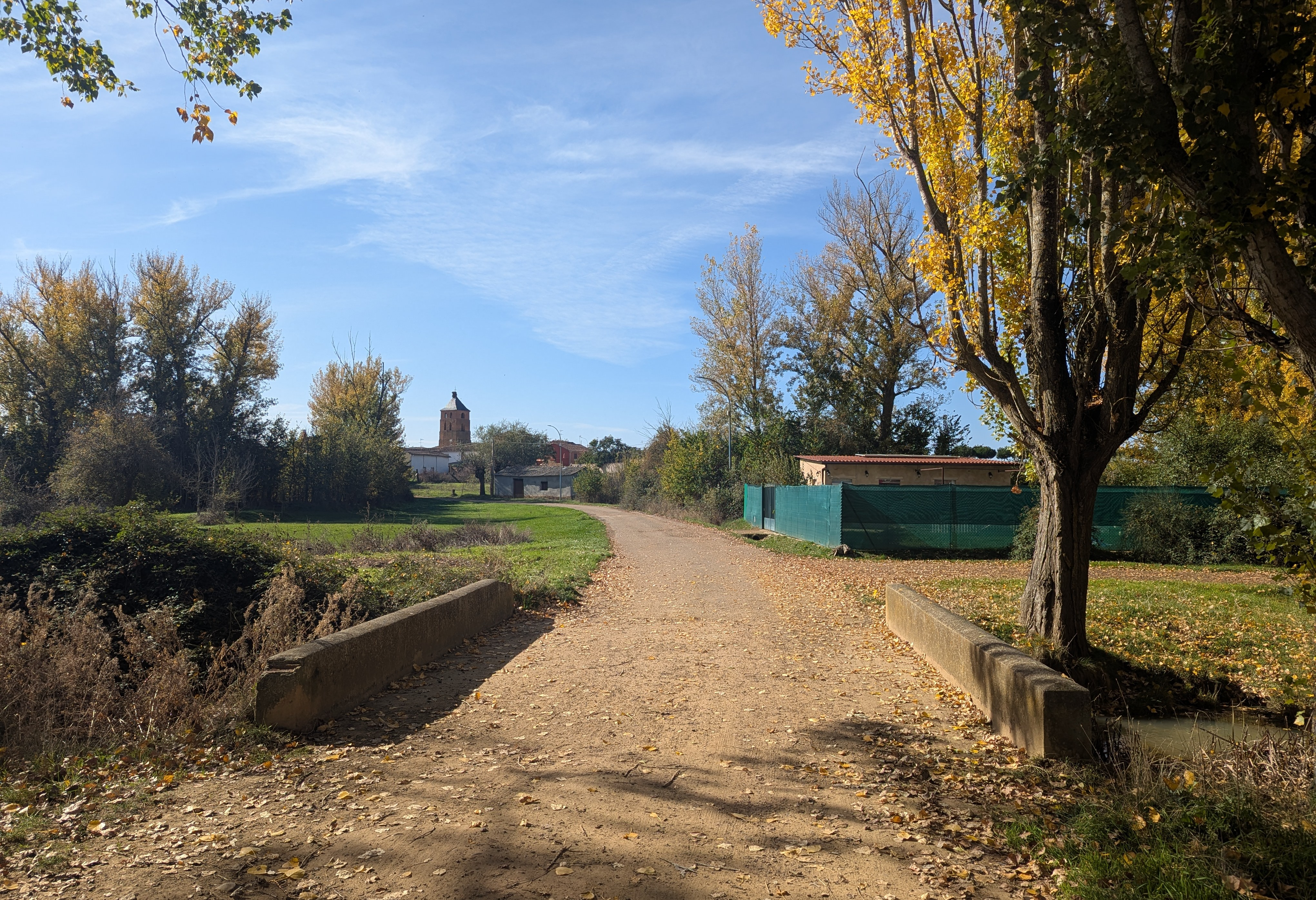
Bridge over Valdecalzada Stream

The municipality of Calzada del Coto covers an area of 56.03 km^{2} (21,63 sq mi), it is located in the southeast of the province of León, within the Tierra de Sahagún comarca. It is situaded in the eastern part of the Páramo, separated from the Tierra de Campos region by the Cea River. The terrain is characterized by a gentle relief with an average elevation of 820 meters (2,690 ft). The highest point is 880 m (2,890 ft) at the north-west, while the lowest is 788 m (2,585 ft) at the south-east. The municipality is part of the Duero River basin and is drained by several streams with irregular river flows like the Valdecalzada (El Reguero) and Valdelaguna streams, which are both tributaries of the Cea River. Several springs, such as La Fuente and Villarrubia, are found within the area. Along with small wetlands like Valdemorgate and Unguera lakes, although others have been historicallly drained for agricultural land.

The municipality of Calzada del Coto borders with several municipalities: At the northwest El Burgo Ranero, to the north lie Villamol and Santa María del Monte de Cea, to the northeast lies Villamol, to the west lies Bercianos del Real Camino, to the east lies Sahagún, to the southwest lies Gordaliza del Pino, to the south lie Gordaliza del Pino and Sahagún, and to the southeast lies again Sahagún.

Calzada del Coto has a continentalized Mediterranean climate, slyghtly influenced by the Cantabrian Mountains. Annual precipitation averages approximately 550 mm (21.7 in), concentrated mainly in spring and autumn. The average annual temperatures range from 10 to 12 °C (50 to 54 °F). Winters are cold, with frequent frosts and sub-zero average daily temperatures on several days while summers are hot and dry, with average temperatures often exceeding 20 °C (68 °F) in July and August. Calzada del Coto experiences about ten days of snowfall, two days of hail, and fifteen stormy days, primarily during June and July. Under the Köppen climate classification, the climate is classified as Csb, representing a transitional climate between Mediterranean and Oceanic types, characterized by mild summers and significant diurnal and seasonal temperature variations.

=== Nature and Wildlife ===
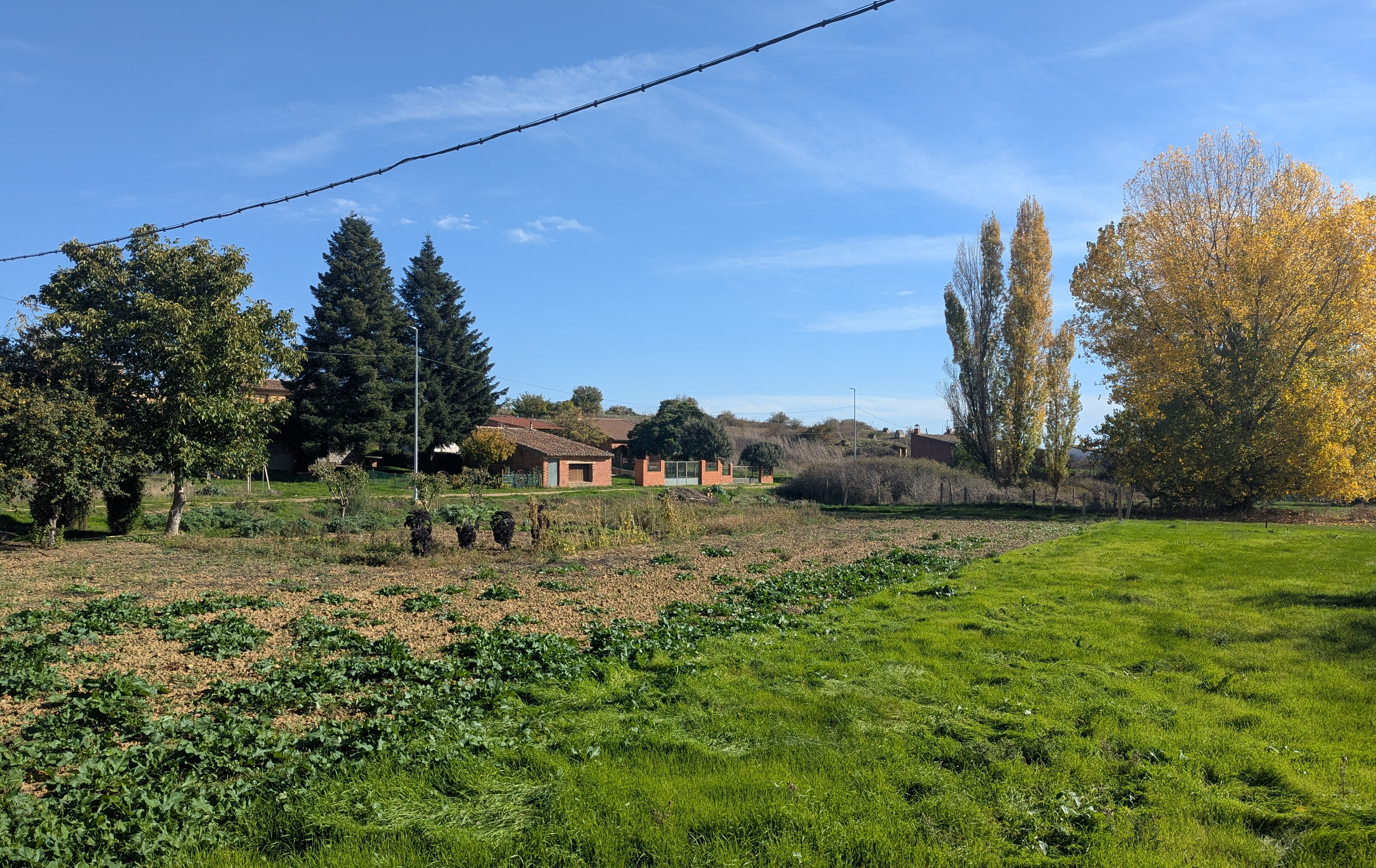
Orchards and pastures near Valdecalzada Stream

Calzada del Coto is home to a diverse range of wildlife, including vulnerable species like the bustard. As well as mammals such as rabbits, hares, wild boars and foxes. The area is rich in birdlife, featuring species like the black kite, common buzzard, and various owls. Amphibians and reptiles include the Iberian tree frog and ocellated lizard, while fish species such as trout and barbel inhabit local waters. The flora is characterized by evergreen trees such as holm oak and various conifers, as well as deciduous trees like black poplar and field elm, along with marcescent trees such as Portuguese oak and Spanish oak. Significant forested areas include the Valdelocajos and Maudes forests, which feature notable trees such as the Roble Mirador (Lookout Oak). Also, the Cea River and its riverside forest are protected as part of the Natura 2000 network, highlighting the area's ecological importance.

Additionally the municipality supports a variety of crops, both rainfed and irrigated, such as wheat, alfalfa, maize, vineyards and several fruit trees, primarily almond trees. Alongside a significant sheep and cattle livestock population, as well as a rabbit farm.

== Government and politics ==
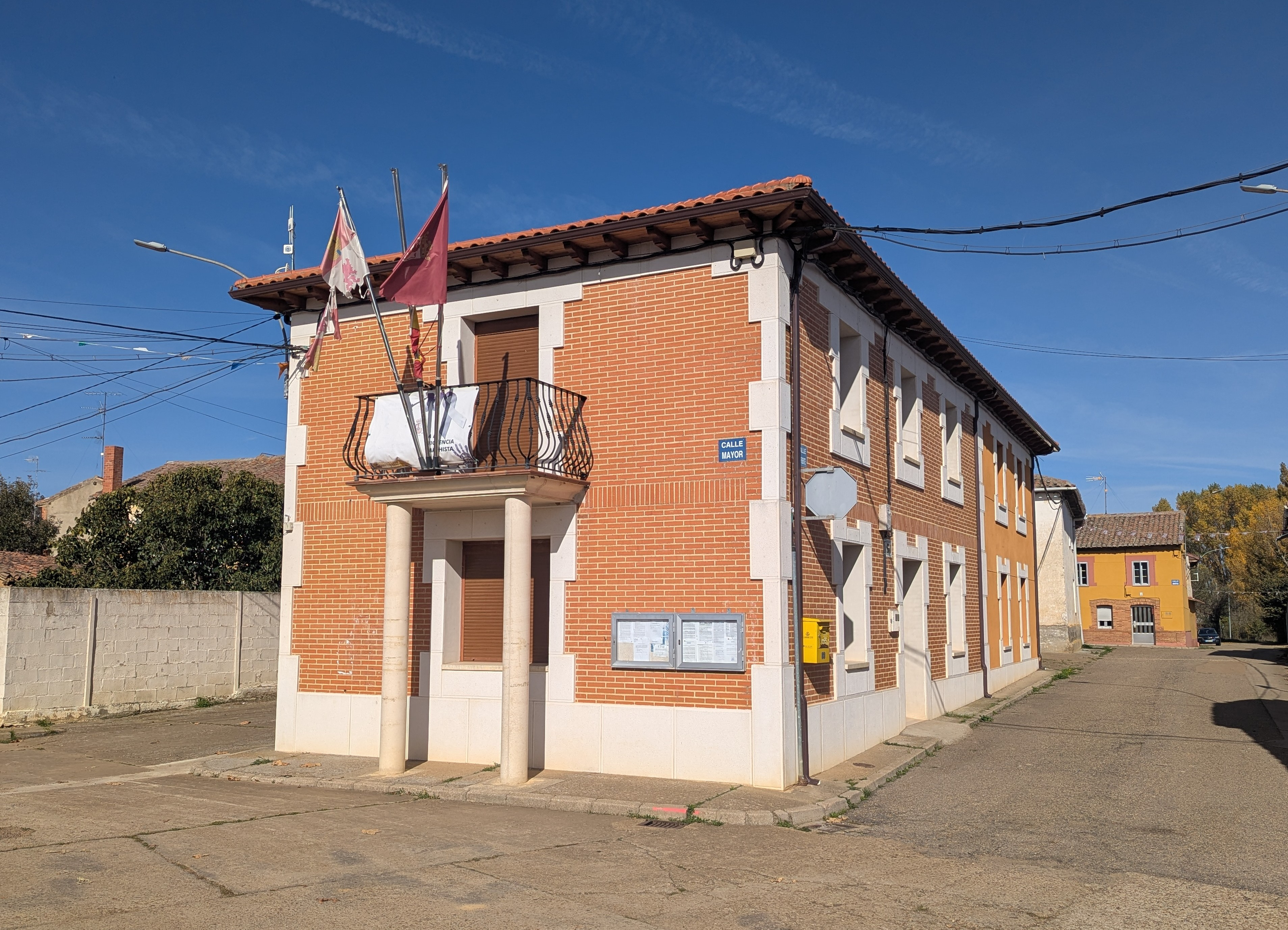
Calzada del Coto's Town Hall

The municipal government of Calzada del Coto is managed by a town council (ayuntamiento) consisting of 5 councillors (concejales) (Note: Due to population decline, the number of seats in the Town Council was reduced from seven to five starting with the 2019 municipal elections, as the municipality's population fell below the 250-inhabitant threshold established by Spanish electoral law.) elected every four years by direct universal suffrage in accordance with Spanish electoral law. The electoral roll includes Spanish citizens aged 18 or over registered in the municipality, as well as eligible foreign residents under the conditions established by law. The council is responsible for municipal services such as urban planning, public lighting, and waste collection. Since the 1979 democratic local elections, the centre-right parties have held the mayorship, with Pablo Carbajal Carbajal, from the People's Party (Partido Popular), currently serving as mayor (alcalde) since 1999.

The municipality also includes two minor local entities (Entidad de Ámbito Territorial Inferior al Municipio, EATIM), governed by two juntas vecinales (local councils), each presided over by a alcalde pedáneo (village mayor), which manage local competences—a role compatible with holding the municipal mayorship. Currently, Pablo Carbajal Carbajal serves as the village mayor of Calzada del Coto, while Rubén Vallejo Valdeón holds the position in Codornillos.

Judicially, it falls under the judicial district (partido judicial) number 1 of the province of León, with its seat in Sahagún.

=== Results of the municipal elections since 1979 ===
City councilors in the Town Council of Calzada del Coto since 1979
Key to parties Parties in the legend and seat distributions are ordered from left to right according to their ideological position. PSOE UPL UPyD Cs UCD PP AP CP CD
Election	Distribution	Mayor
1979	1 / 5 / 1	Faustino Guerra Díez (UCD) (1979–1983)
1983	1 / 6	Isaías Andrés Encina (CD, AP, PP) (1983–1995)
1987	2 / 5	Isaías Andrés Encina (CD, AP, PP) (1983–1995)
1991	2 / 5	Isaías Andrés Encina (CD, AP, PP) (1983–1995)
1995	3 / 4	Cayetano Herrero Rojo (PP) (1995–1999)
1999	3 / 4	Pablo Carbajal Carbajal (PP) (1999– current)
2003	2 / 5	Pablo Carbajal Carbajal (PP) (1999– current)
2007	2 / 5	Pablo Carbajal Carbajal (PP) (1999– current)
2011	1 / 6	Pablo Carbajal Carbajal (PP) (1999– current)
2015	3 / 4	Pablo Carbajal Carbajal (PP) (1999– current)
2019	1 / 4	Pablo Carbajal Carbajal (PP) (1999– current)
2023	1 / 4	Pablo Carbajal Carbajal (PP) (1999– current)

== Demographics ==
Historical population
Year	Pop.	±% p.a.
1857	707	—
1860	595	−5.59%
1877	743	+1.32%
1887	739	−0.05%
1897	747	+0.11%
1900	784	+1.62%
1910	849	+0.80%
1920	752	−1.21%
1930	827	+0.96%
1940	939	+1.28%
1950	858	−0.90%
1960	825	−0.39%
1970	594	−3.23%
1981	440	−2.69%
1991	347	−2.35%
2001	293	−1.68%
2011	255	−1.38%
2021	218	−1.56%
Instituto Nacional de Estadística

According to the 2024 census (INE), the municipality has a current population of 223, of whom 134 are male and 89 are female. The immigrant population was estimated at 11 individuals, representing 4.91% of the total population (INE 2022). The population density was 4 people per km^{2} (10.0/sq mi). The average age of 57.85 years (INE 2023) is typical of the rural areas of Spain, characterized by an aging population and a near disappearance of annual birth rates.

The rural exodus, which began in the second half of the 20th century, led to a demographic decline as residents migrated to more dynamic areas like León or Asturias. Despite this overall decrease, the maximum seasonal population can reach around 620 people, indicating that many former residents and their offspring return during certain times of the year, especially in August during the patronal feasts and in Holy Week, contributing to the local economy and community life.

Population centers of Calzada del Coto
Population entity	Coordinates	Pop. (2024)	Map
Calzada del Coto	42°23'15"N, 5°4'50"W	186	Calzada del Coto: Interactive map of Calzada del Coto
Codornillos	42°24'7.88″ N, 5°3'13.44″ W	37	Calzada del Coto: Interactive map of Calzada del Coto
Total		223	Calzada del Coto: Interactive map of Calzada del Coto
Source: INE, 2024			Source: IGN

== Main sights ==
Calzada del Coto is characterized by its historic-artistic heritage, which includes religious architecture featuring several medieval churches, as well as traditional civil architecture such as wineries and a mill. The region's clayey lands have led to the historical prevalence of "mud architecture," using adobe and rammed earth in the traditional construction of one- or two-story houses with gabled or hipped roofs where heating was commonly provided by 'glorias,' a system inspired by Roman hypocausts. In contrast, modern constructions are characterized by plastered facades and new brick buildings, which differ significantly from the traditional architectural styles.

=== Camino de Santiago ===
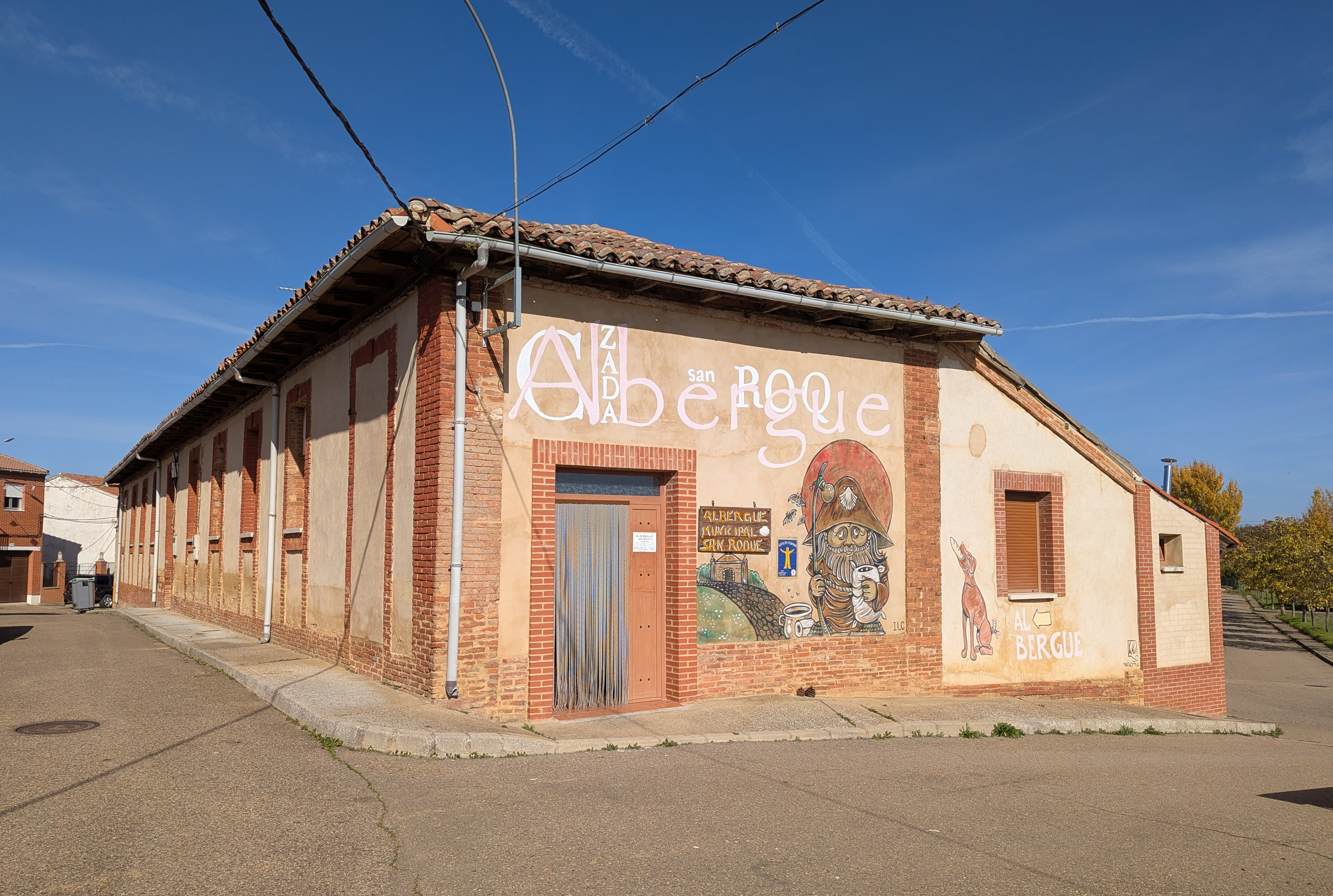
Pilgrims Hostel

The Way of Saint James (Camino de Santiago) is a famous pilgrimage route that has been declared a World Heritage Site. It encompasses several paths leading to the tomb of the apostle James in Santiago de Compostela, with the French Way being the most well-known and heavily traveled. This way crosses Calzada del Coto where it splitts into two paths, one of which is also an ancient Roman road. The Camino inspired various customs rooted in charity, such as the palo de los pobres (stick of the poor), which mandated that neighbors provide shelter and meals to pilgrims and travelers, with the stick symbolizing this duty being passed in strict rotation.

- San Roque Pilgrims Hostel (Albergue de peregrinos San Roque): A public pilgrim hostel opened in 2014, located in a former school building, offering 36 beds, including some accessible options.

=== Religious architecture ===
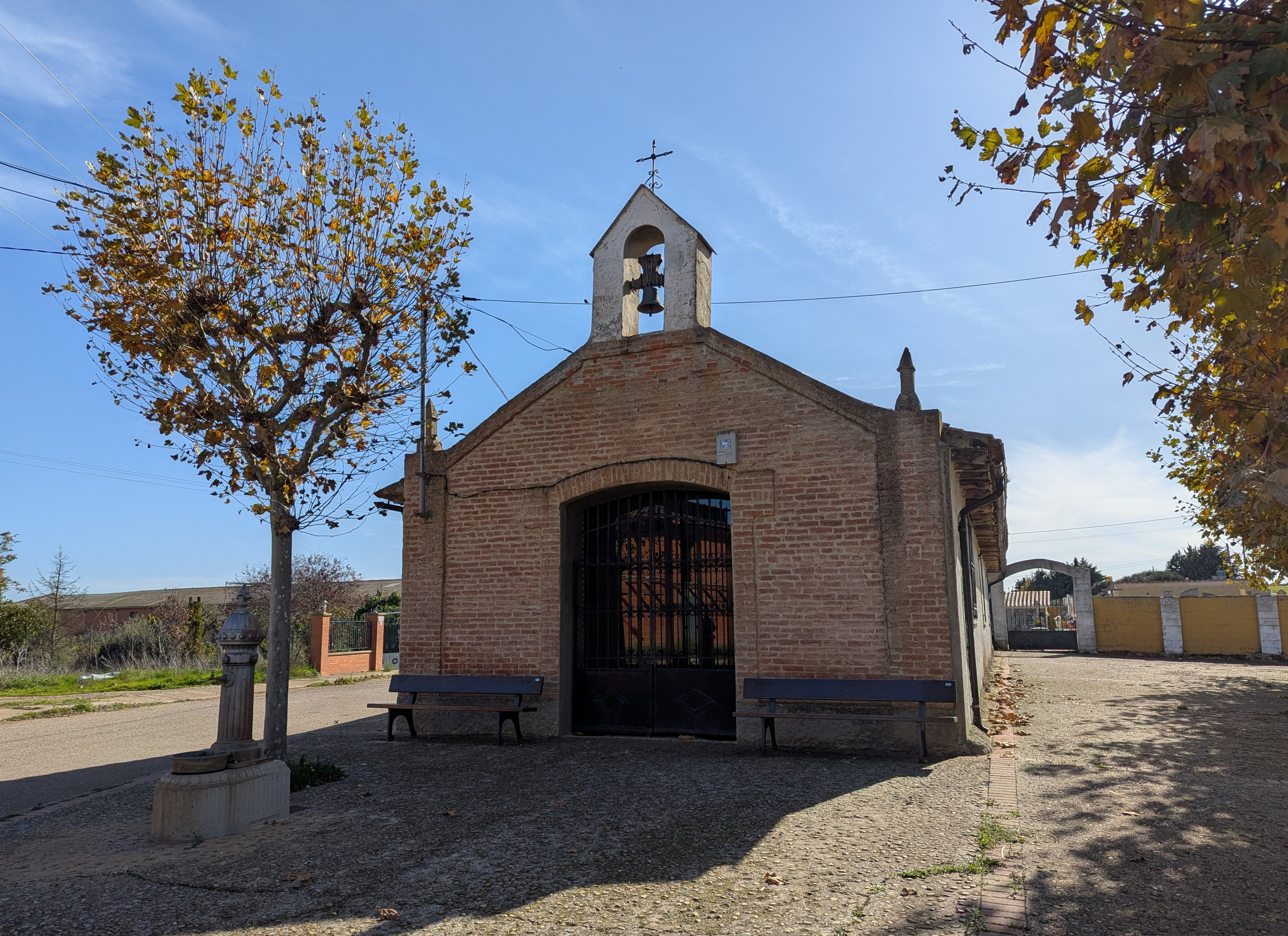
Hermitage of San Roque

- Church of San Esteban (Iglesia de San Esteban): A late 14th-century Catholic church dedicated to Saint Stephen, built of brick and rammed earth, was constructed on the site of an earlier church. It features a notable square tower and an 18th-century Baroque altarpiece.
- Chapel of San Roque (Ermita de San Roque): A late 19th-century hermitage built on the site of a 15th-century structure, this brick edifice is dedicated to Saint Roch and holds significance for local festivities and folklore. The local cemetery is adjacent to the hermitage.
- Church of San Pelayo (Iglesia de San Pelayo): A church located in Codornillos dedicated to Saint Pelagius, built of brick and rammed earth.
- Chapels of Villarrubia, Nuestra Señora del Villar and Virgen del Valle: A series of hermitages of medieval origin once distributed throughout the municipality of Calzada del Coto, abandoned or even burned (Virgen del Valle) during the Spanish confiscation in the 19th century.

=== Civil architecture ===
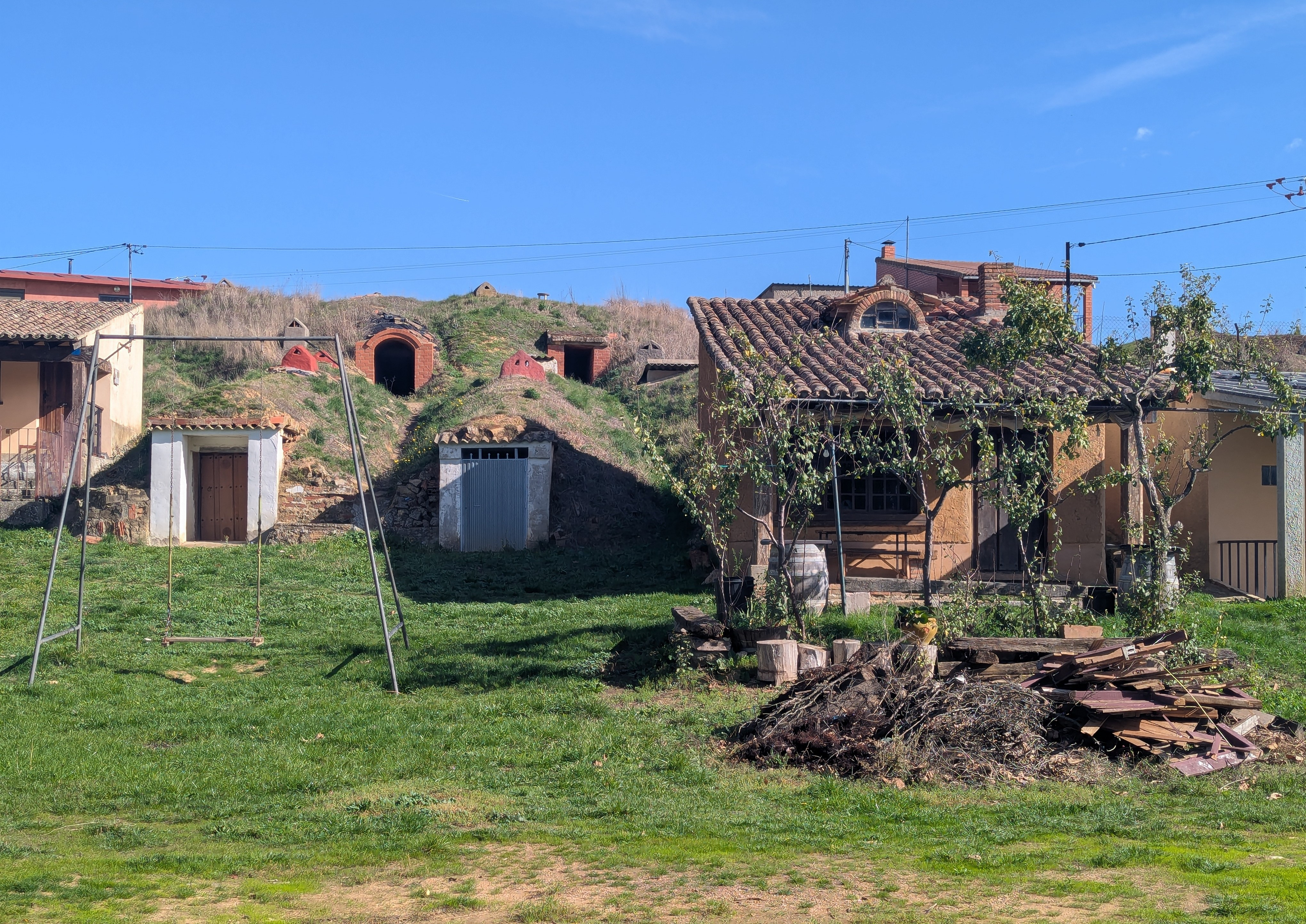
Section of the Barrio de las Bodegas and big swing

- Barrio de las Bodegas (Winery Quartier): Excavated in the late 17th or 18th century, these wine cellars were originally used for winemaking and aging wine. This function is now complemented by their use as picnic areas (merenderos) for locals, showcasing the winemaking heritage of Calzada.
- Codornillos Railway Bridge: Located over the Cea River, was designed by Eduardo Saavedra and built in the 19th century with a Town lattice structure. It was originally dismantled in the 1930s due to line modernization and replaced by two twin Pratt lattice bridges, which are wider and reinforced while retaining elements of 19th century railway style.
- Molino de los Campos (Mill of the Fields): This historic watermill near Codornillos uses the current from the Valdelaguna Spring and an irrigation ditch coming from the Cea River. Constructed of adobe, it is currently abandoned and ruined.
- Roman Villa in Valdelaguna: A Roman villa existed in the 2nd century in the location of Valdelaguna, south of Calzada, of which only some mosaics remain. Subsequently, it became the largest pantry of the Monastery of Sahagún, and its importance was such that it came to be a priory of the same. It is currently a farm.

== Culture ==
Jota de San Roque, recorded in 1976

The culture of Calzada del Coto is deeply rooted in the broader traditions of the region, exemplified by symbols such as the Leonese pendón, a traditional banner emblematic of local identity. However, the village possesses some unique cultural practices, most notably the Carro de la Hoguera, a distinctive tradition that sets it apart. Local variants of traditional dances, such as the jota del Perejil and the jota de San Roque, reflect the community's adaptation of the Spanish jota dance. While traditional games, including the juego de la pita, are also part of local festivities and social gatherings. Additionally, the heartfelt tonada known as "Madre" stands out as a medley of traditional songs. Like many rural communities, Calzada del Coto has experienced the effects of rural flight, which has led to the transformation or, in some cases, the loss of certain customs and traditions like the pastorada.

=== Carro de la Hoguera ===
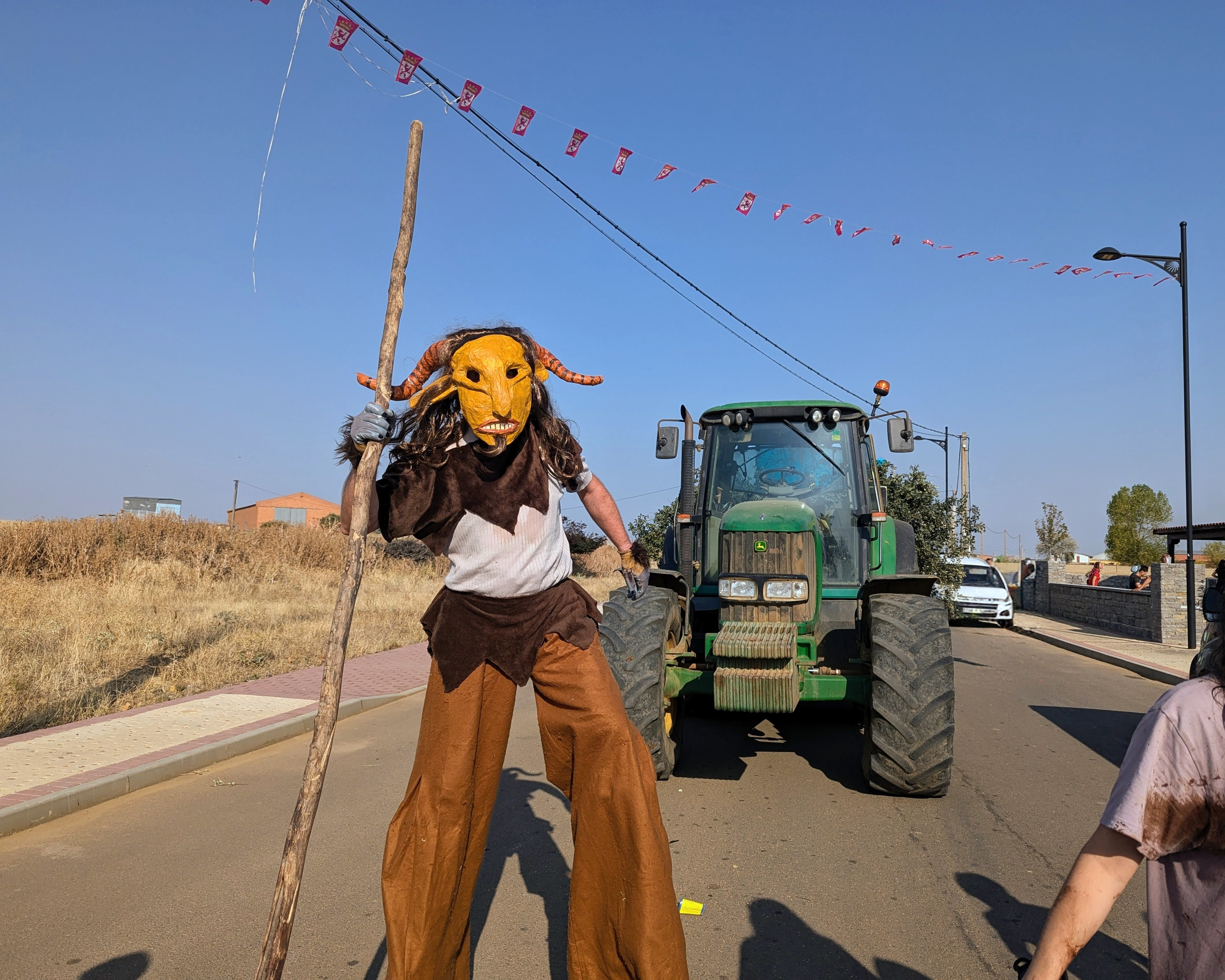
Carro de la Hoguera from 2025

Traditionally, every August from the 14th to the 17th, festivities are held in honor of the town's patron, Saint Roch. These celebrations are of great importance to the young people of the village, as the "quintos" of that year (young people who turn 18) participate in organizing the festivities, especially in the traditional Carro de la Hoguera (Bonfire Cart), of which they are the main protagonists. The Carro de la Hoguera is a unique celebration of Calzada del Coto, observed since the early 19th century, which could be considered as a rite of passage. The process begins at dawn on August 15, when the "quintos" and locals ascend the nearby forests to gather holm oak firewood, which is loaded onto the Carro de la Hoguera, a cart traditionally pulled by oxen and, more recently, by a tractor, with the "quintos" riding on it.

The return of the cart is marked by a vibrant procession, during which the townspeople receive the Carro while singing the "Madre", a traditional song cherished by the locals, at least seven times, and spraying water (manguerazos). The procession culminates in front of the town hall, where the "quintos" dismount from the cart and are lifted onto the shoulders of their peers, only to be thrown into el Reguero stream or fountain. The San Roque Bonfire is lit at midnight of August 16. Villagers gather around the bonfire to throw branches, which are distributed by the "quintos," into the flames while making wishes, reinforcing community bonds and cultural heritage.

=== Cuisine ===
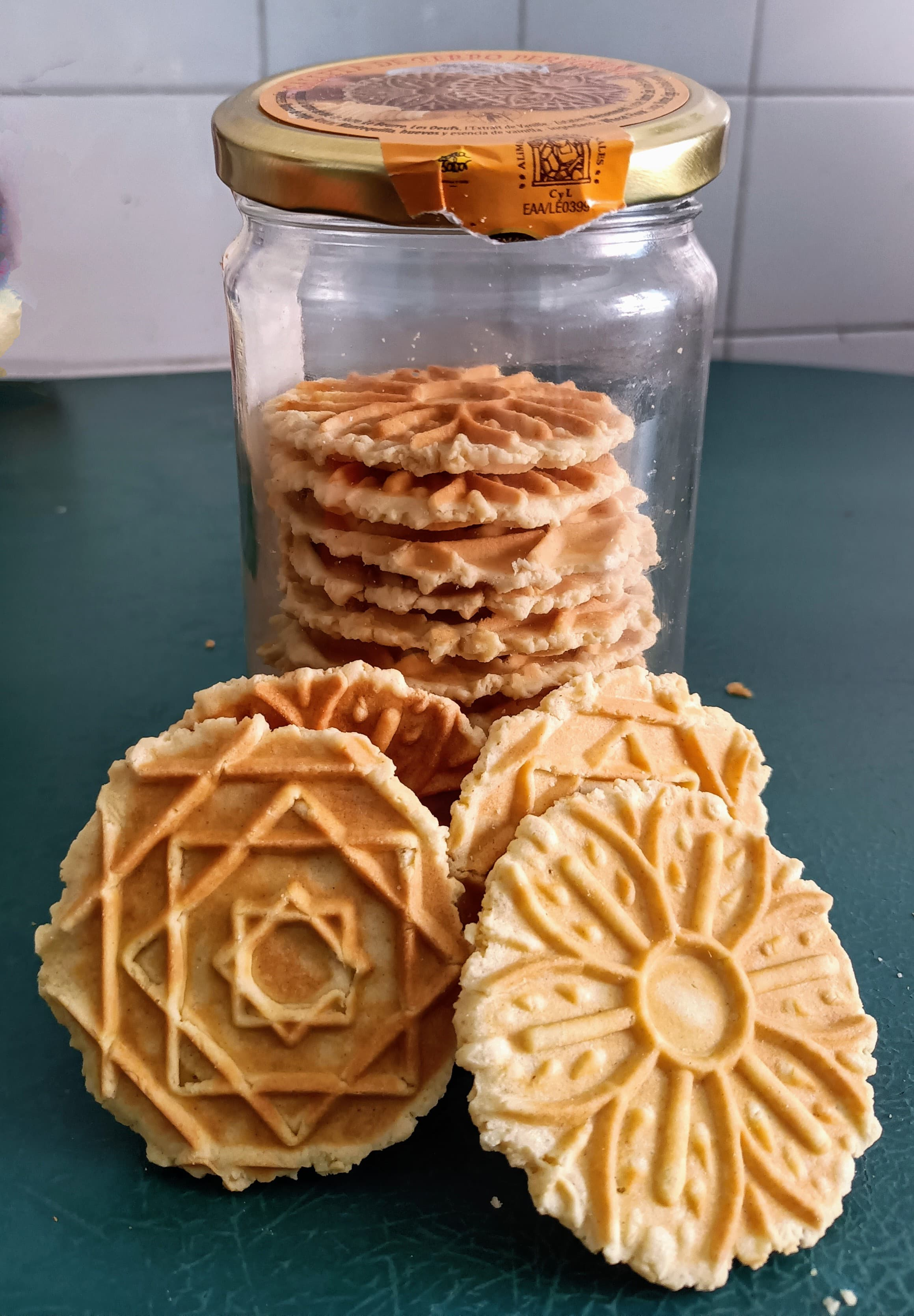
Jar of galletas de hierro

The cuisine of Calzada del Coto is mainly based on locally sourced foods, featuring some unique culinary offerings, such as the galletas de hierro (iron cookies). These delicate cookies are made from wheat flour, sugar, butter, eggs, and vanilla essence, and are distinguished by their unique preparation method using hot iron plates, which gives them their name. Among the local beverages, orujo arreglado, or simply arreglao, is a traditional drink made from local aguardiente de orujo (a type of pomace brandy) mixed with coffee or caramel, depending on the occasion. Is especially popular during festivities.

Other traditional products include wine from the DO León, which is traditionally made from the Mencía grape and, more recently, from the Prieto Picudo variety; famous Sahagún leeks; frog legs; crayfish; legumes such as chickpeas and Pardina lentils, which fall under the PGI of Tierra de Campos; dairy products like pata de mulo cheese (mule's leg cheese); and meat derivatives such as Leonese cecina or chorizo. Additionally, desserts include the aforementioned galletas de hierro and mariquitas, a type of rectangular-shaped muffin.

== Gallery ==
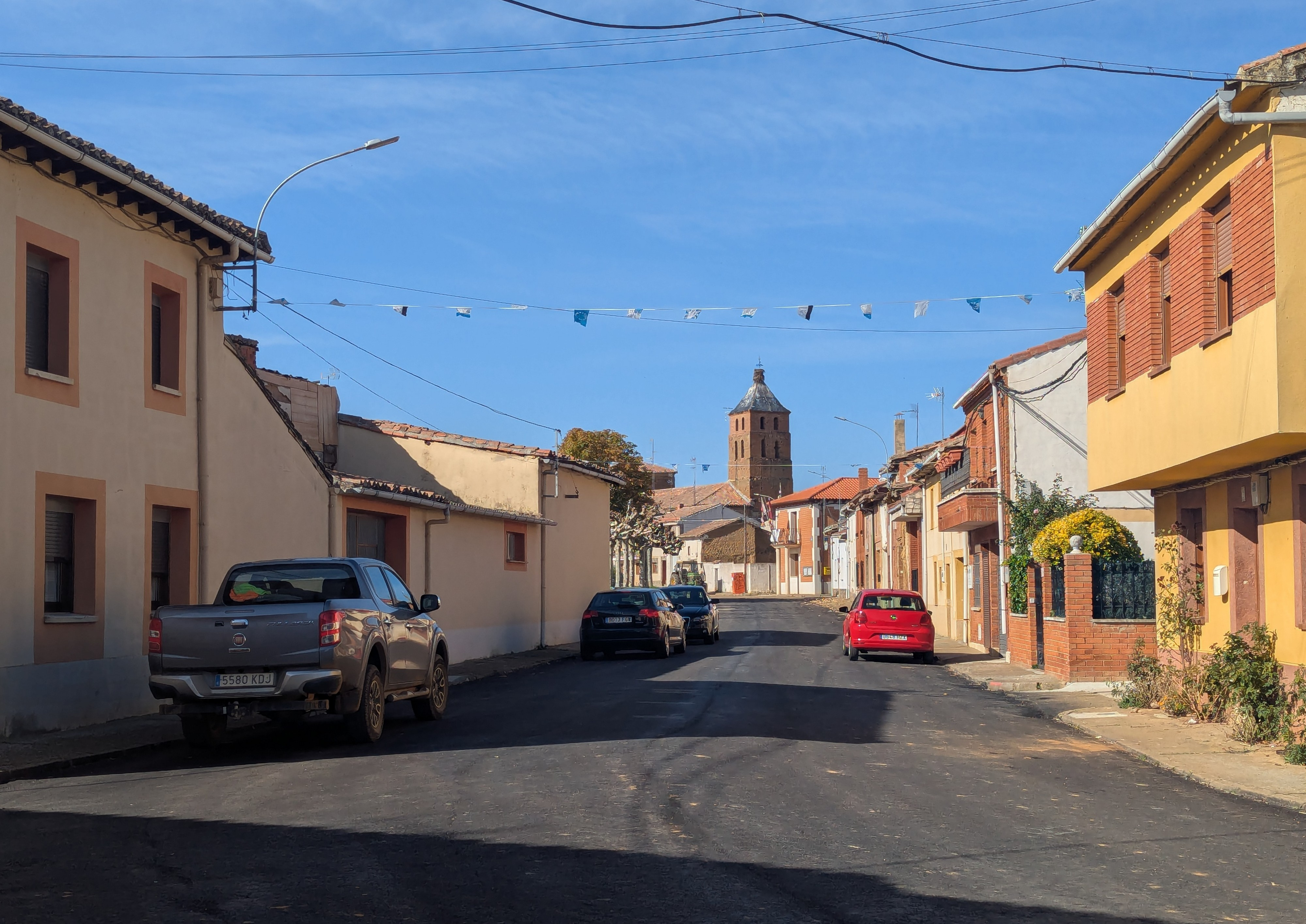
Calle Mayor

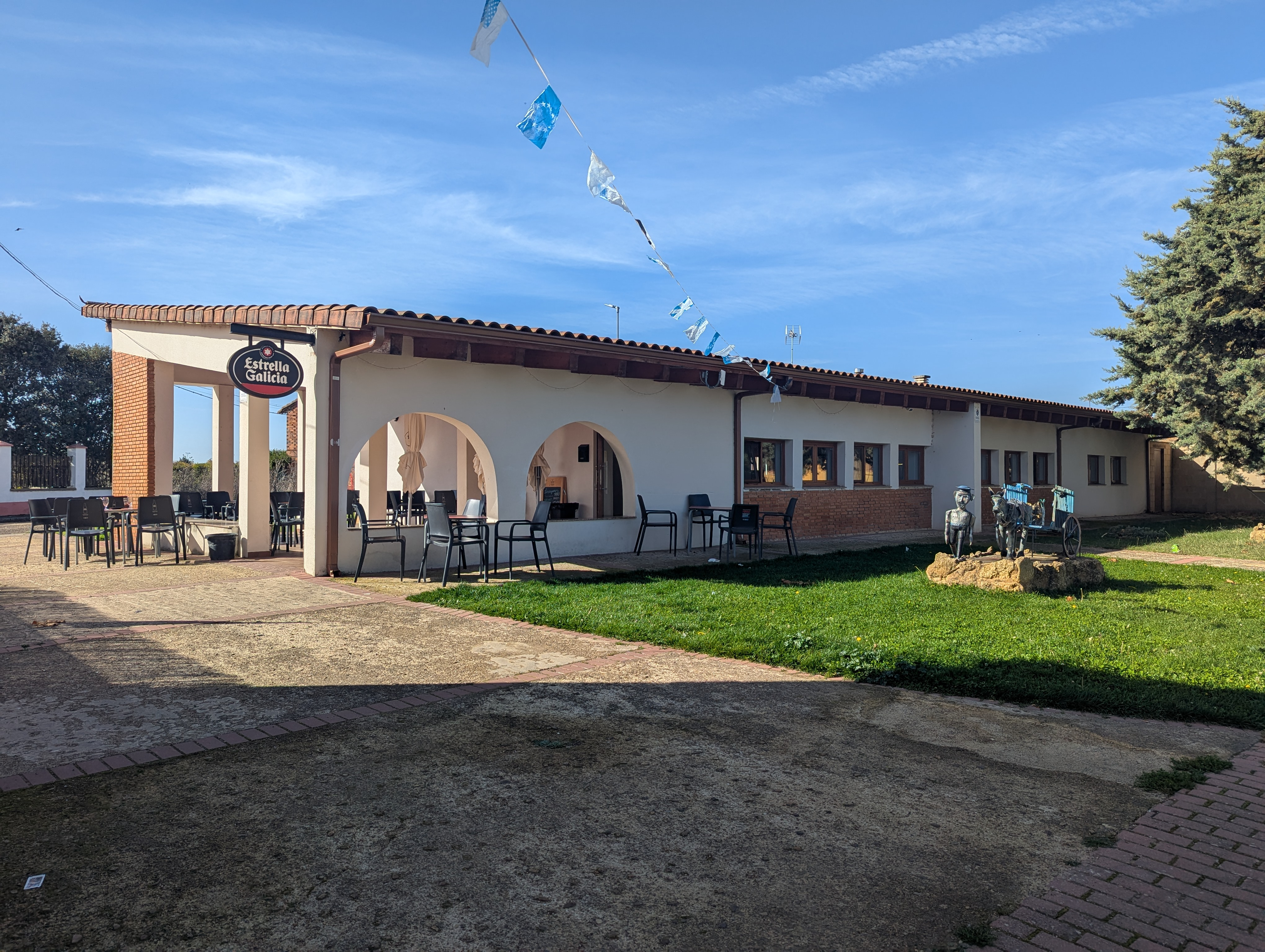
Bar Xanadú

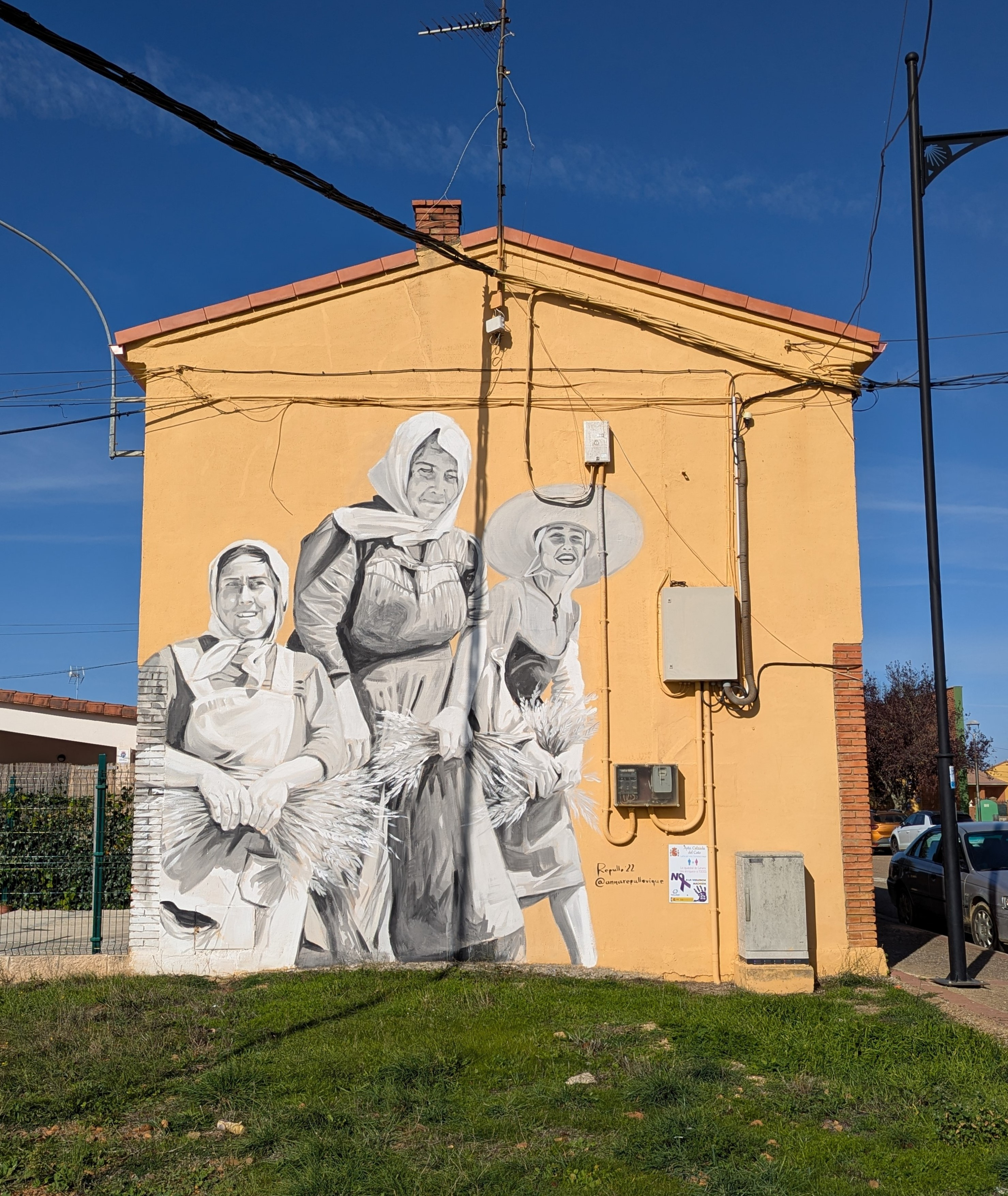
Mural to Rural Women

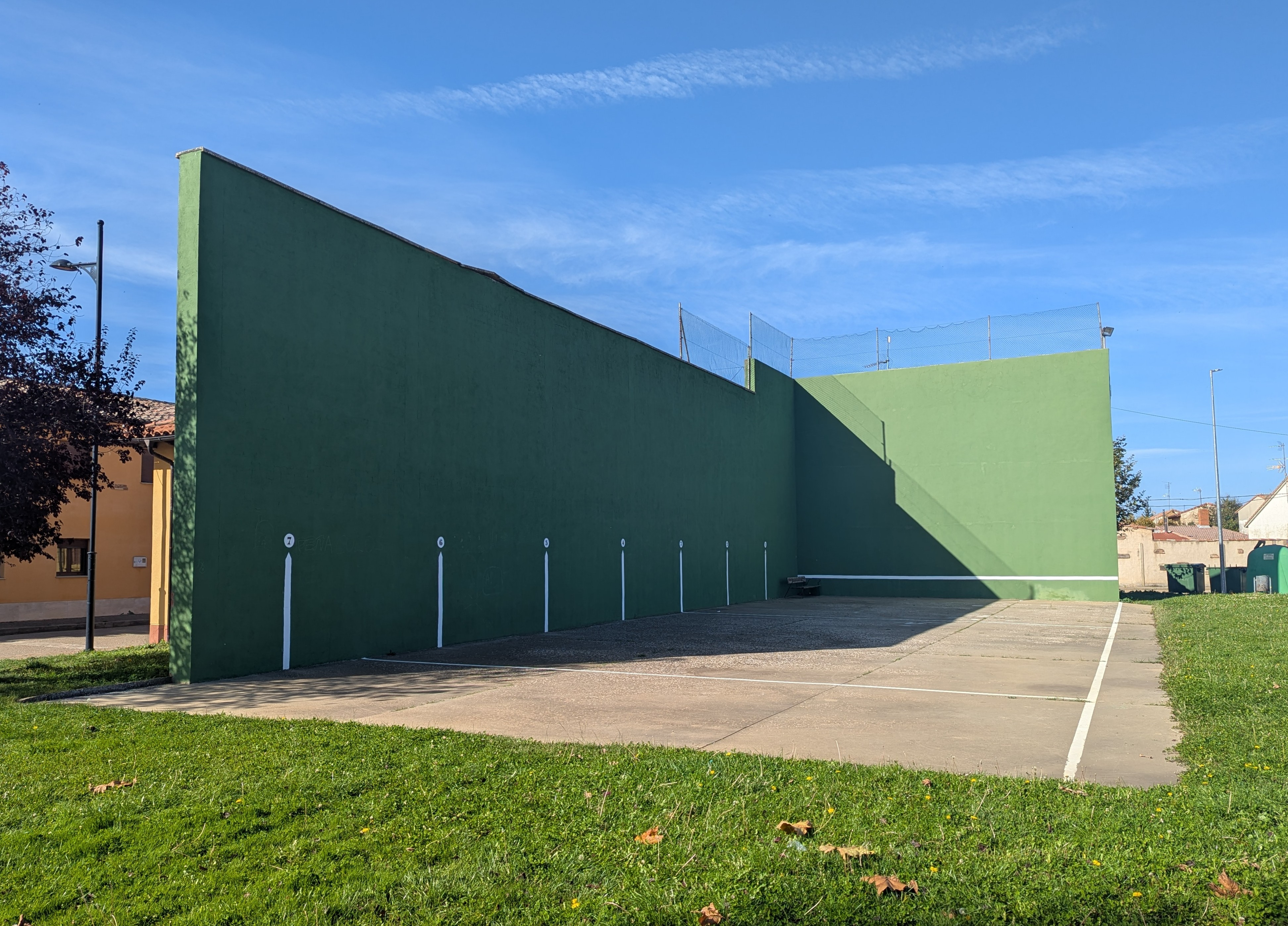
Fronton

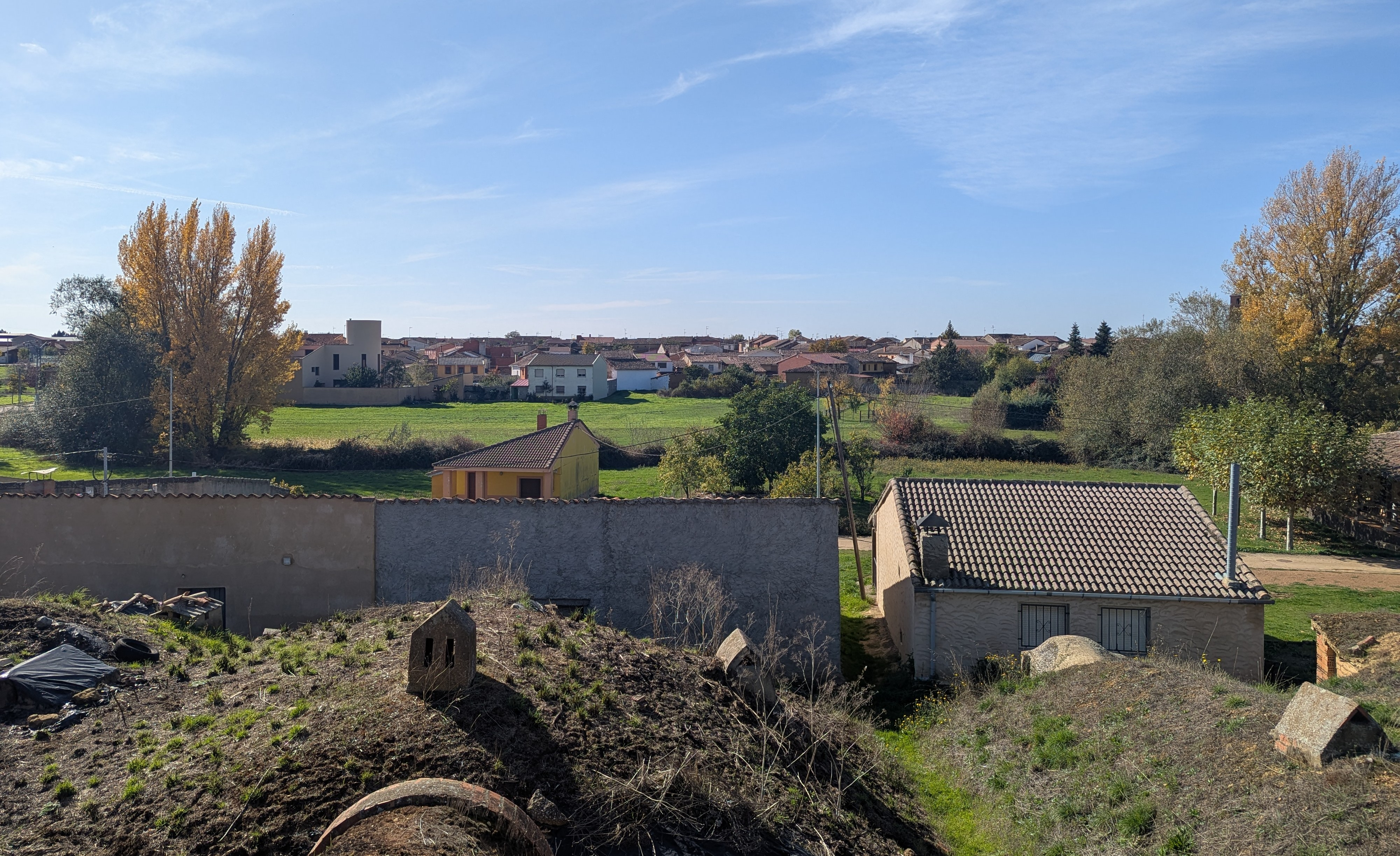
Calzada del Coto from the Wineries

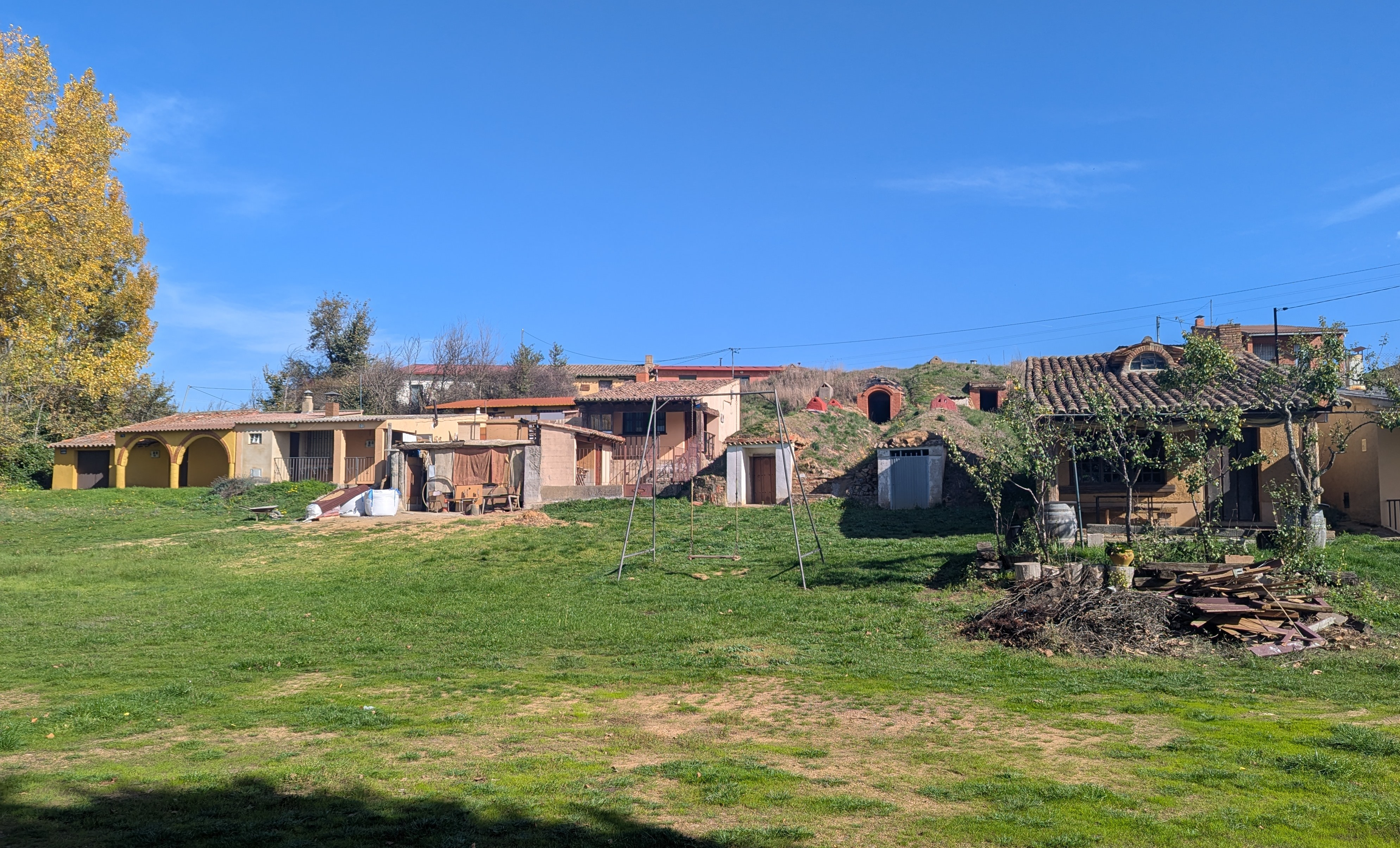
Wineries

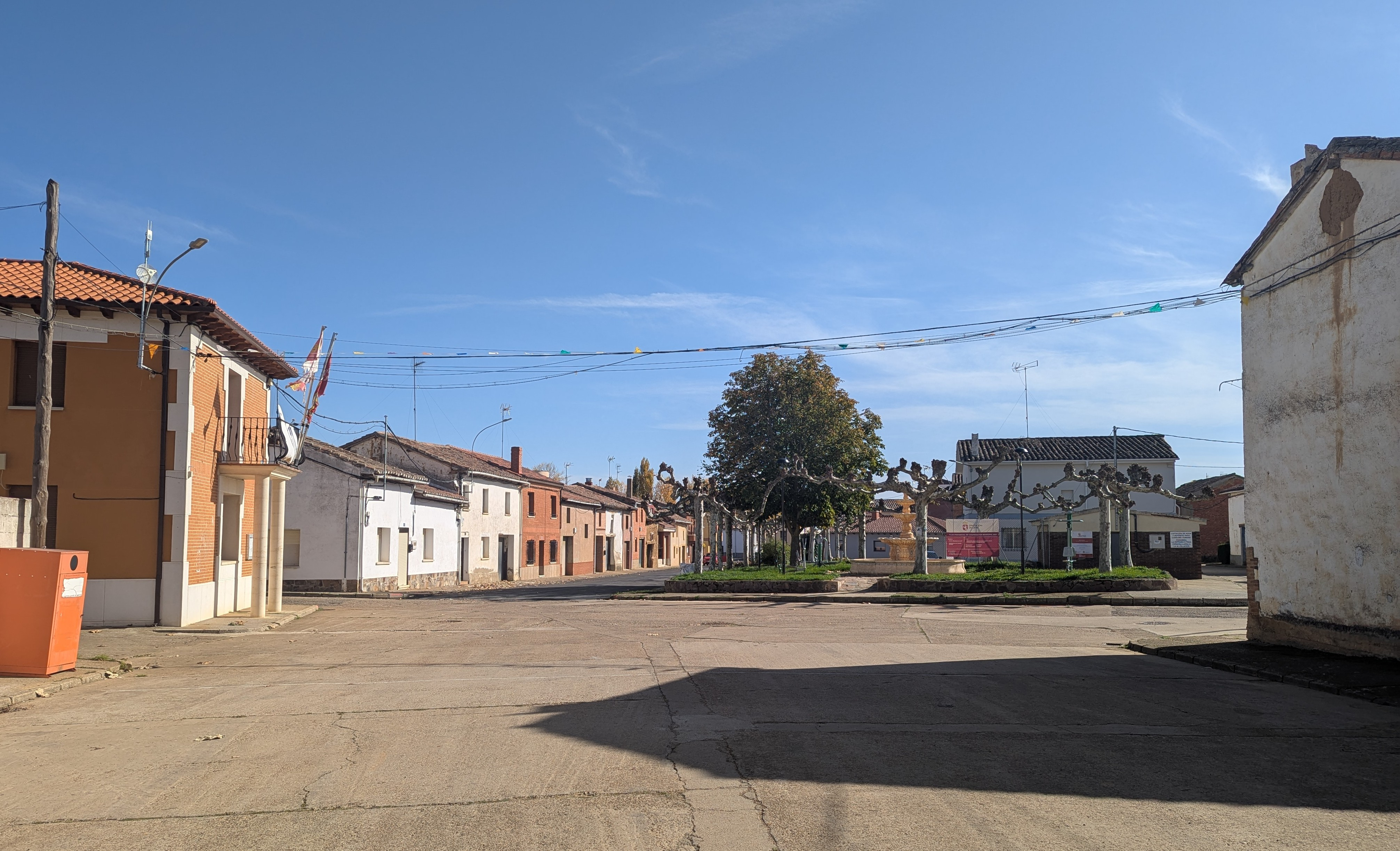
Calle Mayor

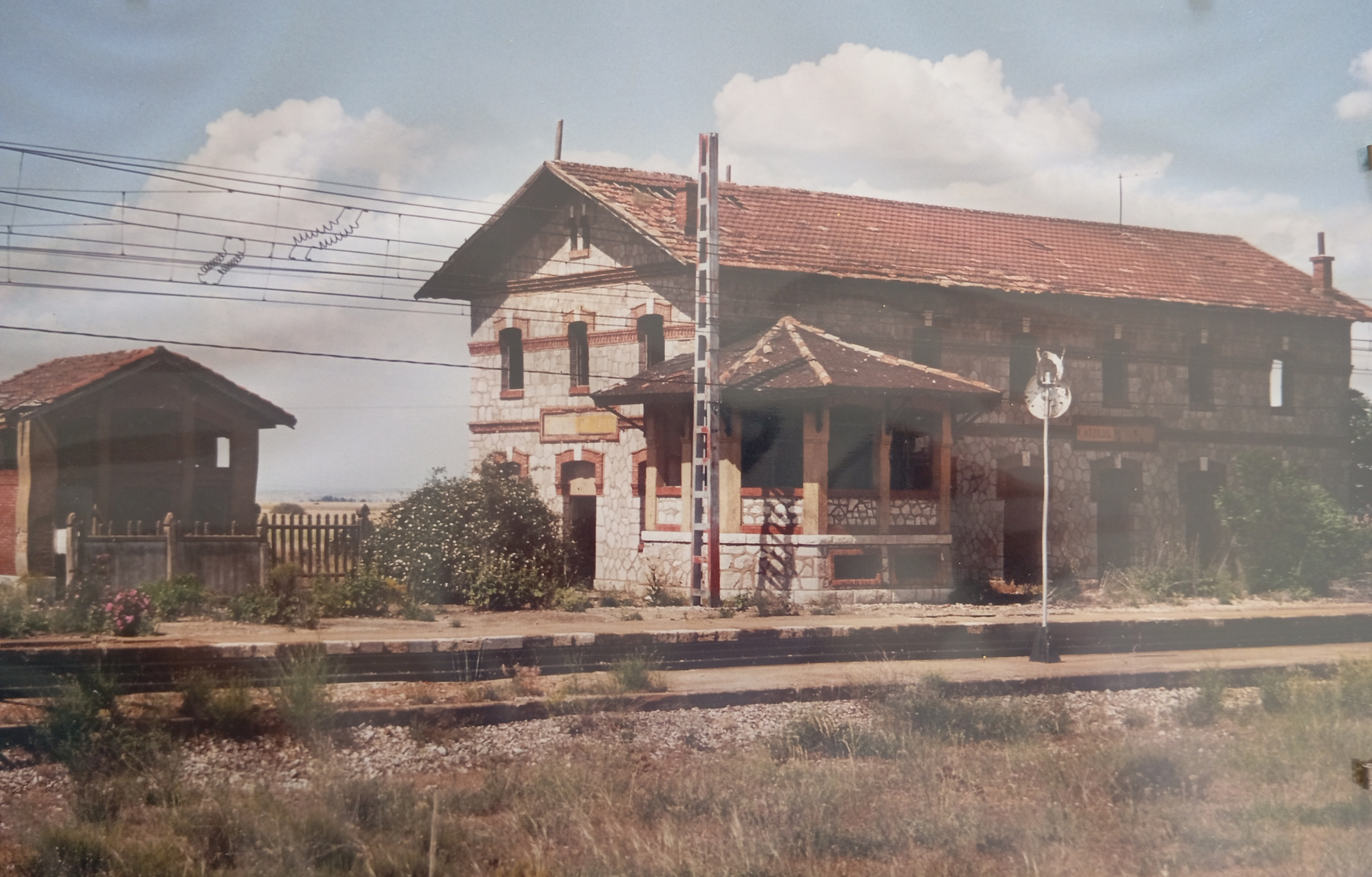
Old train station

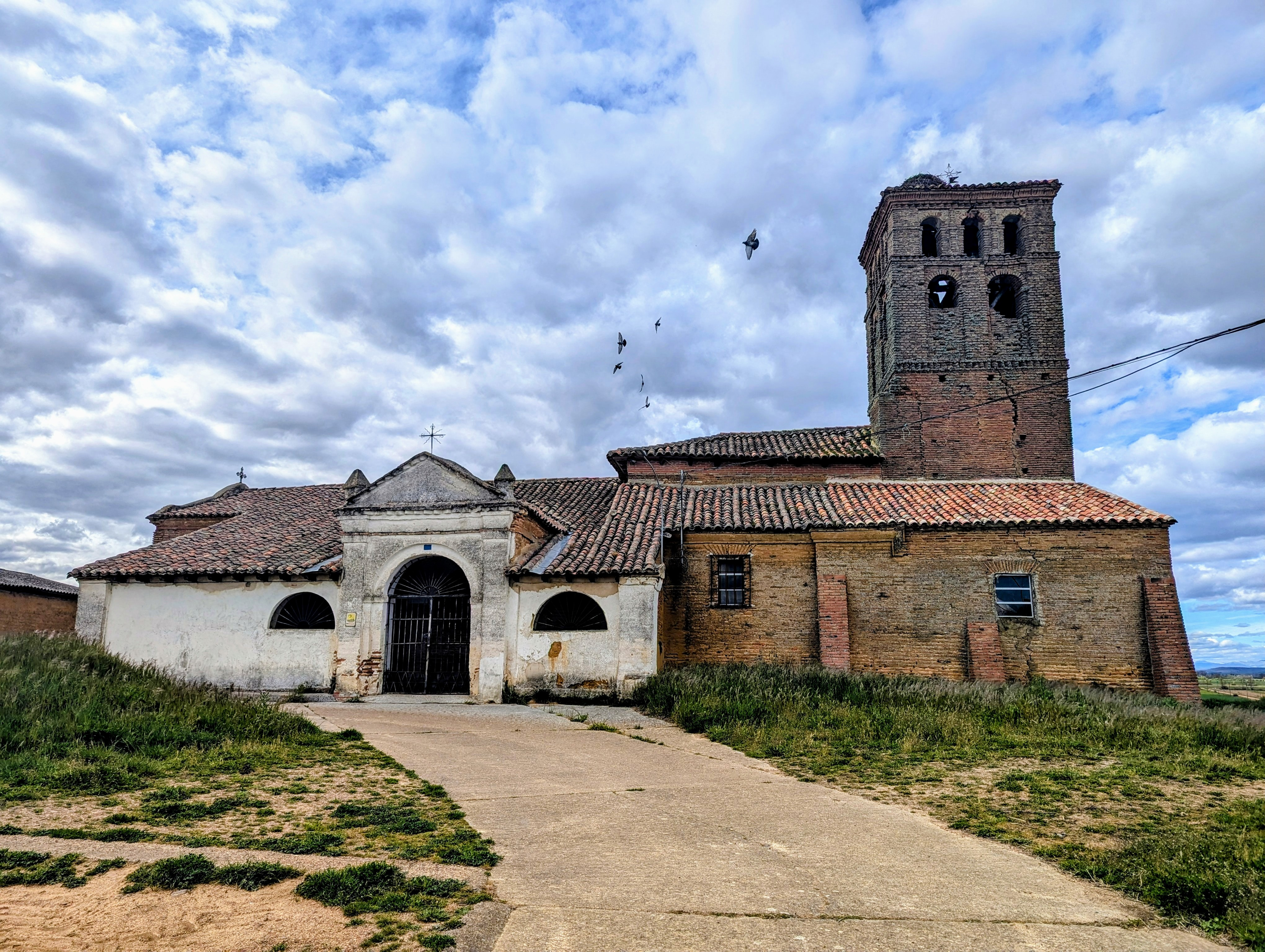
Church of Codornillos
