= Calzadilla de los Hermanillos =

Village in León, Spain

Coordinates: 42°25′59″N 5°9′20″W

- Locality
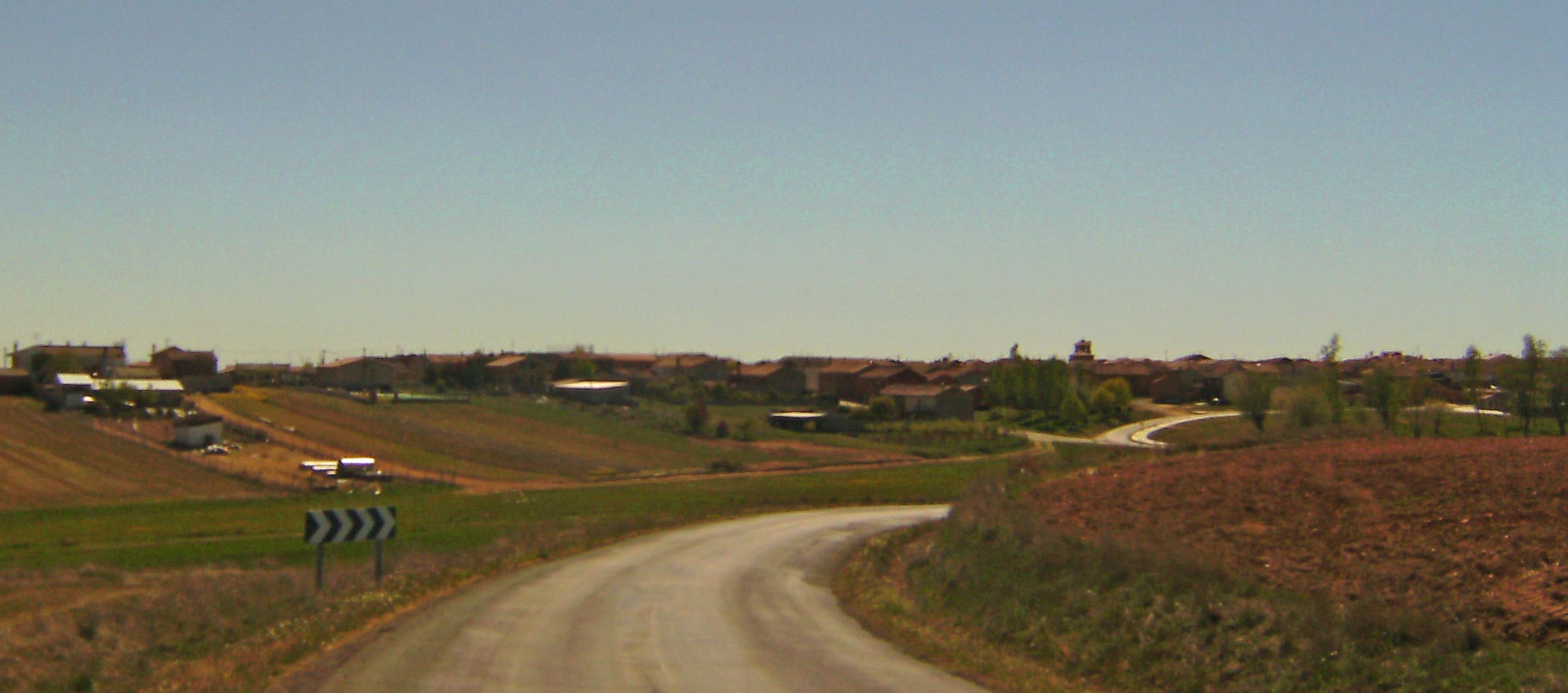
- View of Calzadilla de los Hermanillos
- Interactive map of Calzadilla de los Hermanillos
- Country: Spain
- Province: León
- Municipality: El Burgo Ranero
- Comarca: Tierra de Sahagún

Population (2023)
  - Total: 132
- Website: Calzadilla de los Hermanillos (El Burgo Ranero)

Calzadilla de los Hermanillos (Spanish pronunciation: [kˌalθaðˈiʎa dˈe lˈos ˌeɾmanˈiʎos]) is a locality belonging to the municipality of El Burgo Ranero, inside the province of León, autonomous community of Castile and León (Spain). It belongs to the comarca of Tierra de Sahagún and to the judicial district of Sahagún. According to the 2024 census (INE), Calzadilla de los Hermanillos has a population of 132 inhabitants.

Calzadilla de los Hermanillos lies in the Camino de Santiago, specifically by the French Way. It is located 8.5 kilometers (5.3 miles) after Calzada del Coto, which is traditionally considered the starting point of the Roman road Via Trajana variant. Once pilgrims leave Calzadilla, pilgrims can choose to continue along the Via Trajana till Mansilla de las Mulas (24 km, 14.9 mi) bypassing Reliegos or retake the Camino Francés in El Burgo Ranero (5.5 km, 3.4 mi) or Reliegos (18km, 11.2 mi).

The toponym refers to the original Roman road and therefore the Way of St. James, Calzadilla (a diminutive of Calzada, meaning footpath), and the phrase 'de los Hermanillos' (of the little brothers, in the sense of minor friars). It wasn't until the 19th-century Madoz Dictionary that the full name 'Calzadilla de los Hermanillos' is found written.
