= Codornillos =

Village in León, Spain

Coordinates: 42°24′7.88″N 5°3′13.44″W

- Locality
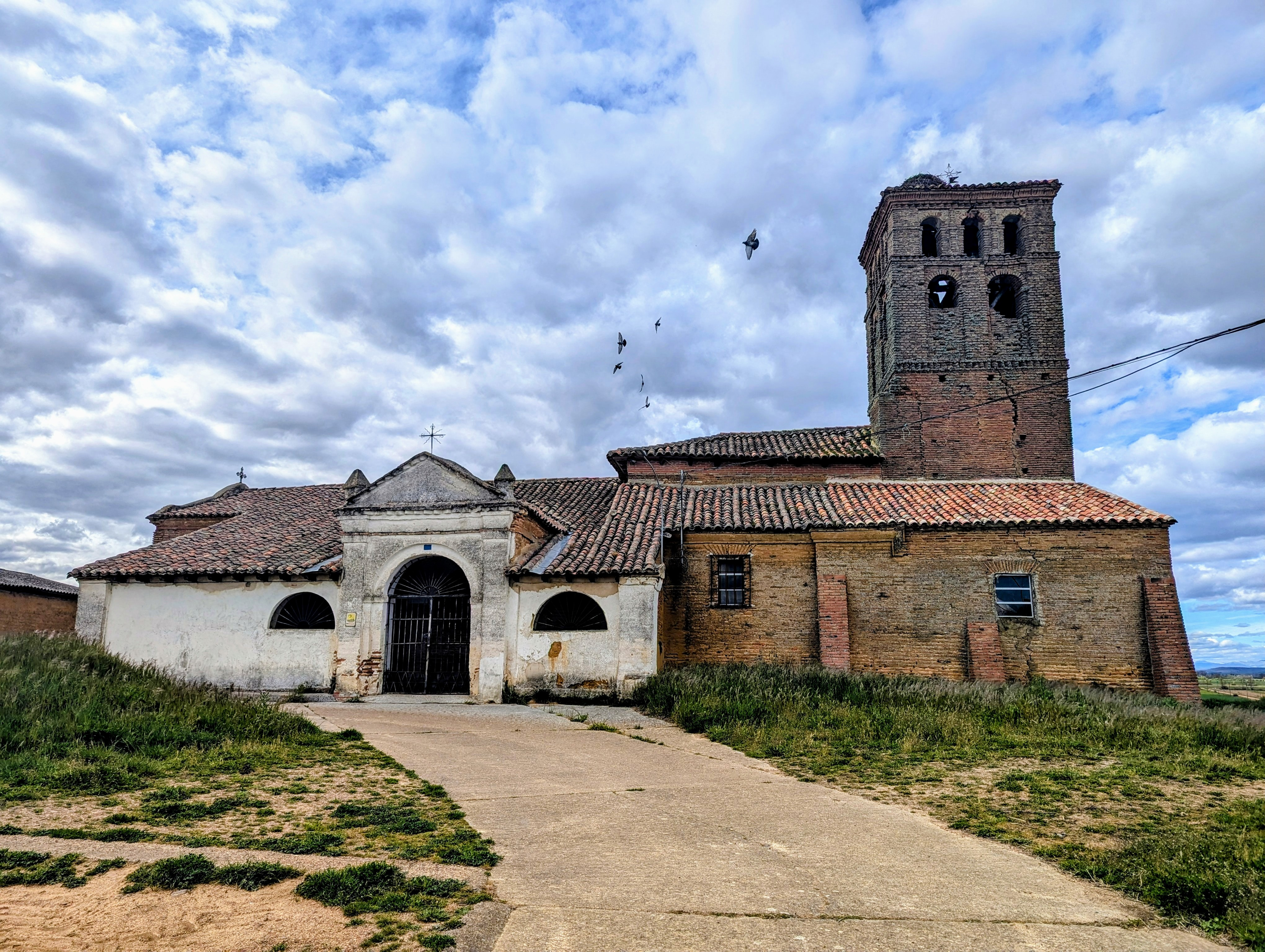
- Church of San Pelayo
- Interactive map of Codornillos
- Country: Spain
- Province: León
- Municipality: Calzada del Coto
- Comarca: Tierra de Sahagún

Population (2025)
  - Total: 35
- Website: Codornillos (Calzada del Coto)

Codornillos (Spanish pronunciation: [kˌoðoɾnˈiʎos]) is a locality belonging to the municipality of Calzada del Coto, in the southeast of the province of León, autonomous community of Castile and León, Spain. It belongs to the comarca of Tierra de Sahagún and to the judicial district of Sahagún. According to the 2024 census (INE), Codornillos has a population of 39 inhabitants.

The toponym refers to the Latin term cornutus (from cornu, “horn”), used in medieval place names to describe a prominent or rugged elevation. This interpretation corresponds with the geographical situation of the settlement, which stands on the top of a hill rising above the valley of the Cea River. Medieval documents record several earlier forms of the name, including “Cornutellos”, “Cornudellos”, “Cornodiellos”, and “Codorniellos”, which gradually evolved into the present form Codornillos.
