= Bercianos del Real Camino =

Bercianos del Real Camino Bercianos del Reyal Camín
- municipality
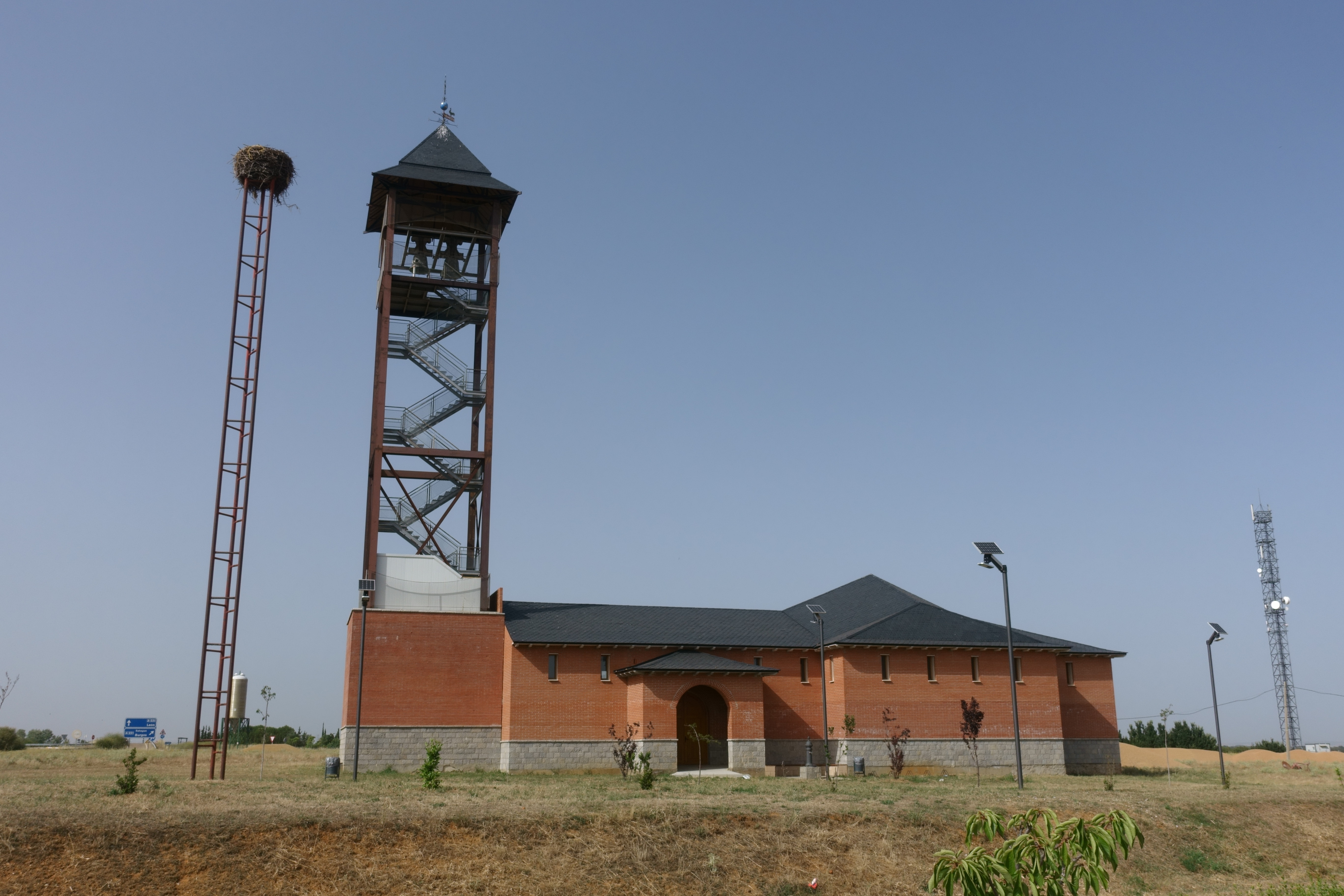
- Salvador Church in Bercianos del Real Camino

- Flag Coat of arms

- Location within Spain
- Coordinates: 42°23′15″N 5°8′39″W
- Country: Spain
- Autonomous community: Castile and León
- Province: León
- Municipality: Bercianos del Real Camino

Government
  - Mayor: Víctor Fidel Rueda García (PP)

Area
  - Total: 34.24 km^{2} (13.22 sq mi)
- Elevation: 854 m (2,802 ft)

Population (2025-01-01)
  - Total: 179
  - Density: 5.23/km^{2} (13.5/sq mi)
- Time zone: UTC+1 (CET)
  - Summer (DST): UTC+2 (CEST)
- Postal Code: 24325
- Telephone prefix: 987
- Climate: Cfb
- Website: Bercianos del Real Camino

Bercianos del Real Camino (Spanish pronunciation: [beɾˈθjanos ðel reˈal kaˈmino], Leonese: Bercianos del Reyal Camín) is a municipality located in the province of León, Castile and León, Spain. According to the 2004 census (INE), the municipality has a population of 205.
