= El Burgo Ranero =

- Municipality
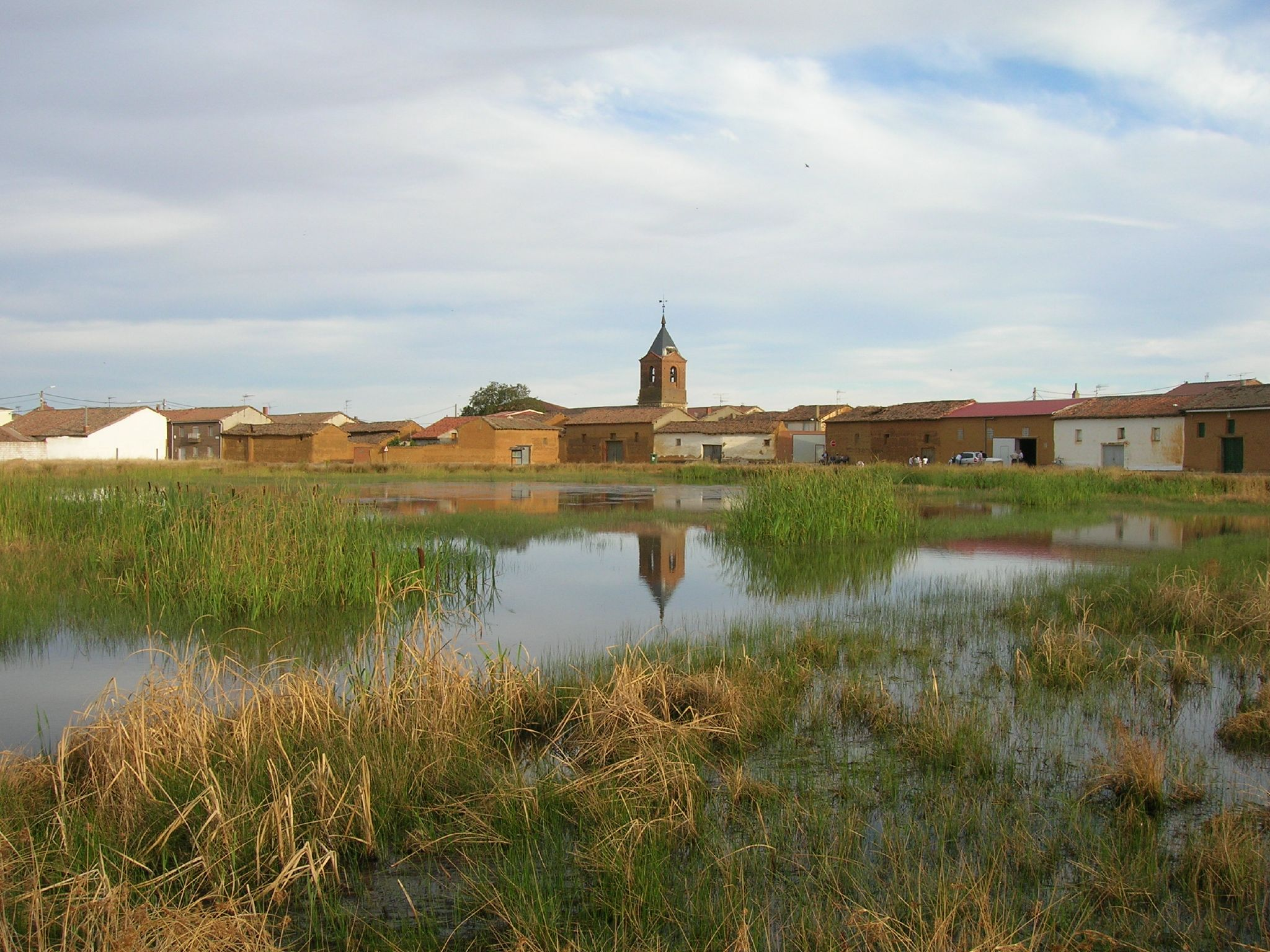
- El Burgo Ranero from the lake

- Flag Coat of arms

- Location within Spain
- Coordinates: 42°25′22″N 5°13′17″W
- Country: Spain
- Autonomous community: Castile and León
- Province: León
- Municipality: El Burgo Ranero

Government
  - Mayor: Gerásimo Vallejo Herreros (PSOE)

Area
  - Total: 98.34 km^{2} (37.97 sq mi)
- Elevation: 879 m (2,884 ft)

Population (2025-01-01)
  - Total: 697
  - Density: 7.09/km^{2} (18.4/sq mi)
- Time zone: UTC+1 (CET)
  - Summer (DST): UTC+2 (CEST)
- Postal Code: 24343
- Telephone prefix: 987
- Website: El Burgo Ranero

El Burgo Ranero (Spanish pronunciation: [el ˈβuɾɣo raˈneɾo]) is a village and municipality in the southeast of the province of León, in the autonomous community of Castile and León, Spain. It belongs to the comarca of Tierra de Sahagún and the judicial district of Sahagún. According to the 2025 census (INE), it has a population of 697 inhabitants. It covers an area of 98.34 square kilometres (37.97 sq mi).

== Localities of the municipality ==
- Calzadilla de los Hermanillos
- El Burgo Ranero (seat or capital)
- Las Grañeras
- Villamuñío
