= Villamol =

Coordinates: 42°26′N 5°03′W

- municipality
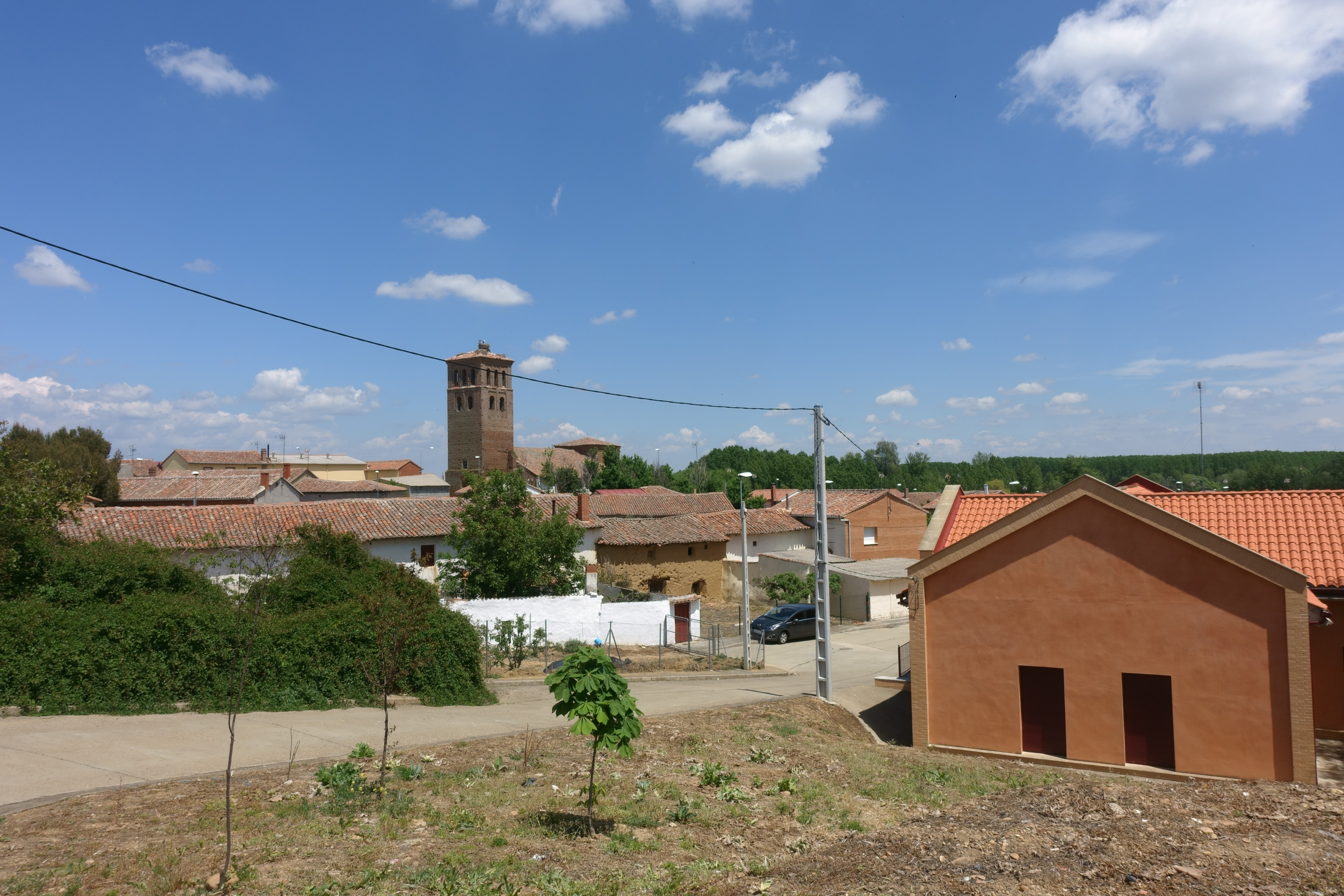
- Street of Villamol
- Interactive map of Villamol
- Country: Spain
- Autonomous community: Castile and León
- Province: León
- Municipality: Villamol

Area
  - Total: 39.63 km^{2} (15.30 sq mi)
- Elevation: 820 m (2,690 ft)

Population (2025-01-01)
  - Total: 134
  - Density: 3.38/km^{2} (8.76/sq mi)
- Time zone: UTC+1 (CET)
  - Summer (DST): UTC+2 (CEST)

Villamol is a municipality located in the province of León, Castile and León, Spain. According to the 2004 census (INE), the municipality had a population of 222 inhabitants.
