= Gordaliza del Pino =

Gordaliza del Pino Gordaliza del Pinu
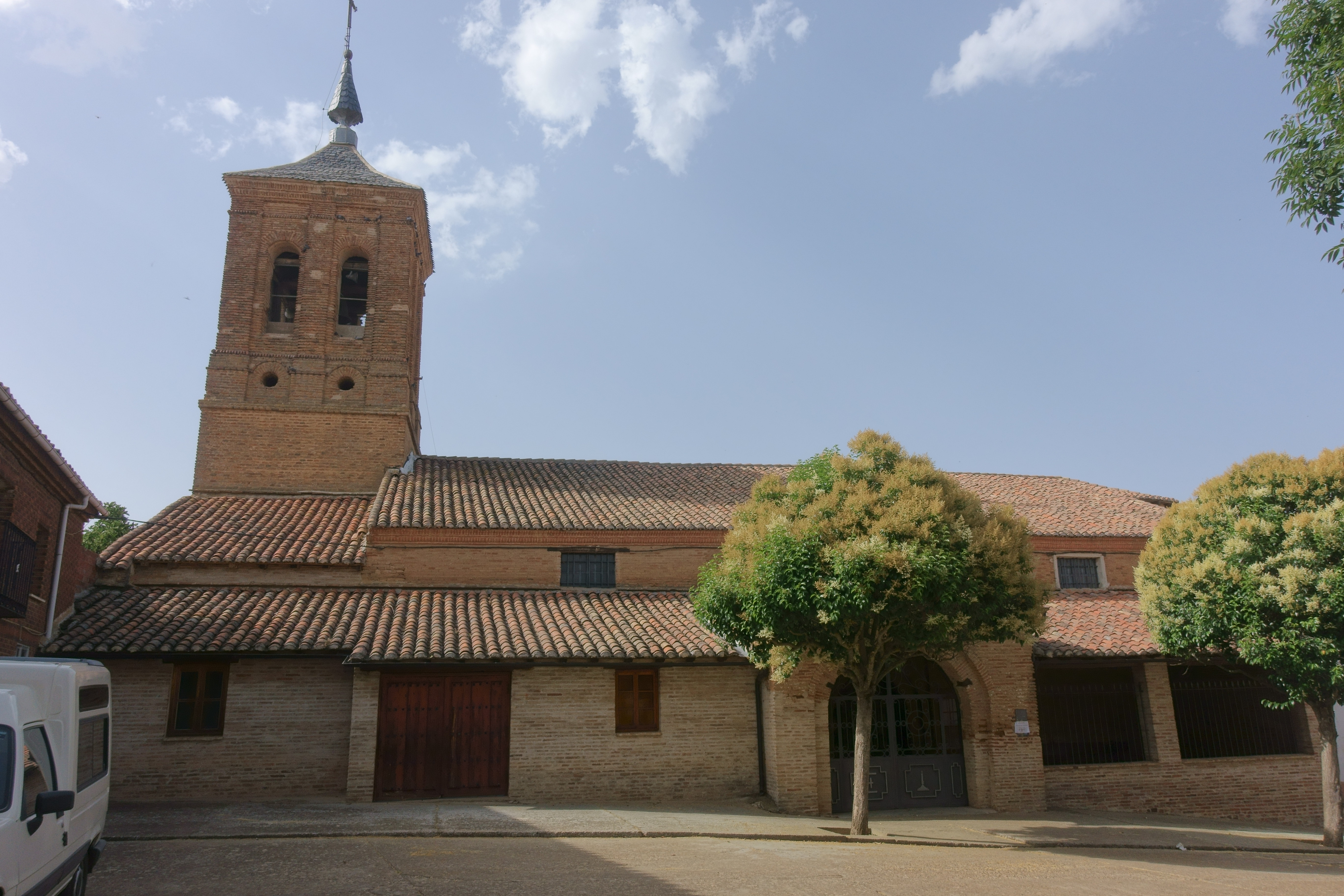
- Gordaliza del Pino Village

- Flag Coat of arms

- Location within Spain
- Coordinates: 42°20′37″N 5°9′26″W
- Country: Spain
- Autonomous community: Castile and León
- Province: León
- Municipality: Gordaliza del Pino

Government
  - Mayor: Víctor Miguélez Fernández (PP)

Area
  - Total: 27.32 km^{2} (10.55 sq mi)
- Elevation: 823 m (2,700 ft)

Population (2025-01-01)
  - Total: 238
  - Density: 8.71/km^{2} (22.6/sq mi)
- Demonym: gordalicense
- Time zone: UTC+1 (CET)
  - Summer (DST): UTC+2 (CEST)
- Postal Code: 24325
- Telephone prefix: 987
- Climate: Cfb
- Website: Ayto. de Gordaliza del Pino

Gordaliza del Pino (Spanish pronunciation: [ɡoɾðaˈliθa ðel ˈpino]), Gordaliza del Pinu in Leonese language, is a small town located in the province of León, Castile and León, Spain. According to the 2010 census (INE), the municipality has a population of 304 inhabitants.
